= List of municipalities in Santa Catarina =

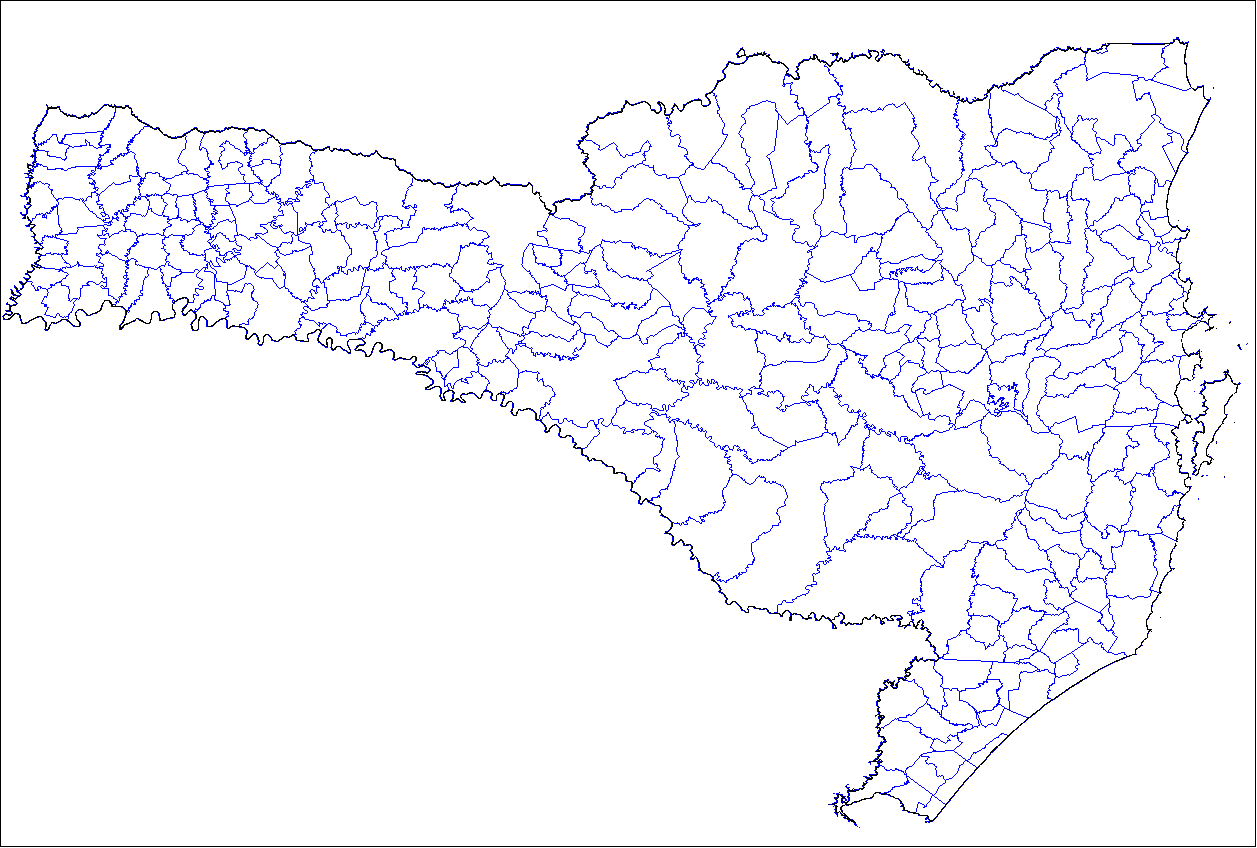
Municipalities of Santa Catarina, Brazil

This is a list of the municipalities in the state of Santa Catarina (SC), located in the South Region of Brazil. Santa Catarina is divided into 295 municipalities, which are grouped into 24 immediate geographic regions, which are grouped into 7 intermediate geographic regions.

== Former Mesoregions and Microregions ==
Mesoregion	Microregion	Municipality	Population (2022)	Area (km²)
Grande Florianópolis	Florianópolis	Antônio Carlos	11,224	234
Grande Florianópolis	Florianópolis	Biguaçu	76,773	365
Grande Florianópolis	Florianópolis	Florianópolis (State Capital)	537,211	674
Grande Florianópolis	Florianópolis	Governador Celso Ramos	16,915	127
Grande Florianópolis	Florianópolis	Palhoça	222,598	394
Grande Florianópolis	Florianópolis	Paulo Lopes	9,063	446
Grande Florianópolis	Florianópolis	Santo Amaro da Imperatriz	27,272	344
Grande Florianópolis	Florianópolis	São José	270,299	150
Grande Florianópolis	Florianópolis	São Pedro de Alcântara	5,776	139
Grande Florianópolis	Tabuleiro	Águas Mornas	6,743	326
Grande Florianópolis	Tabuleiro	Alfredo Wagner	10,481	733
Grande Florianópolis	Tabuleiro	Anitápolis	3,593	540
Grande Florianópolis	Tabuleiro	Rancho Queimado	3,279	286
Grande Florianópolis	Tabuleiro	São Bonifácio	2,946	461
Grande Florianópolis	Tijucas	Angelina	5,358	499
Grande Florianópolis	Tijucas	Canelinha	12,821	150
Grande Florianópolis	Tijucas	Leoberto Leal	3,330	293
Grande Florianópolis	Tijucas	Major Gercino	3,214	306
Grande Florianópolis	Tijucas	Nova Trento	13,727	402
Grande Florianópolis	Tijucas	São João Batista	32,687	200
Grande Florianópolis	Tijucas	Tijucas	51,592	279
Norte Catarinense	Canoinhas	Bela Vista do Toldo		
Norte Catarinense	Canoinhas	Canoinhas		
Norte Catarinense	Canoinhas	Irineópolis		
Norte Catarinense	Canoinhas	Itaiópolis		
Norte Catarinense	Canoinhas	Mafra		
Norte Catarinense	Canoinhas	Major Vieira		
Norte Catarinense	Canoinhas	Monte Castelo		
Norte Catarinense	Canoinhas	Papanduva		
Norte Catarinense	Canoinhas	Porto União		
Norte Catarinense	Canoinhas	Santa Terezinha		
Norte Catarinense	Canoinhas	Timbó Grande		
Norte Catarinense	Canoinhas	Três Barras		
Norte Catarinense	Joinville	Araquari	45,283	386
Norte Catarinense	Joinville	Balneário Barra do Sul	14,912	108
Norte Catarinense	Joinville	Corupá	15,267	405
Norte Catarinense	Joinville	Garuva	18,545	503
Norte Catarinense	Joinville	Guaramirim	46,711	267
Norte Catarinense	Joinville	Itapoá	30,750	245
Norte Catarinense	Joinville	Jaraguá do Sul	182,660	530
Norte Catarinense	Joinville	Joinville	616,317	1127
Norte Catarinense	Joinville	Massaranduba	17,162	374
Norte Catarinense	Joinville	São Francisco do Sul	52,674	493
Norte Catarinense	Joinville	Schroeder	20,061	165
Norte Catarinense	São Bento do Sul	Campo Alegre	12,501	500
Norte Catarinense	São Bento do Sul	Rio Negrinho	39,261	907
Norte Catarinense	São Bento do Sul	São Bento do Sul	83,277	495
Oeste Catarinense	Chapecó	Águas de Chapecó		
Oeste Catarinense	Chapecó	Águas Frias		
Oeste Catarinense	Chapecó	Bom Jesus do Oeste		
Oeste Catarinense	Chapecó	Caibi		
Oeste Catarinense	Chapecó	Campo Erê		
Oeste Catarinense	Chapecó	Caxambu do Sul		
Oeste Catarinense	Chapecó	Chapecó		
Oeste Catarinense	Chapecó	Cordilheira Alta		
Oeste Catarinense	Chapecó	Coronel Freitas		
Oeste Catarinense	Chapecó	Cunha Porã		
Oeste Catarinense	Chapecó	Cunhataí		
Oeste Catarinense	Chapecó	Flor do Sertão		
Oeste Catarinense	Chapecó	Formosa do Sul		
Oeste Catarinense	Chapecó	Guatambu		
Oeste Catarinense	Chapecó	Iraceminha		
Oeste Catarinense	Chapecó	Irati		
Oeste Catarinense	Chapecó	Jardinópolis		
Oeste Catarinense	Chapecó	Maravilha		
Oeste Catarinense	Chapecó	Modelo		
Oeste Catarinense	Chapecó	Nova Erechim		
Oeste Catarinense	Chapecó	Nova Itaberaba		
Oeste Catarinense	Chapecó	Novo Horizonte		
Oeste Catarinense	Chapecó	Palmitos		
Oeste Catarinense	Chapecó	Pinhalzinho		
Oeste Catarinense	Chapecó	Planalto Alegre		
Oeste Catarinense	Chapecó	Quilombo		
Oeste Catarinense	Chapecó	Saltinho		
Oeste Catarinense	Chapecó	Santa Terezinha do Progresso		
Oeste Catarinense	Chapecó	Santiago do Sul		
Oeste Catarinense	Chapecó	São Bernardino		
Oeste Catarinense	Chapecó	São Carlos		
Oeste Catarinense	Chapecó	São Lourenço do Oeste		
Oeste Catarinense	Chapecó	São Miguel da Boa Vista		
Oeste Catarinense	Chapecó	Saudades		
Oeste Catarinense	Chapecó	Serra Alta		
Oeste Catarinense	Chapecó	Sul Brasil		
Oeste Catarinense	Chapecó	Tigrinhos		
Oeste Catarinense	Chapecó	União do Oeste		
Oeste Catarinense	Concórdia	Alto Bela Vista		
Oeste Catarinense	Concórdia	Arabutã		
Oeste Catarinense	Concórdia	Arvoredo		
Oeste Catarinense	Concórdia	Concórdia		
Oeste Catarinense	Concórdia	Ipira		
Oeste Catarinense	Concórdia	Ipumirim		
Oeste Catarinense	Concórdia	Irani		
Oeste Catarinense	Concórdia	Itá		
Oeste Catarinense	Concórdia	Lindóia do Sul		
Oeste Catarinense	Concórdia	Paial		
Oeste Catarinense	Concórdia	Peritiba		
Oeste Catarinense	Concórdia	Piratuba		
Oeste Catarinense	Concórdia	Presidente Castelo Branco		
Oeste Catarinense	Concórdia	Seara		
Oeste Catarinense	Concórdia	Xavantina		
Oeste Catarinense	Joaçaba	Água Doce		
Oeste Catarinense	Joaçaba	Arroio Trinta		
Oeste Catarinense	Joaçaba	Caçador		
Oeste Catarinense	Joaçaba	Calmon		
Oeste Catarinense	Joaçaba	Capinzal		
Oeste Catarinense	Joaçaba	Catanduvas		
Oeste Catarinense	Joaçaba	Erval Velho		
Oeste Catarinense	Joaçaba	Fraiburgo		
Oeste Catarinense	Joaçaba	Herval d'Oeste		
Oeste Catarinense	Joaçaba	Ibiam		
Oeste Catarinense	Joaçaba	Ibicaré		
Oeste Catarinense	Joaçaba	Iomerê		
Oeste Catarinense	Joaçaba	Jaborá		
Oeste Catarinense	Joaçaba	Joaçaba		
Oeste Catarinense	Joaçaba	Lacerdópolis		
Oeste Catarinense	Joaçaba	Lebon Régis		
Oeste Catarinense	Joaçaba	Luzerna		
Oeste Catarinense	Joaçaba	Macieira		
Oeste Catarinense	Joaçaba	Matos Costa		
Oeste Catarinense	Joaçaba	Ouro		
Oeste Catarinense	Joaçaba	Pinheiro Preto		
Oeste Catarinense	Joaçaba	Rio das Antas		
Oeste Catarinense	Joaçaba	Salto Veloso		
Oeste Catarinense	Joaçaba	Tangará		
Oeste Catarinense	Joaçaba	Treze Tílias		
Oeste Catarinense	Joaçaba	Vargem Bonita		
Oeste Catarinense	Joaçaba	Videira		
Oeste Catarinense	São Miguel d'Oeste	Anchieta		
Oeste Catarinense	São Miguel d'Oeste	Bandeirante		
Oeste Catarinense	São Miguel d'Oeste	Barra Bonita		
Oeste Catarinense	São Miguel d'Oeste	Belmonte		
Oeste Catarinense	São Miguel d'Oeste	Descanso		
Oeste Catarinense	São Miguel d'Oeste	Dionísio Cerqueira		
Oeste Catarinense	São Miguel d'Oeste	Guaraciaba		
Oeste Catarinense	São Miguel d'Oeste	Guarujá do Sul		
Oeste Catarinense	São Miguel d'Oeste	Iporã do Oeste		
Oeste Catarinense	São Miguel d'Oeste	Itapiranga		
Oeste Catarinense	São Miguel d'Oeste	Mondaí		
Oeste Catarinense	São Miguel d'Oeste	Palma Sola		
Oeste Catarinense	São Miguel d'Oeste	Paraíso		
Oeste Catarinense	São Miguel d'Oeste	Princesa		
Oeste Catarinense	São Miguel d'Oeste	Riqueza		
Oeste Catarinense	São Miguel d'Oeste	Romelândia		
Oeste Catarinense	São Miguel d'Oeste	Santa Helena		
Oeste Catarinense	São Miguel d'Oeste	São João do Oeste		
Oeste Catarinense	São Miguel d'Oeste	São José do Cedro		
Oeste Catarinense	São Miguel d'Oeste	São Miguel do Oeste		
Oeste Catarinense	São Miguel d'Oeste	Tunápolis		
Oeste Catarinense	Xanxerê	Abelardo Luz		
Oeste Catarinense	Xanxerê	Bom Jesus		
Oeste Catarinense	Xanxerê	Coronel Martins		
Oeste Catarinense	Xanxerê	Entre Rios		
Oeste Catarinense	Xanxerê	Faxinal dos Guedes		
Oeste Catarinense	Xanxerê	Galvão		
Oeste Catarinense	Xanxerê	Ipuaçu		
Oeste Catarinense	Xanxerê	Jupiá		
Oeste Catarinense	Xanxerê	Lajeado Grande		
Oeste Catarinense	Xanxerê	Marema		
Oeste Catarinense	Xanxerê	Ouro Verde		
Oeste Catarinense	Xanxerê	Passos Maia		
Oeste Catarinense	Xanxerê	Ponte Serrada		
Oeste Catarinense	Xanxerê	São Domingos		
Oeste Catarinense	Xanxerê	Vargeão		
Oeste Catarinense	Xanxerê	Xanxerê		
Oeste Catarinense	Xanxerê	Xaxim		
Serrana	Campos de Lages	Anita Garibaldi		
Serrana	Campos de Lages	Bocaina do Sul		
Serrana	Campos de Lages	Bom Jardim da Serra		
Serrana	Campos de Lages	Bom Retiro		
Serrana	Campos de Lages	Campo Belo do Sul		
Serrana	Campos de Lages	Capão Alto		
Serrana	Campos de Lages	Celso Ramos		
Serrana	Campos de Lages	Cerro Negro		
Serrana	Campos de Lages	Correia Pinto		
Serrana	Campos de Lages	Lages		
Serrana	Campos de Lages	Otacílio Costa		
Serrana	Campos de Lages	Painel		
Serrana	Campos de Lages	Palmeira		
Serrana	Campos de Lages	Rio Rufino		
Serrana	Campos de Lages	São Joaquim		
Serrana	Campos de Lages	São José do Cerrito		
Serrana	Campos de Lages	Urubici		
Serrana	Campos de Lages	Urupema		
Serrana	Curitibanos	Abdon Batista		
Serrana	Curitibanos	Brunópolis		
Serrana	Curitibanos	Campos Novos		
Serrana	Curitibanos	Curitibanos		
Serrana	Curitibanos	Frei Rogério		
Serrana	Curitibanos	Monte Carlo		
Serrana	Curitibanos	Ponte Alta		
Serrana	Curitibanos	Ponte Alta do Norte		
Serrana	Curitibanos	Santa Cecília		
Serrana	Curitibanos	São Cristóvão do Sul		
Serrana	Curitibanos	Vargem		
Serrana	Curitibanos	Zortéa		
Sul Catarinense	Araranguá	Araranguá		
Sul Catarinense	Araranguá	Balneário Arroio do Silva		
Sul Catarinense	Araranguá	Balneário Gaivota		
Sul Catarinense	Araranguá	Ermo		
Sul Catarinense	Araranguá	Jacinto Machado		
Sul Catarinense	Araranguá	Maracajá		
Sul Catarinense	Araranguá	Meleiro		
Sul Catarinense	Araranguá	Morro Grande		
Sul Catarinense	Araranguá	Passo de Torres		
Sul Catarinense	Araranguá	Praia Grande		
Sul Catarinense	Araranguá	Santa Rosa do Sul		
Sul Catarinense	Araranguá	São João do Sul		
Sul Catarinense	Araranguá	Sombrio		
Sul Catarinense	Araranguá	Timbé do Sul		
Sul Catarinense	Araranguá	Turvo		
Sul Catarinense	Criciúma	Balneário Rincão		
Sul Catarinense	Criciúma	Cocal do Sul		
Sul Catarinense	Criciúma	Criciúma		
Sul Catarinense	Criciúma	Forquilhinha		
Sul Catarinense	Criciúma	Içara		
Sul Catarinense	Criciúma	Lauro Müller		
Sul Catarinense	Criciúma	Morro da Fumaça		
Sul Catarinense	Criciúma	Nova Veneza		
Sul Catarinense	Criciúma	Siderópolis		
Sul Catarinense	Criciúma	Treviso		
Sul Catarinense	Criciúma	Urussanga		
Sul Catarinense	Tubarão	Armazém		
Sul Catarinense	Tubarão	Braço do Norte		
Sul Catarinense	Tubarão	Capivari de Baixo		
Sul Catarinense	Tubarão	Garopaba		
Sul Catarinense	Tubarão	Grão Pará		
Sul Catarinense	Tubarão	Gravatal		
Sul Catarinense	Tubarão	Imaruí		
Sul Catarinense	Tubarão	Imbituba		
Sul Catarinense	Tubarão	Jaguaruna		
Sul Catarinense	Tubarão	Laguna		
Sul Catarinense	Tubarão	Orleans		
Sul Catarinense	Tubarão	Pedras Grandes		
Sul Catarinense	Tubarão	Pescaria Brava		
Sul Catarinense	Tubarão	Rio Fortuna		
Sul Catarinense	Tubarão	Sangão		
Sul Catarinense	Tubarão	Santa Rosa de Lima		
Sul Catarinense	Tubarão	São Ludgero		
Sul Catarinense	Tubarão	São Martinho		
Sul Catarinense	Tubarão	Treze de Maio		
Sul Catarinense	Tubarão	Tubarão		
Vale do Itajaí	Blumenau	Apiúna		
Vale do Itajaí	Blumenau	Ascurra		
Vale do Itajaí	Blumenau	Benedito Novo		
Vale do Itajaí	Blumenau	Blumenau		
Vale do Itajaí	Blumenau	Botuverá		
Vale do Itajaí	Blumenau	Brusque		
Vale do Itajaí	Blumenau	Doutor Pedrinho		
Vale do Itajaí	Blumenau	Gaspar		
Vale do Itajaí	Blumenau	Guabiruba		
Vale do Itajaí	Blumenau	Indaial		
Vale do Itajaí	Blumenau	Luiz Alves		
Vale do Itajaí	Blumenau	Pomerode		
Vale do Itajaí	Blumenau	Rio dos Cedros		
Vale do Itajaí	Blumenau	Rodeio		
Vale do Itajaí	Blumenau	Timbó		
Vale do Itajaí	Itajaí	Balneário Camboriú		
Vale do Itajaí	Itajaí	Balneário Piçarras		
Vale do Itajaí	Itajaí	Barra Velha		
Vale do Itajaí	Itajaí	Bombinhas		
Vale do Itajaí	Itajaí	Camboriú		
Vale do Itajaí	Itajaí	Ilhota		
Vale do Itajaí	Itajaí	Itajaí		
Vale do Itajaí	Itajaí	Itapema		
Vale do Itajaí	Itajaí	Navegantes		
Vale do Itajaí	Itajaí	Penha		
Vale do Itajaí	Itajaí	Porto Belo		
Vale do Itajaí	Itajaí	São João do Itaperiú		
Vale do Itajaí	Ituporanga	Agrolândia		
Vale do Itajaí	Ituporanga	Atalanta		
Vale do Itajaí	Ituporanga	Chapadão do Lageado		
Vale do Itajaí	Ituporanga	Imbuia		
Vale do Itajaí	Ituporanga	Ituporanga		
Vale do Itajaí	Ituporanga	Petrolândia		
Vale do Itajaí	Ituporanga	Vidal Ramos		
Vale do Itajaí	Rio do Sul	Agronômica		
Vale do Itajaí	Rio do Sul	Aurora		
Vale do Itajaí	Rio do Sul	Braço do Trombudo		
Vale do Itajaí	Rio do Sul	Dona Emma		
Vale do Itajaí	Rio do Sul	Ibirama		
Vale do Itajaí	Rio do Sul	José Boiteux		
Vale do Itajaí	Rio do Sul	Laurentino		
Vale do Itajaí	Rio do Sul	Lontras		
Vale do Itajaí	Rio do Sul	Mirim Doce		
Vale do Itajaí	Rio do Sul	Pouso Redondo		
Vale do Itajaí	Rio do Sul	Presidente Getúlio		
Vale do Itajaí	Rio do Sul	Presidente Nereu		
Vale do Itajaí	Rio do Sul	Rio do Campo		
Vale do Itajaí	Rio do Sul	Rio do Oeste		
Vale do Itajaí	Rio do Sul	Rio do Sul		
Vale do Itajaí	Rio do Sul	Salete		
Vale do Itajaí	Rio do Sul	Taió		
Vale do Itajaí	Rio do Sul	Trombudo Central		
Vale do Itajaí	Rio do Sul	Vitor Meireles		
Vale do Itajaí	Rio do Sul	Witmarsum		

== See also ==
- Geography of Brazil
