= Saltinho =

Saltinho may refer to the following places in Brazil:

- Saltinho, São Paulo
- Saltinho, Santa Catarina
