= Ermo, Santa Catarina =

Coordinates: 6°31′S 38°37′W

- Municipality
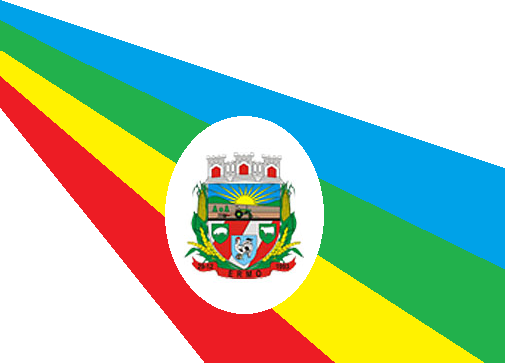
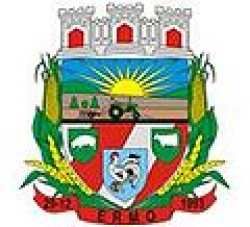
- Flag Coat of arms
- Interactive map of Ermo, Santa Catarina
- Country: Brazil
- Region: South
- State: Santa Catarina
- Mesoregion: Sul Catarinense

Population (2020)
  - Total: 2,061
- Time zone: UTC -3

Ermo, Santa Catarina is a municipality in the state of Santa Catarina in the South region of Brazil.

== See also ==
- List of municipalities in Santa Catarina
