= Bandeirante, Santa Catarina =

Bandeirante
- Municipality
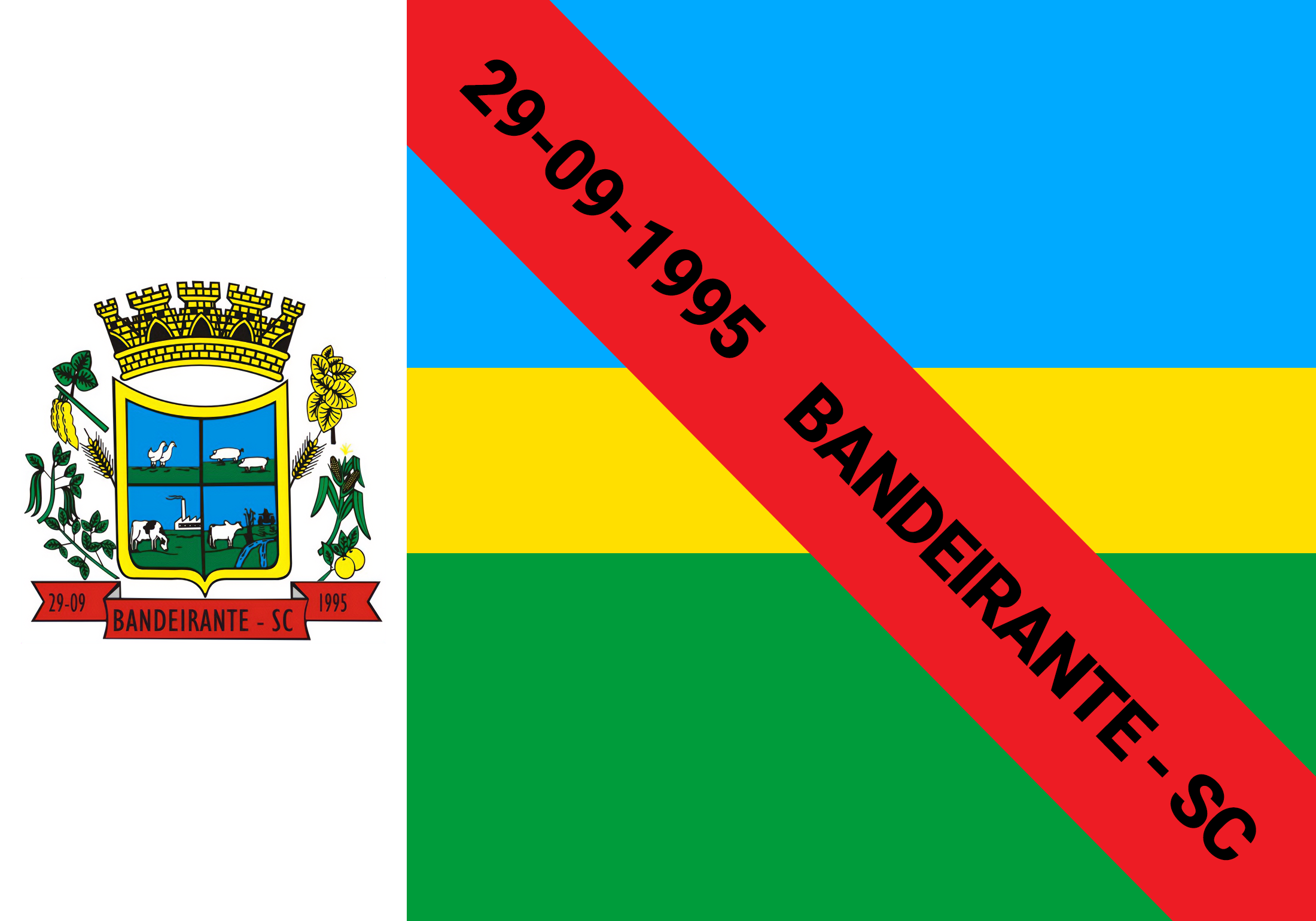
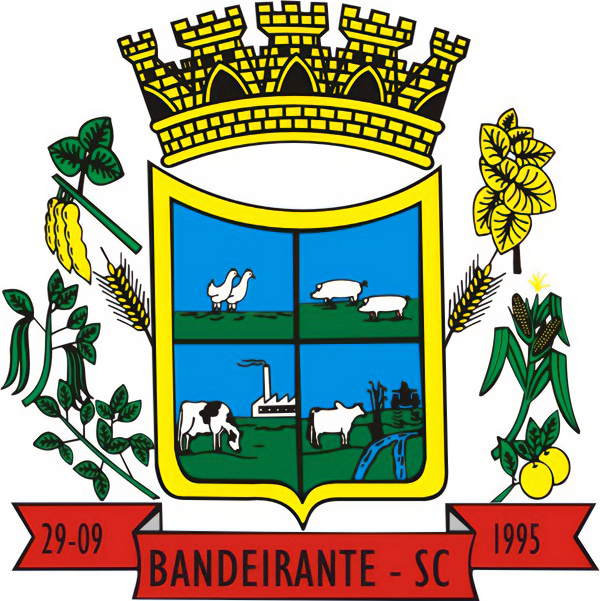
- Flag Coat of arms

- Location in Brazil
- Coordinates: 26°48′8″S 53°38′16″W
- Country: Brazil
- Region: South
- State: Santa Catarina
- Mesoregion: Oeste Catarinense

Population (2020)
  - Total: 2,648
- Time zone: UTC -3
- Website: www.bandeirante.sc.gov.br

Bandeirante is a municipality in the state of Santa Catarina in the South region of Brazil.

== See also ==
- List of municipalities in Santa Catarina
