= Vargem Bonita, Santa Catarina =

Vargem Bonita
- Municipality
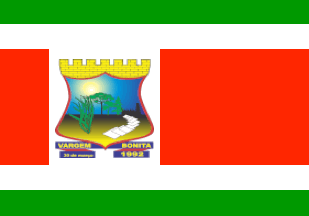
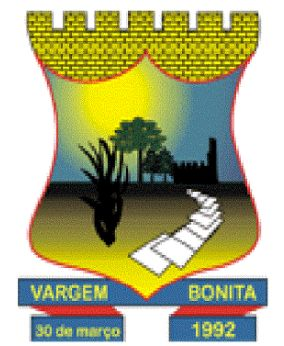
- Flag Coat of arms

- Location in Santa Catarina state

- Location in Brazil
- Coordinates: 27°0′25″S 51°44′24″W
- Country: Brazil
- Region: South
- State: Santa Catarina

Population (2020)
  - Total: 4,451
- Time zone: UTC-03:00 (BRT)
  - Summer (DST): UTC-02:00 (BRST)

Vargem Bonita is a municipality in the state of Santa Catarina in the South region of Brazil.

== See also ==
- List of municipalities in Santa Catarina
