= Romelândia =

Coordinates: 26°38′S 53°19′W

- Municipality
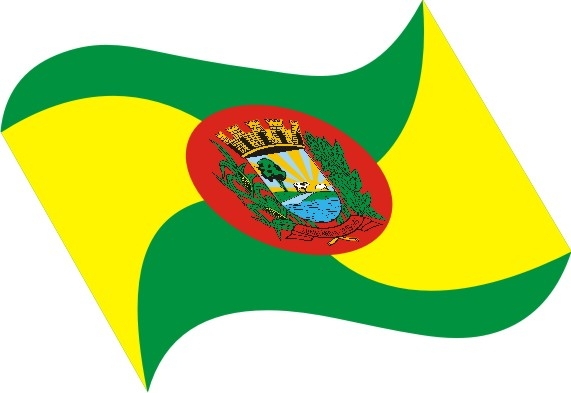
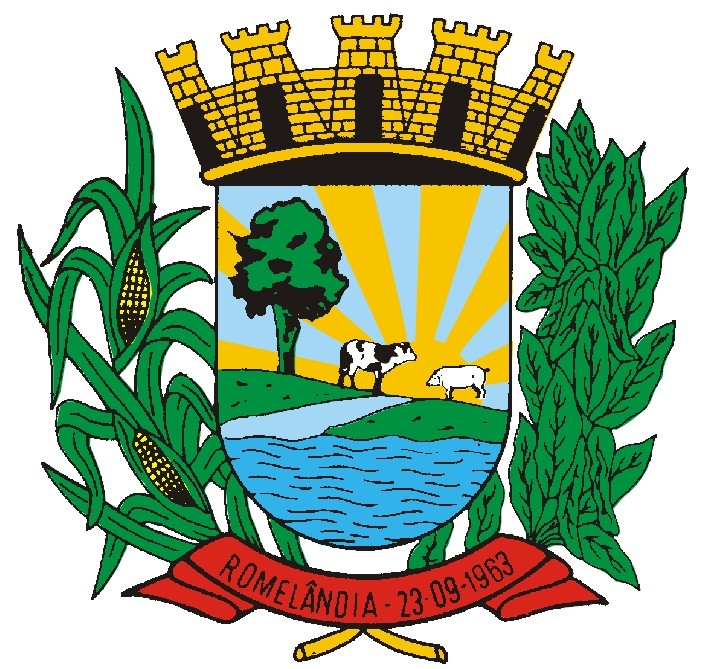
- Flag Coat of arms
- Interactive map of Romelândia
- Country: Brazil
- Region: South
- State: Santa Catarina
- Mesoregion: Oeste Catarinense

Population (2020)
  - Total: 4,684
- Time zone: UTC -3

Romelândia is a municipality in the state of Santa Catarina in the South Region of Brazil.

== See also ==
- List of municipalities in Santa Catarina
