= Palma Sola, Santa Catarina =

Coordinates: 26.3475°S 53.2783°W

- Municipality
- Flag Coat of arms
- Interactive map of Palma Sola, Santa Catarina
- Country: Brazil
- Region: South
- State: Santa Catarina
- Mesoregion: Oeste Catarinense

Population (2020)
  - Total: 7,372
- Time zone: UTC -3
- Website: www.palmasola.sc.gov.br

Palma Sola, Santa Catarina is a municipality in the state of Santa Catarina in the South region of Brazil.

== See also ==
- List of municipalities in Santa Catarina
