= Marema =

- Municipality
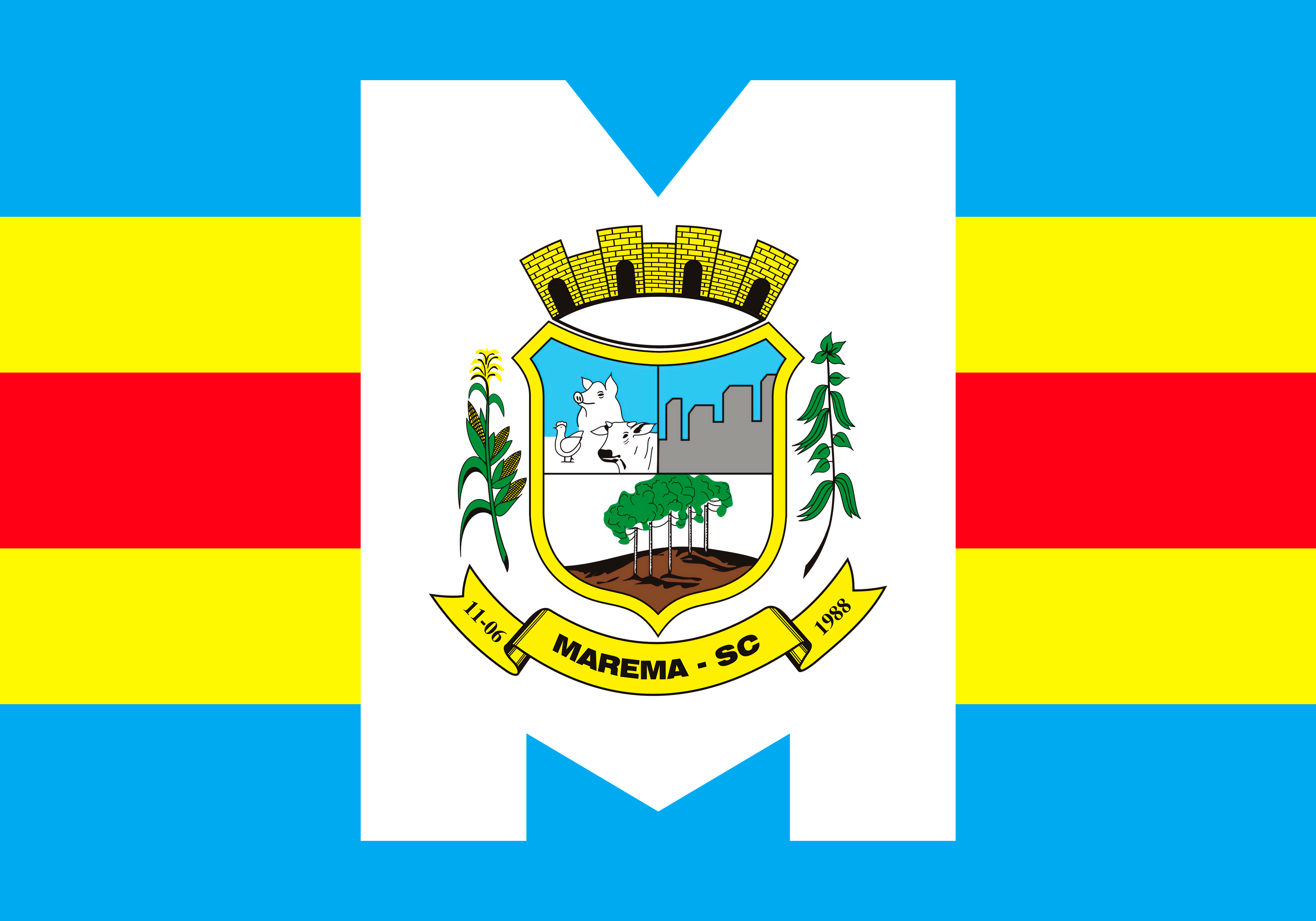
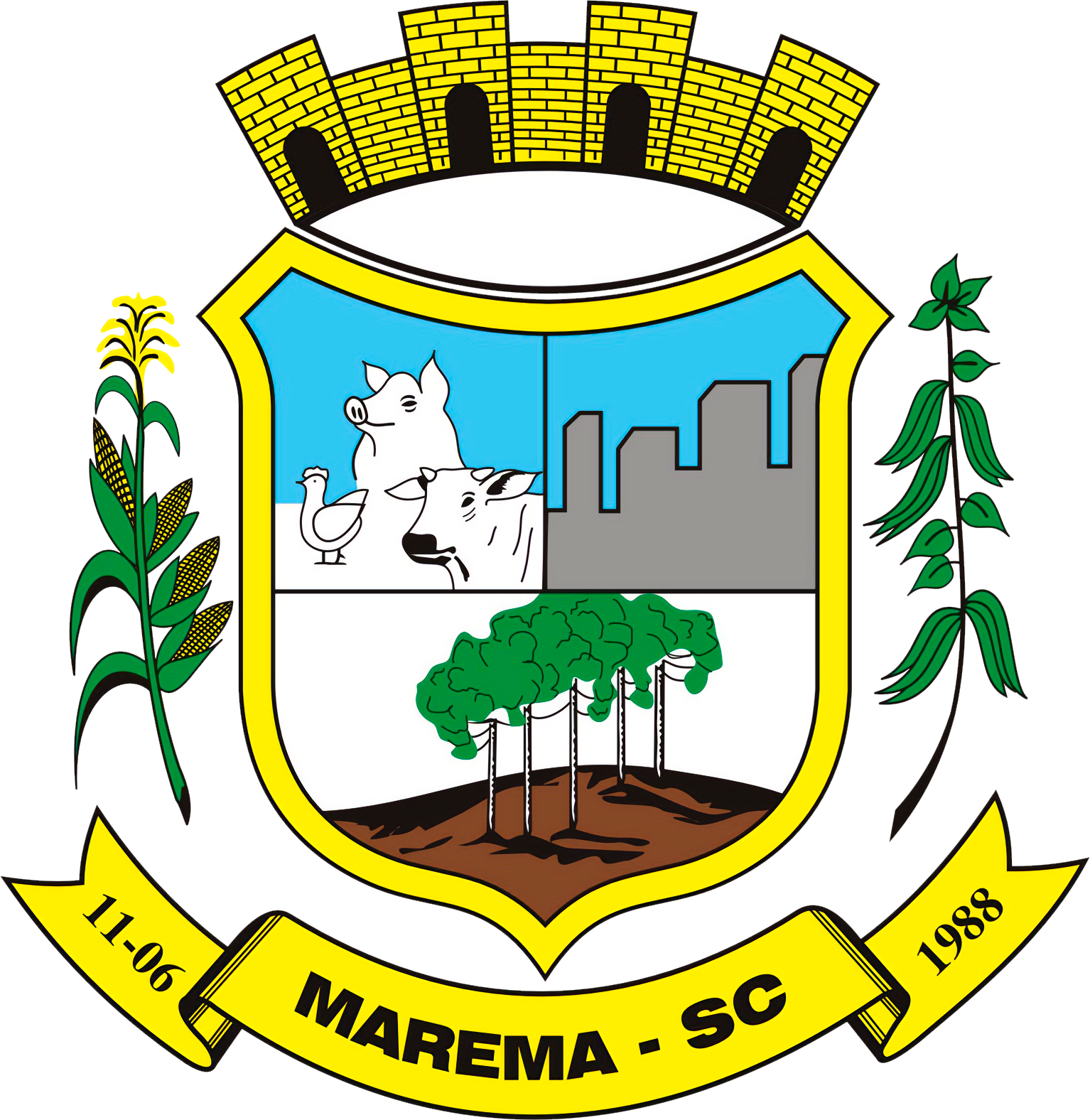
- Flag Coat of arms

- Location of Marema

- Location within Brazil
- Coordinates: 26°48′07″S 52°37′30″W
- Region: South
- State: Santa Catarina
- Mesoregion: Oeste Catarinense
- Founded: June 1, 1989

Area
  - Total: 103.62 km^{2} (40.01 sq mi)
- Elevation: 417 m (1,368 ft)

Population (2020)
  - Total: 1,750
  - Density: 21.54/km^{2} (55.8/sq mi)
- Time zone: UTC-3 (UTC-3)
  - Summer (DST): UTC-2 (UTC-2)
- HDI (2000): 0.795
- Website: www.marema.sc.gov.br

Marema is a Brazilian municipality in the state of Santa Catarina.

== See also ==
- List of municipalities in Santa Catarina
