= Jaborá =

Coordinates: 27°11′S 51°44′W

- Municipality
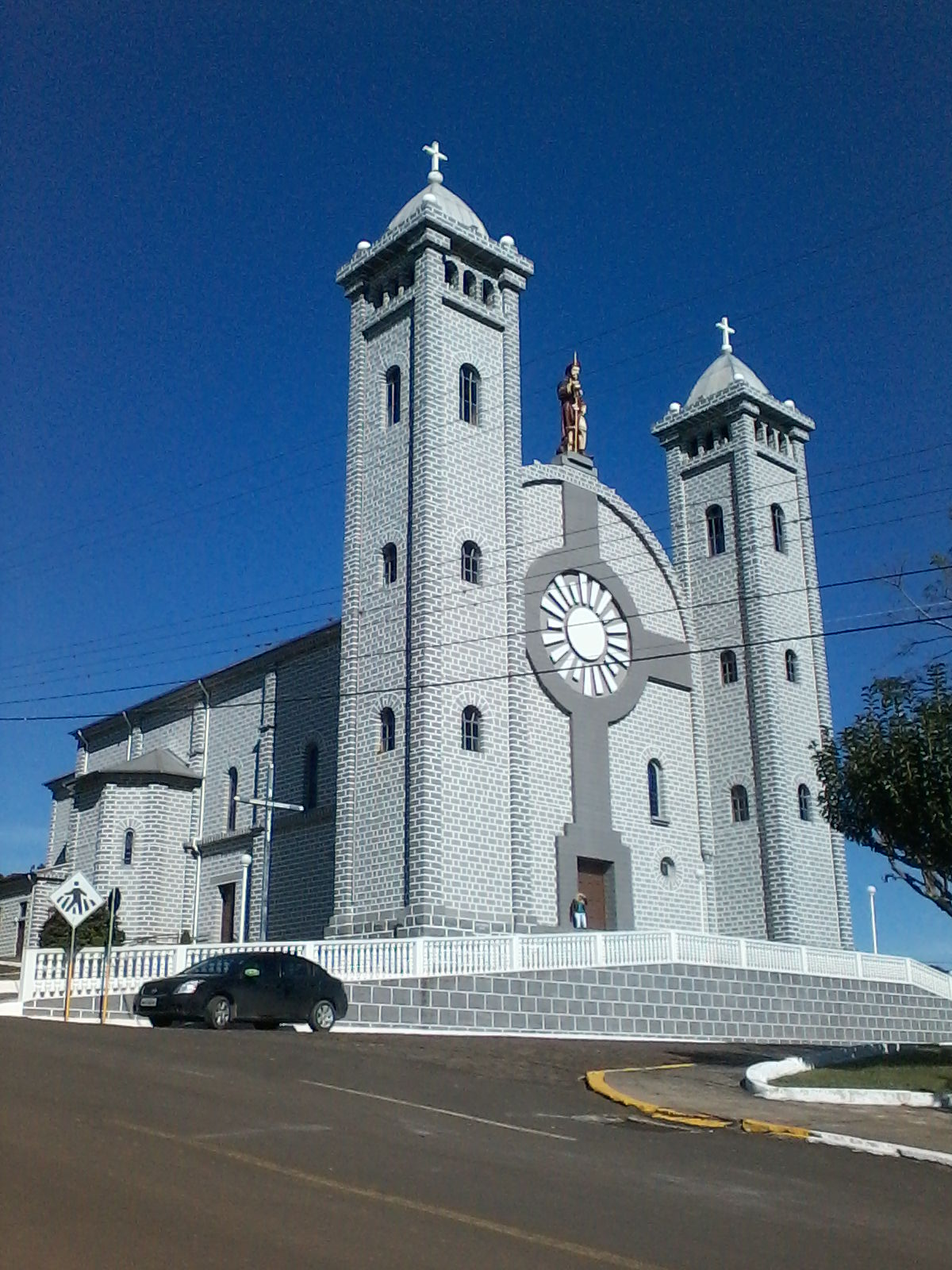

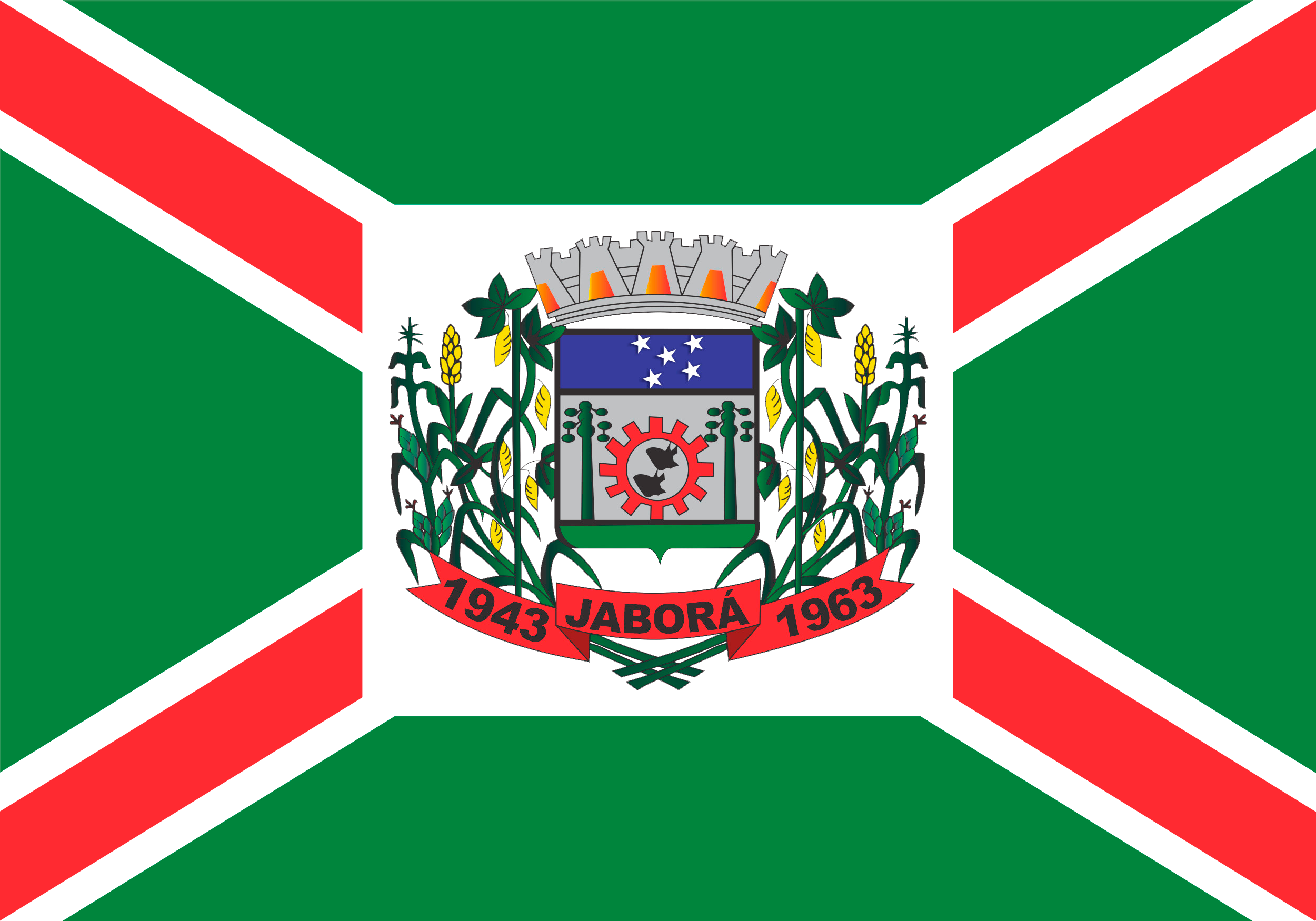
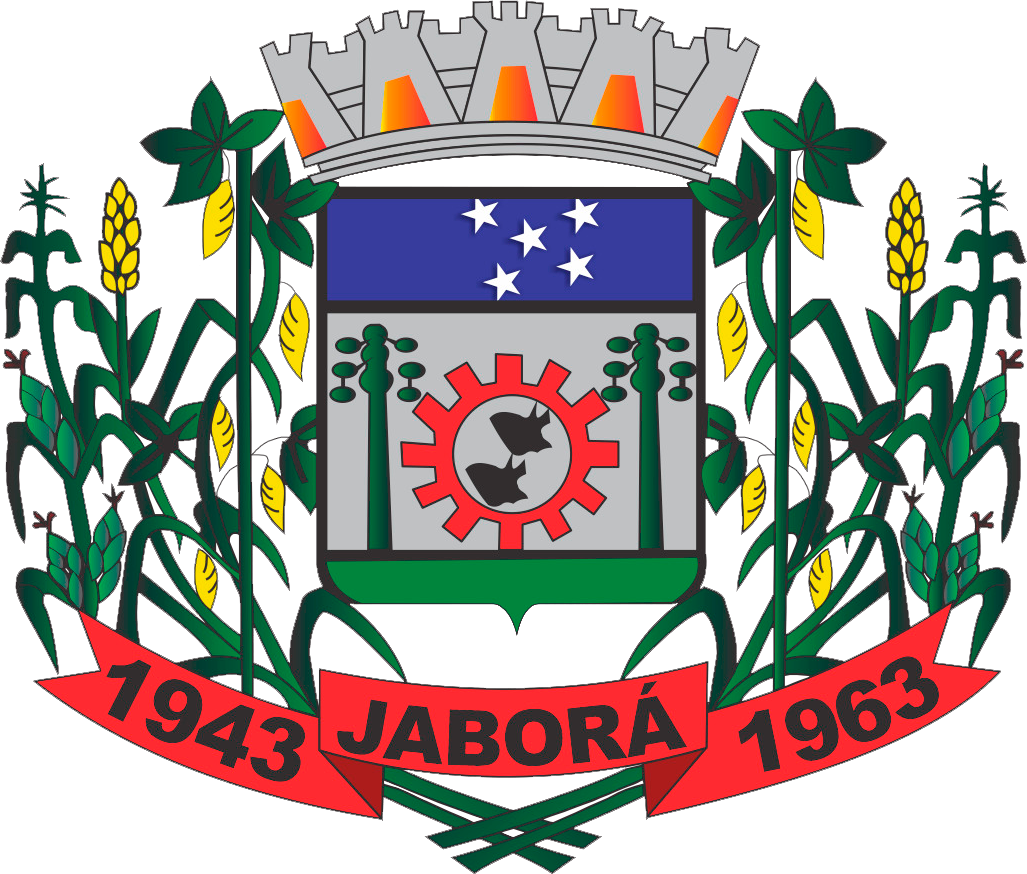
- Flag Coat of arms
- Interactive map of Jaborá
- Country: Brazil
- Region: South
- State: Santa Catarina
- Mesoregion: Oeste Catarinense

Population (2020)
  - Total: 3,918
- Time zone: UTC -3
- Website: www.jabora.sc.gov.br

Jaborá is a municipality in the state of Santa Catarina in the South region of Brazil.

== See also ==
- List of municipalities in Santa Catarina
