= Nova Itaberaba =

Coordinates: 26.9397°S 52.8122°W

- Municipality
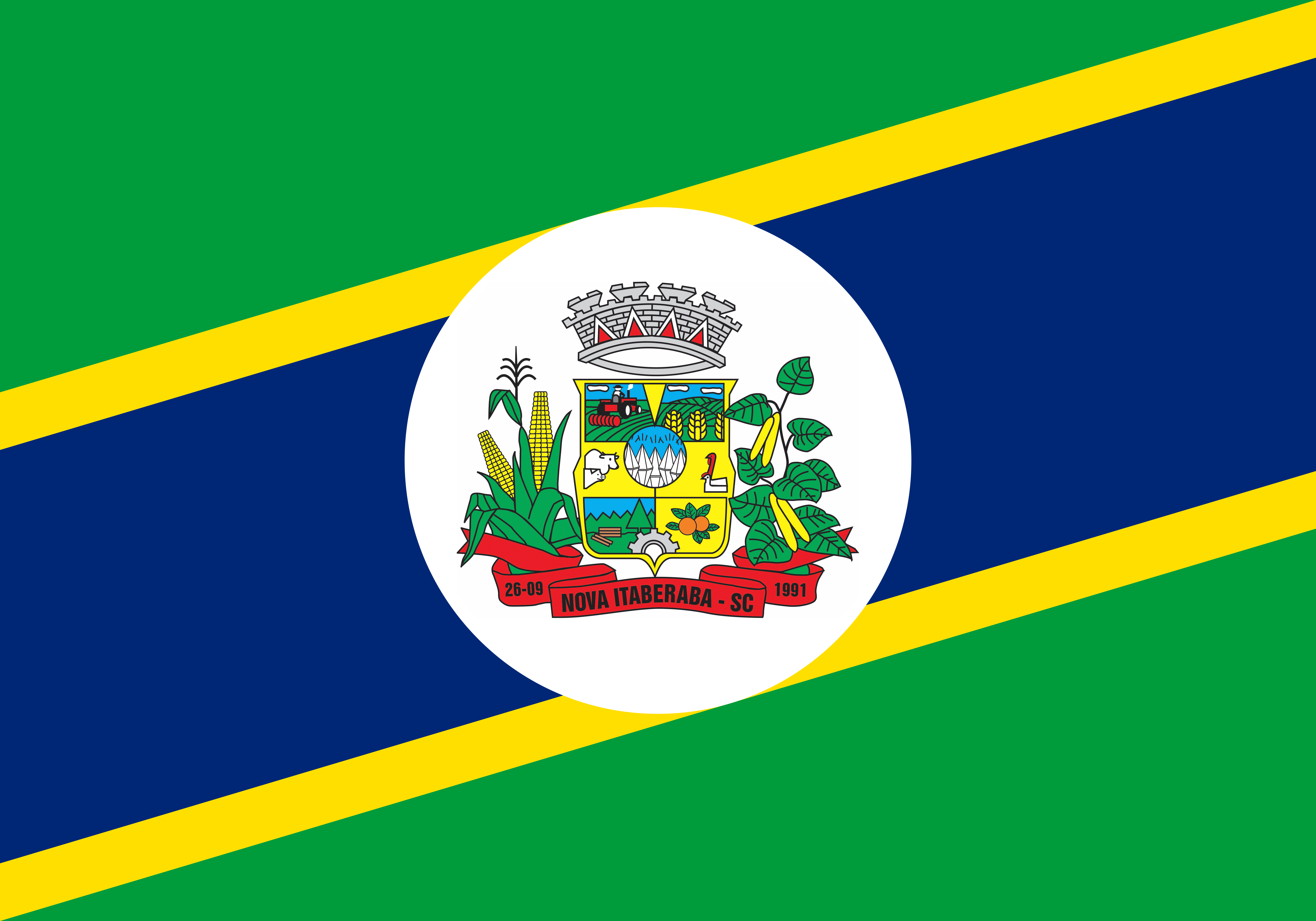
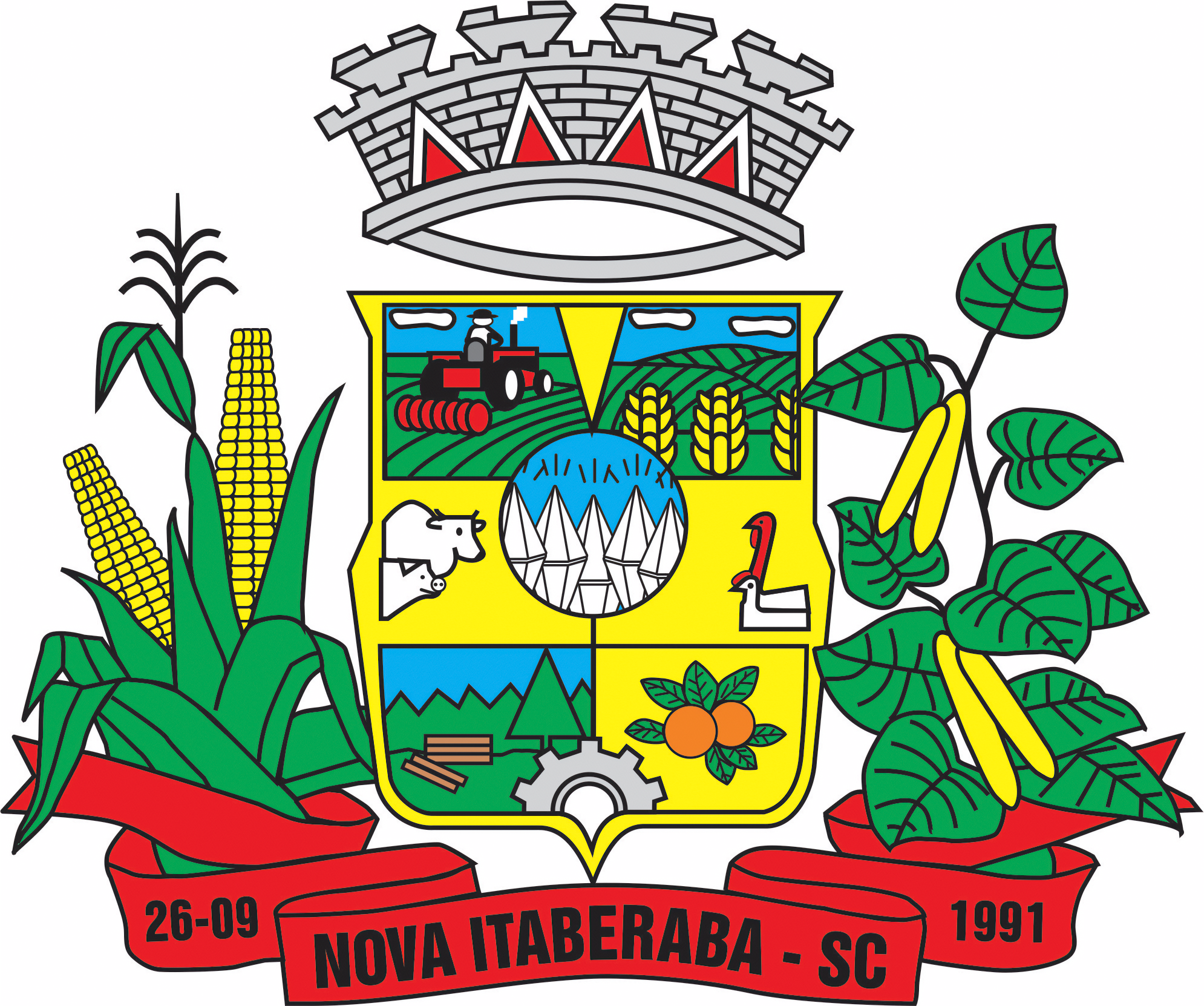
- Flag Coat of arms
- Interactive map of Nova Itaberaba
- Country: Brazil
- Region: South
- State: Santa Catarina
- Mesoregion: Oeste Catarinense

Population (2020)
  - Total: 4,329
- Time zone: UTC -3
- Website: www.novaitaberaba.sc.gov.br

Nova Itaberaba is a municipality in the state of Santa Catarina in the South region of Brazil.

== See also ==
- List of municipalities in Santa Catarina
