= Braço do Trombudo =

- Municipality
- Flag Coat of arms

- Location in Brazil
- Coordinates: 27°21′S 49°54′W
- Country: Brazil
- Region: South
- State: Santa Catarina
- Mesoregion: Vale do Itajai

Population (2020)
  - Total: 3,769
- Time zone: UTC -3
- Website: bracodotrombudo.sc.gov.br

Braço do Trombudo is a municipality in the state of Santa Catarina in the South region of Brazil.

== See also ==
- List of municipalities in Santa Catarina
