= Planalto Alegre =

Coordinates: 27.0703°S 52.8656°W

- Municipality
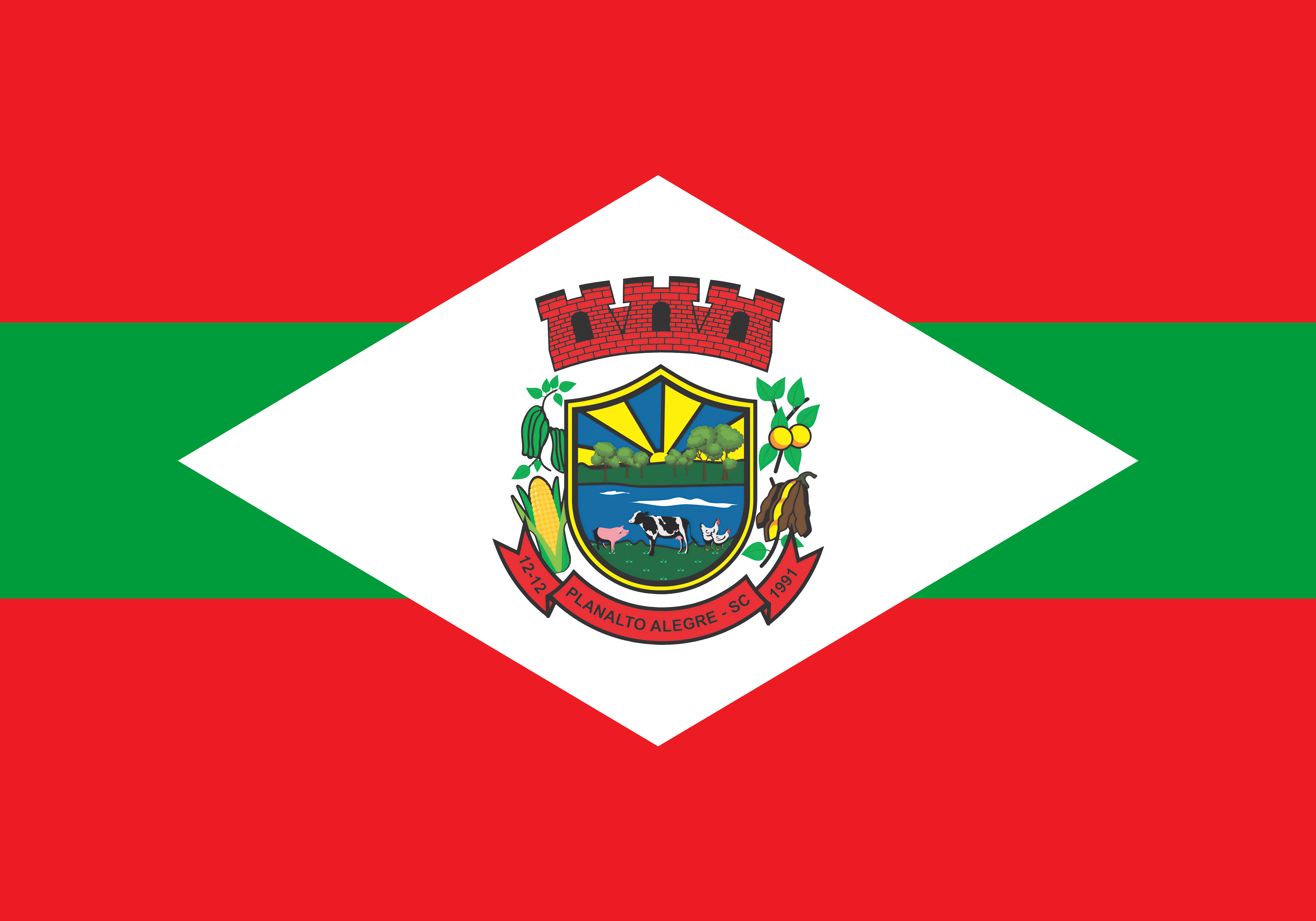
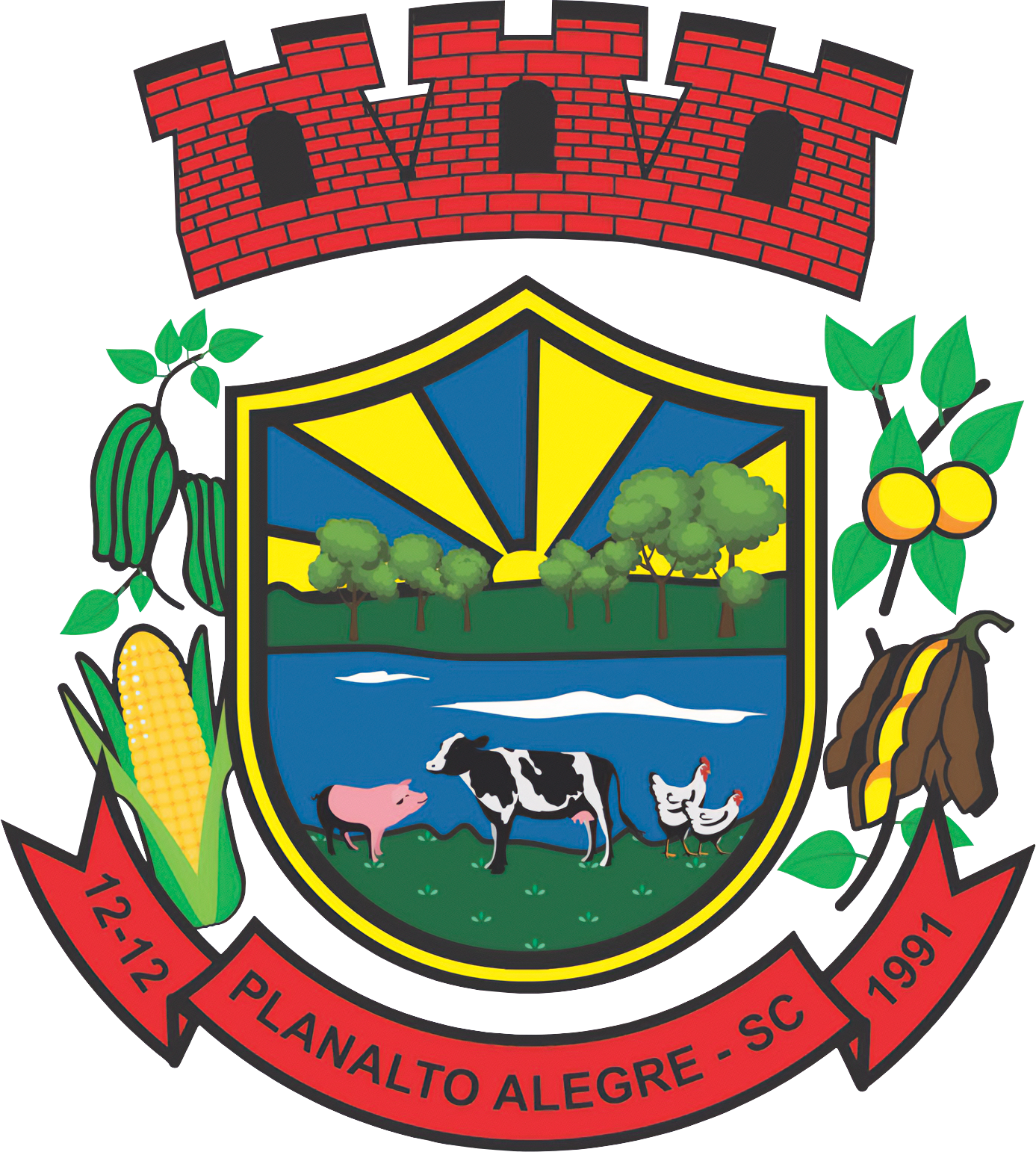
- Flag Coat of arms
- Interactive map of Planalto Alegre
- Country: Brazil
- Region: South
- State: Santa Catarina
- Mesoregion: Oeste Catarinense

Population (2020)
  - Total: 2,888
- Time zone: UTC -3
- Website: www.planaltoalegre.sc.gov.br

Planalto Alegre is a municipality in the state of Santa Catarina in the South region of Brazil.

== See also ==
- List of municipalities in Santa Catarina
