= Riqueza =

Coordinates: 27°04′01″S 53°19′19″W

- Municipality
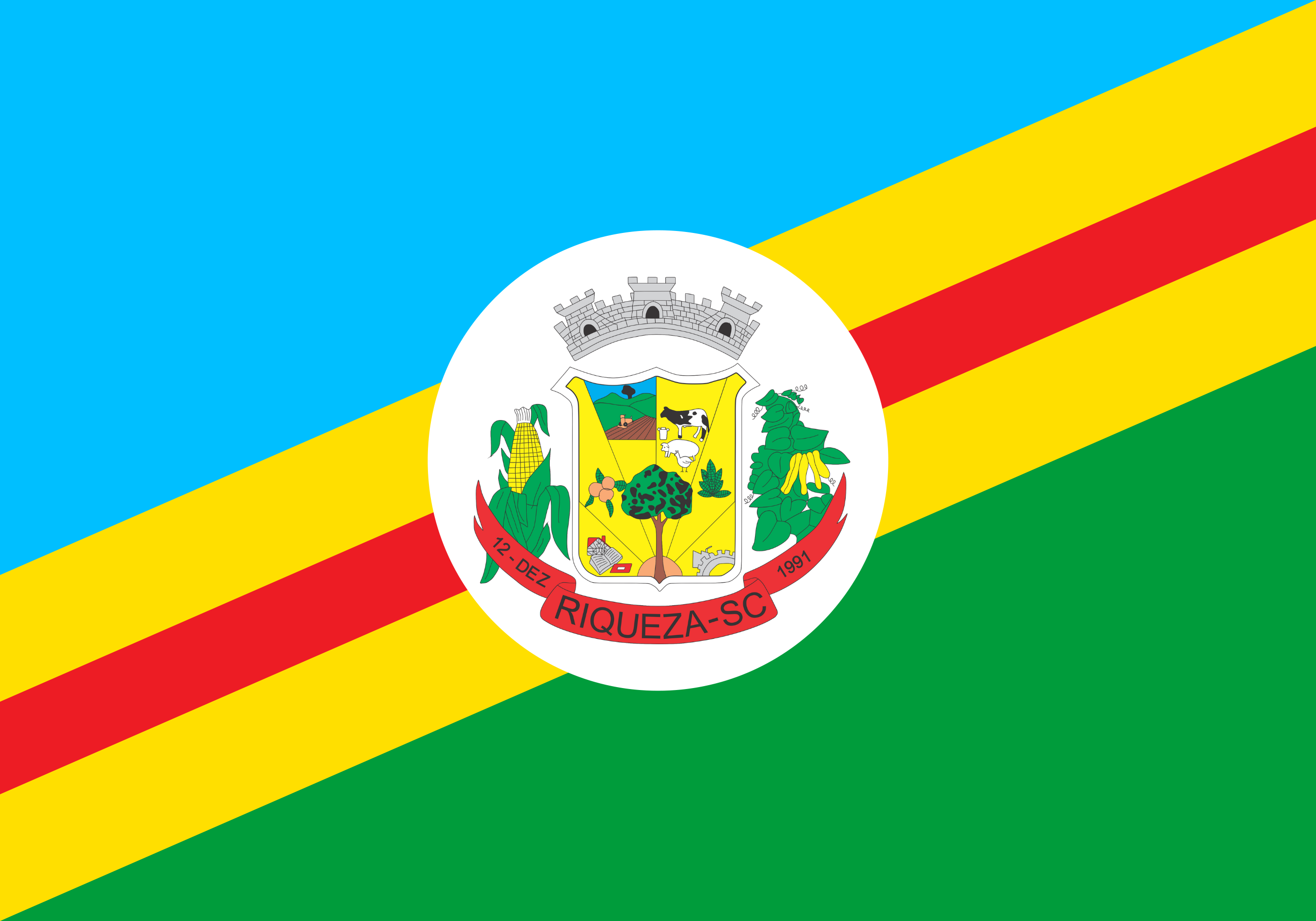
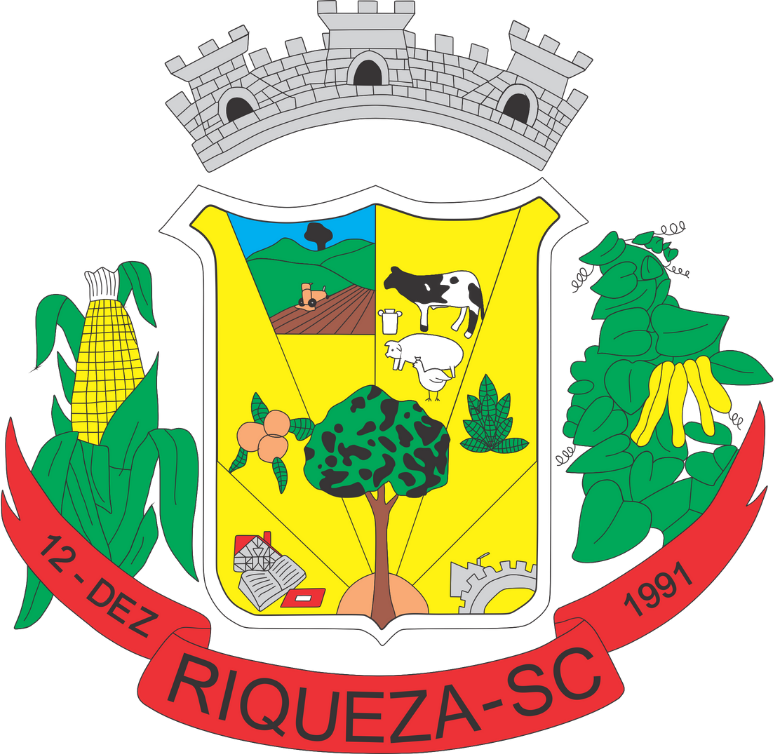
- Flag Coat of arms
- Interactive map of Riqueza
- Country: Brazil
- Region: South
- State: Santa Catarina
- Mesoregion: Oeste Catarinense

Population (2020)
  - Total: 4,561
- Time zone: UTC -3
- Website: www.riqueza.sc.gov.br

Riqueza is a municipality in the state of Santa Catarina in the South region of Brazil.

== See also ==
- List of municipalities in Santa Catarina
