= Rio do Oeste =

- Municipality
- Flag Coat of arms

- Location of Rio do Oeste

- Location in Brazil
- Coordinates: 27°11′40″S 49°47′50″W
- Country: Brazil
- Region: South
- State: Santa Catarina
- Mesoregion: Vale do Itajai

Government
  - Mayor: Humberto Pessatti

Area
  - Total: 94.617 sq mi (245.057 km^{2})
- Elevation: 1,198 ft (365 m)

Population (2020)
  - Total: 7,520
  - Density: 79.5/sq mi (30.7/km^{2})
- Time zone: UTC -3
- Website: www.riodooeste.sc.gov.br

Rio do Oeste is a municipality in the state of Santa Catarina in the South region of Brazil.

== See also ==
- List of municipalities in Santa Catarina
