= Major Gercino =

Coordinates: 27.4181°S 48.9514°W

- Municipality
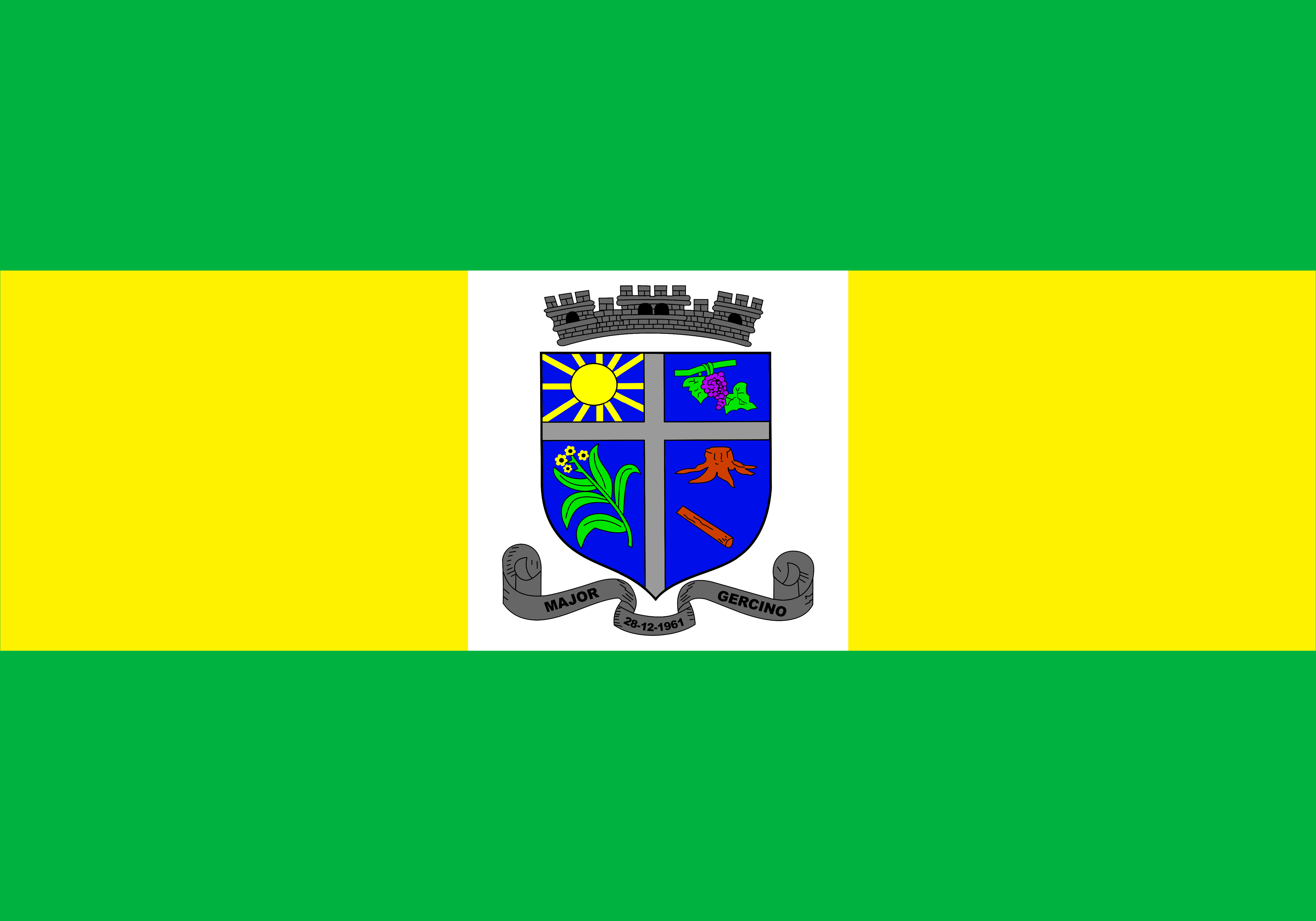
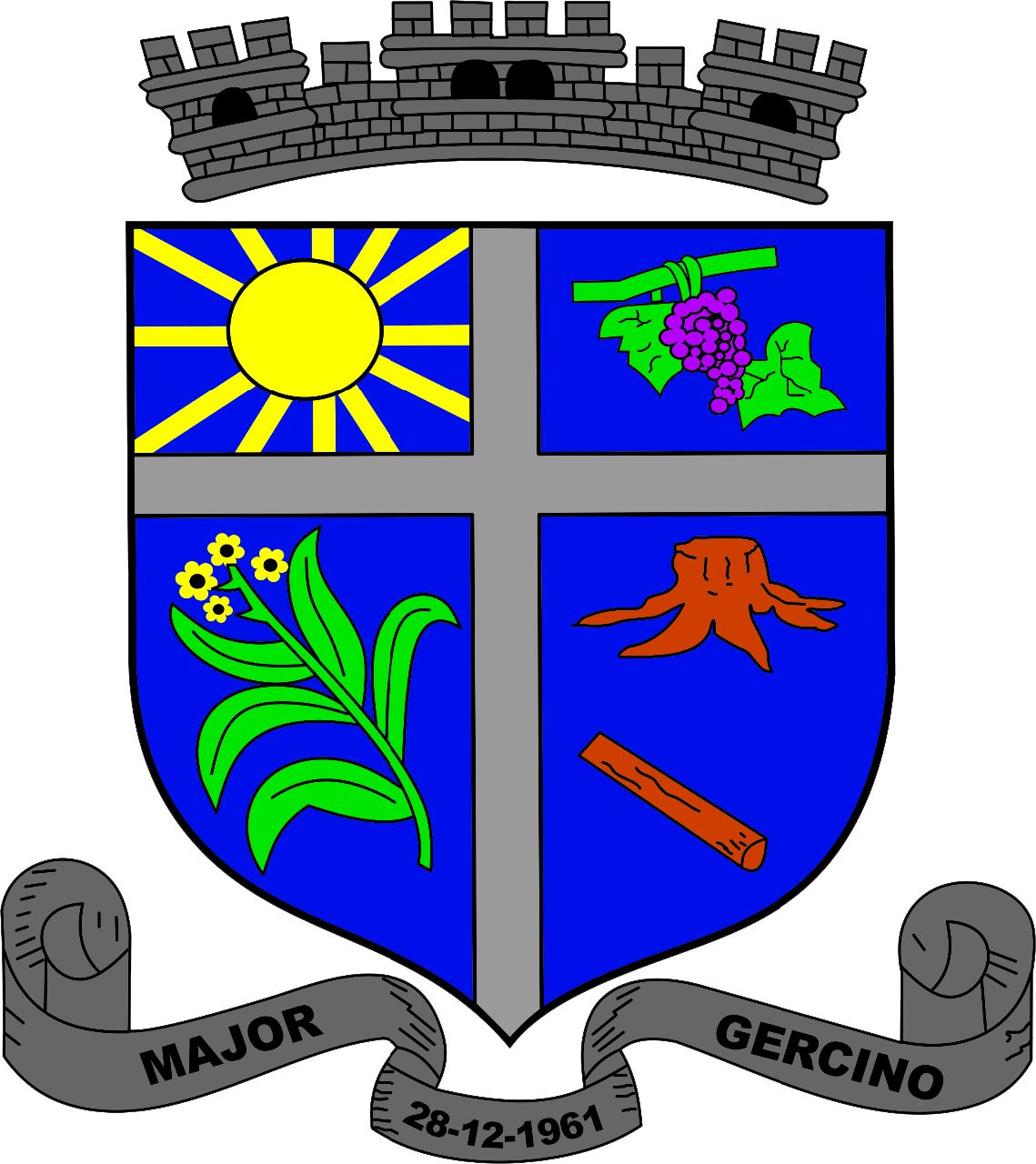
- Flag Coat of arms
- Interactive map of Major Gercino
- Country: Brazil
- Region: South
- State: Santa Catarina
- Mesoregion: Grande Florianópolis

Population (2020)
  - Total: 3,454
- Time zone: UTC -3
- Website: www.majorgercino.sc.gov.br

Major Gercino is a municipality in the state of Santa Catarina in the South region of Brazil.

== See also ==
- List of municipalities in Santa Catarina
