= Timbó Grande =

Coordinates: 26.615°S 50.6742°W

- Municipality
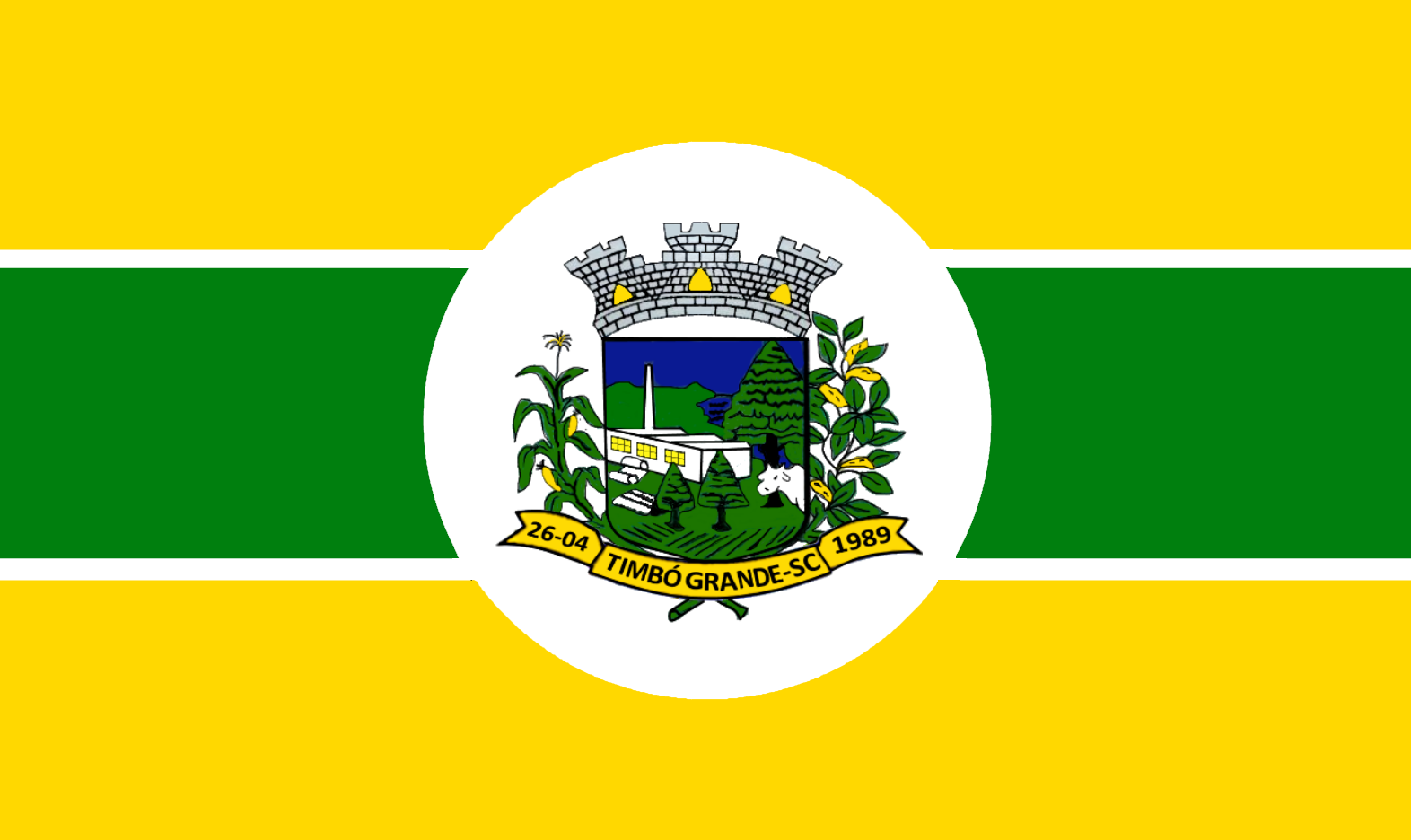
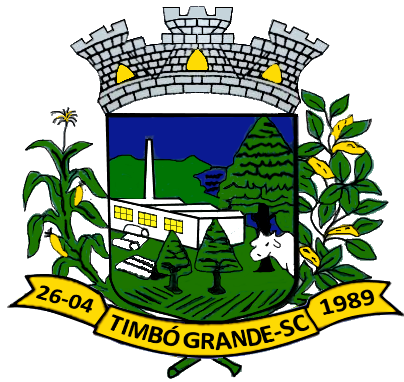
- Flag Coat of arms
- Interactive map of Timbó Grande
- Country: Brazil
- Region: South
- State: Santa Catarina
- Mesoregion: Norte Catarinense

Population (2020)
  - Total: 7,941
- Time zone: UTC -3

Timbó Grande is a municipality in the state of Santa Catarina in the South region of Brazil.

== See also ==
- List of municipalities in Santa Catarina
