= Iraceminha =

- Municipality
- Flag Coat of arms

- Location within Brazil Location within South America
- Coordinates: 26°50′S 53°15′W
- Country: Brazil
- Region: South
- State: Santa Catarina
- Mesoregion: Oeste Catarinense

Population (2020)
  - Total: 3,938
- Time zone: UTC -3
- Website: www.iraceminha.sc.gov.br

Iraceminha is a municipality in the state of Santa Catarina in the South region of Brazil.

== See also ==
- List of municipalities in Santa Catarina
