= Bela Vista do Toldo =

- Municipality
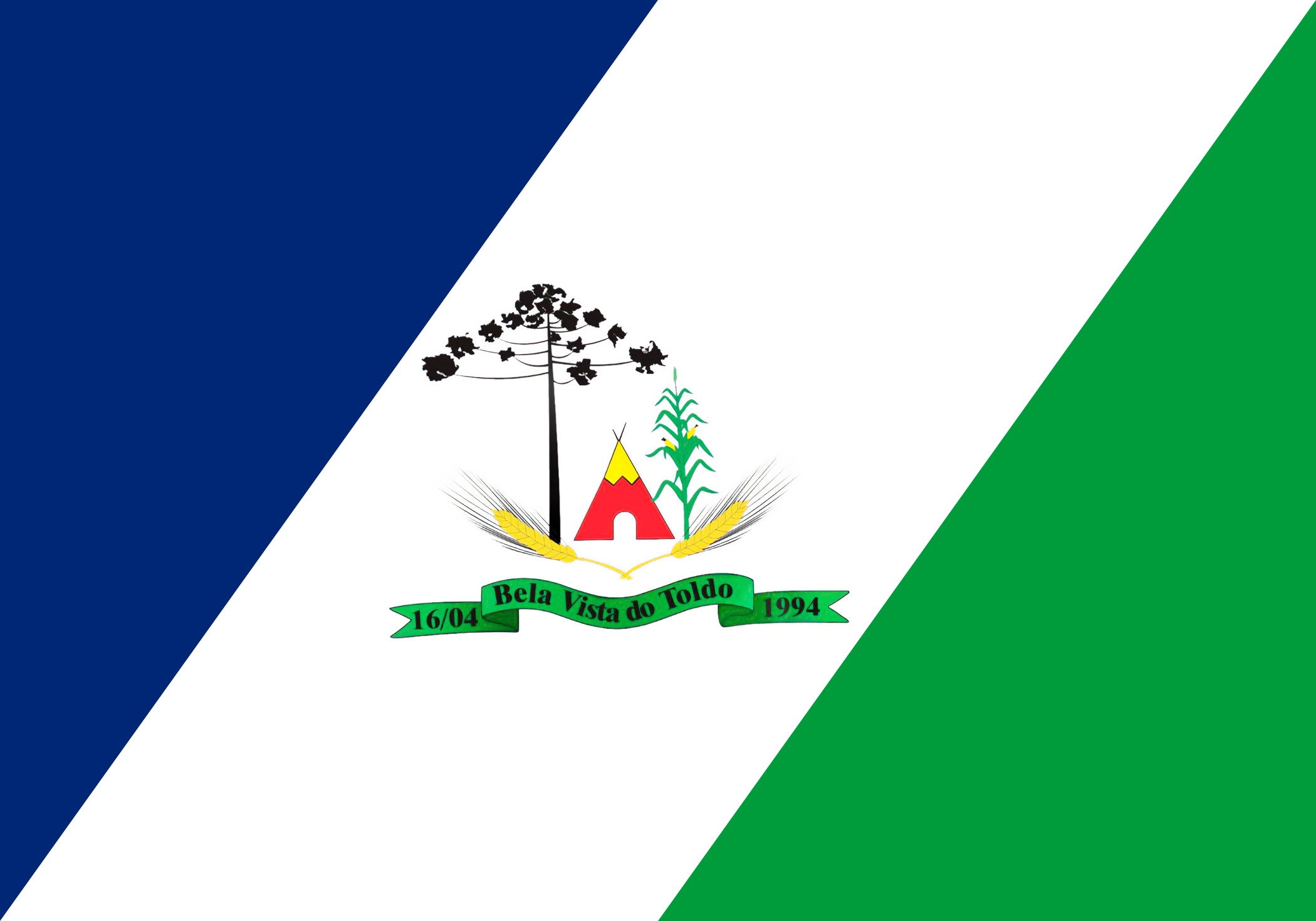
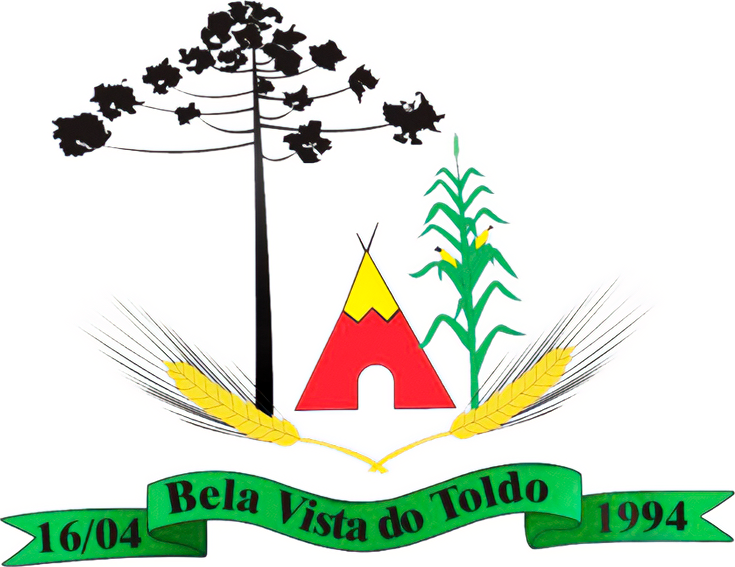
- Flag Coat of arms

- Location in Brazil
- Coordinates: 26°16′S 50°30′W
- Country: Brazil
- Region: South
- State: Santa Catarina
- Mesoregion: Norte Catarinense

Population (2020)
  - Total: 6,362
- Time zone: UTC -3
- Website: www.pmbvt.sc.gov.br

Bela Vista do Toldo is a municipality in the state of Santa Catarina in the South region of Brazil.

== See also ==
- List of municipalities in Santa Catarina
