= Pescaria Brava =

Coordinates: 28°23′S 48°53′W

- Municipality
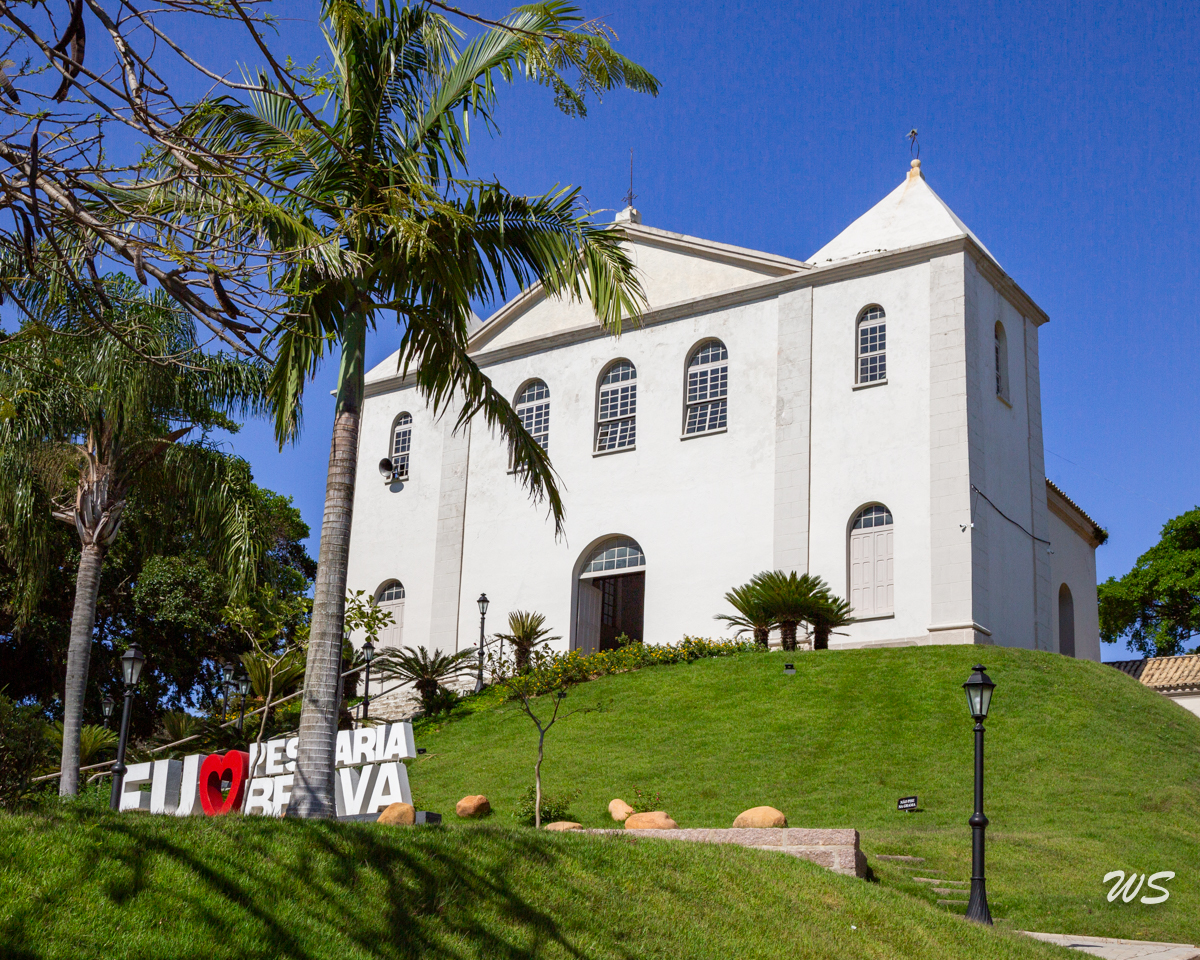

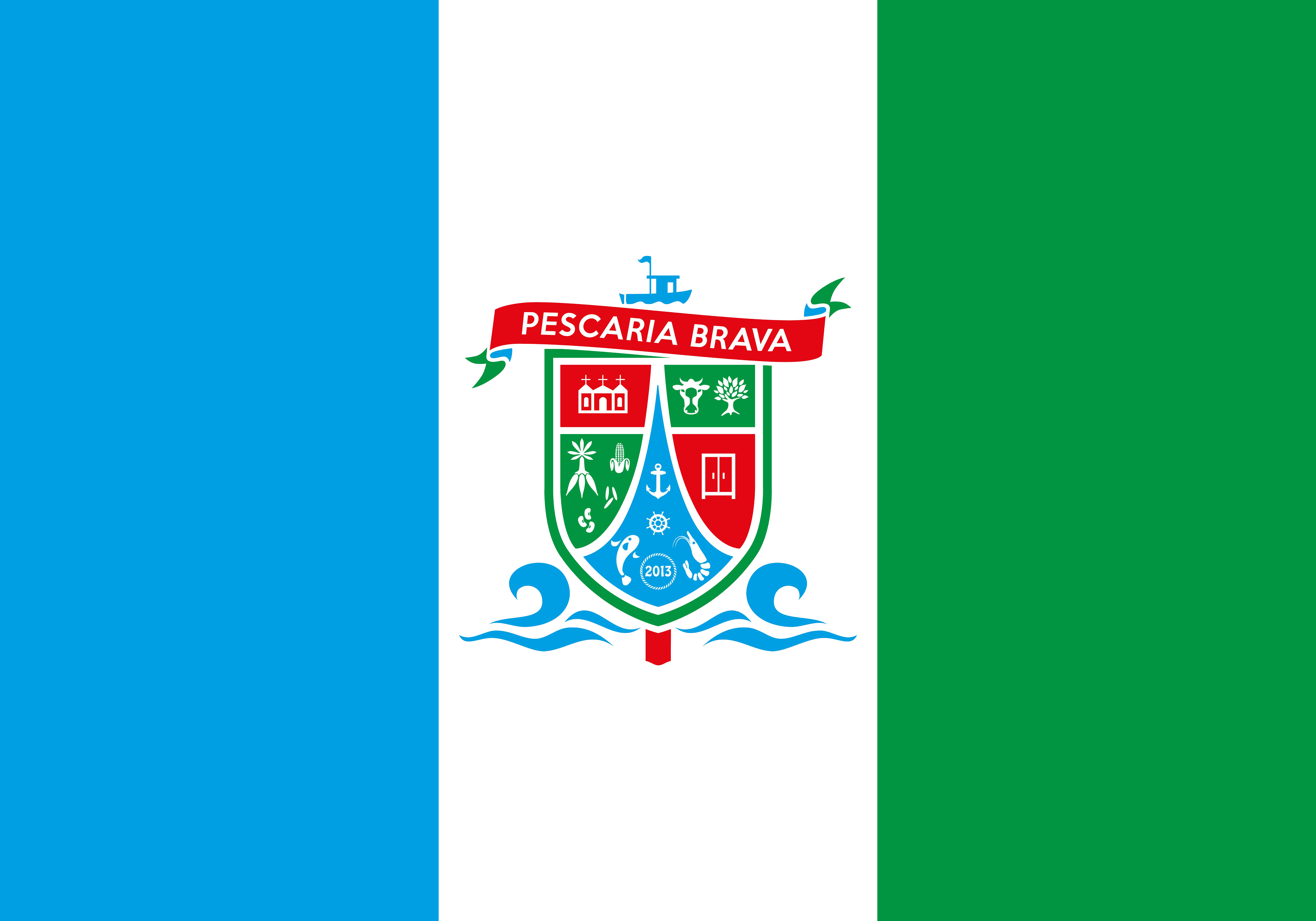
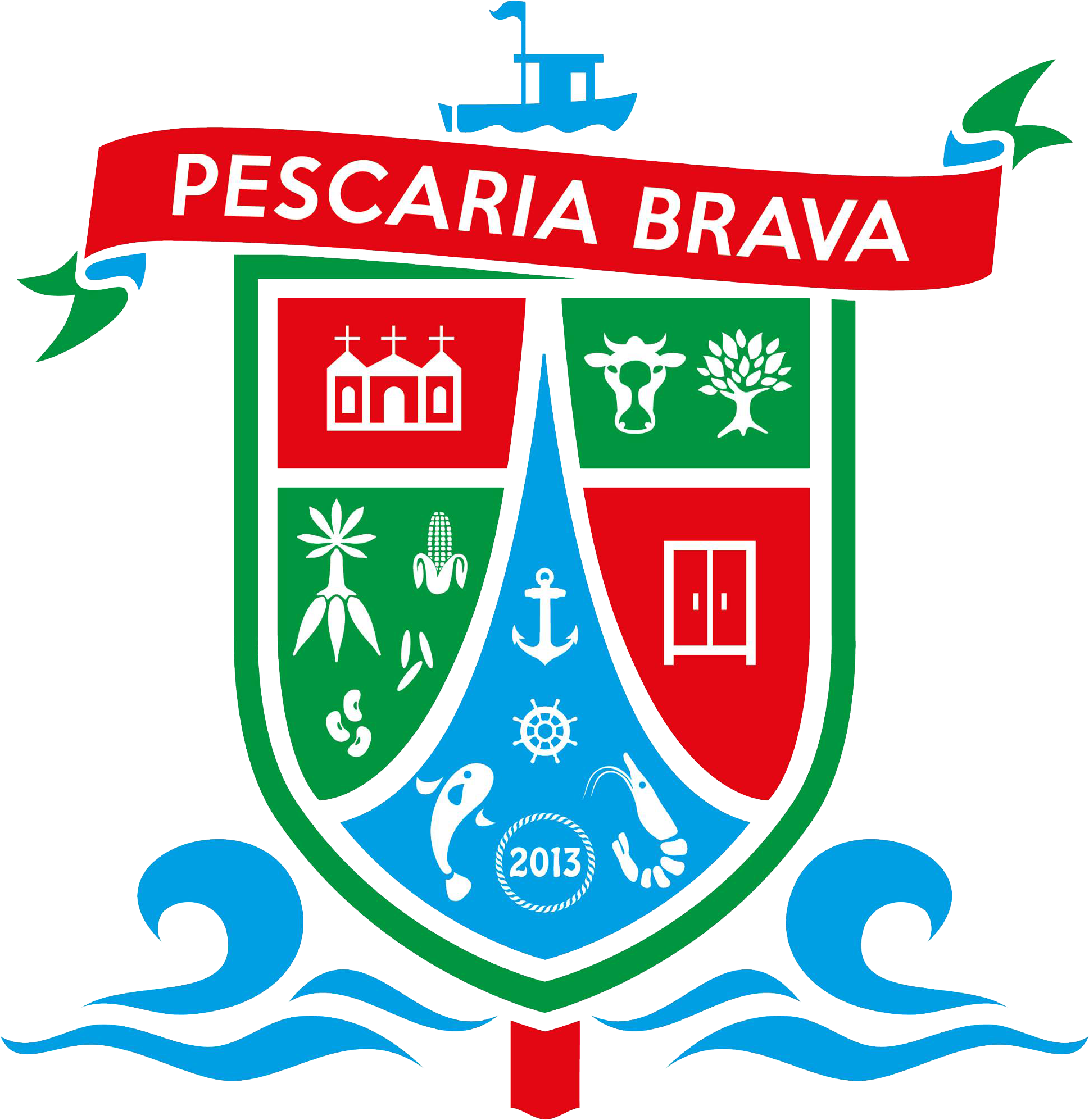
- Flag Coat of arms
- Interactive map of Pescaria Brava
- Country: Brazil
- Region: South
- State: Santa Catarina
- Mesoregion: Sul Catarinense

Population (2020)
  - Total: 10,159
- Time zone: UTC -3

Pescaria Brava is a municipality in the state of Santa Catarina in the South region of Brazil. The municipality was established in January 2013.

== See also ==
- List of municipalities in Santa Catarina
