= Rio do Campo =

- Municipality
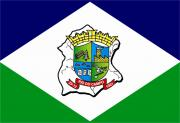
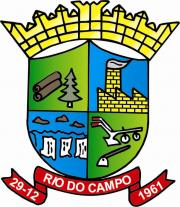
- Flag Coat of arms

- Location of Rio do Campo in the State of Santa Catarina

- Location in Brazil
- Coordinates: 26°56′56″S 50°08′27″W
- Country: Brazil
- Region: South
- State: Santa Catarina
- Mesoregion: Vale do Itajai

Area
  - Total: 193.860 sq mi (502.095 km^{2})

Population (2020)
  - Total: 5,902
  - Density: 30.44/sq mi (11.75/km^{2})
- Time zone: UTC -3

Rio do Campo is a municipality in the state of Santa Catarina in the South region of Brazil.

== See also ==
- List of municipalities in Santa Catarina
