= Salto Veloso =

Coordinates: 26.9053°S 51.4064°W

- Municipality
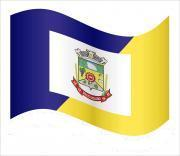
- Flag Coat of arms
- Interactive map of Salto Veloso
- Country: Brazil
- Region: South
- State: Santa Catarina
- Mesoregion: Oeste Catarinense

Population (2020)
  - Total: 4,756
- Time zone: UTC -3

Salto Veloso is a municipality in the state of Santa Catarina in the South region of Brazil.

== See also ==
- List of municipalities in Santa Catarina
