= Aurora, Santa Catarina =

Coordinates: 27.315°S 49.6378°W

Aurora
- Municipality
- Flag Coat of arms
- Interactive map of Aurora
- Country: Brazil
- Region: South
- State: Santa Catarina
- Mesoregion: Vale do Itajai

Population (2020)
  - Total: 5,683
- Time zone: UTC -3

Aurora is a municipality in the state of Santa Catarina in the South region of Brazil.

== See also ==
- List of municipalities in Santa Catarina
