= Petrolândia, Santa Catarina =

Petrolândia
- Municipality
- Flag Coat of arms

- Location in Santa Catarina state

- Location in Brazil
- Coordinates: 27°32′6″S 49°41′52″W
- Country: Brazil
- Region: South
- State: Santa Catarina

Population (2020)
  - Total: 5,905
- Time zone: UTC-03:00 (BRT)
  - Summer (DST): UTC-02:00 (BRST)
- Website: petrolandia.sc.gov.br

Petrolândia is a municipality in the state of Santa Catarina in the South region of Brazil.

== See also ==
- List of municipalities in Santa Catarina
