= Balneário Rincão =

Coordinates: 28°50′04″S 49°14′10″W

- Municipality
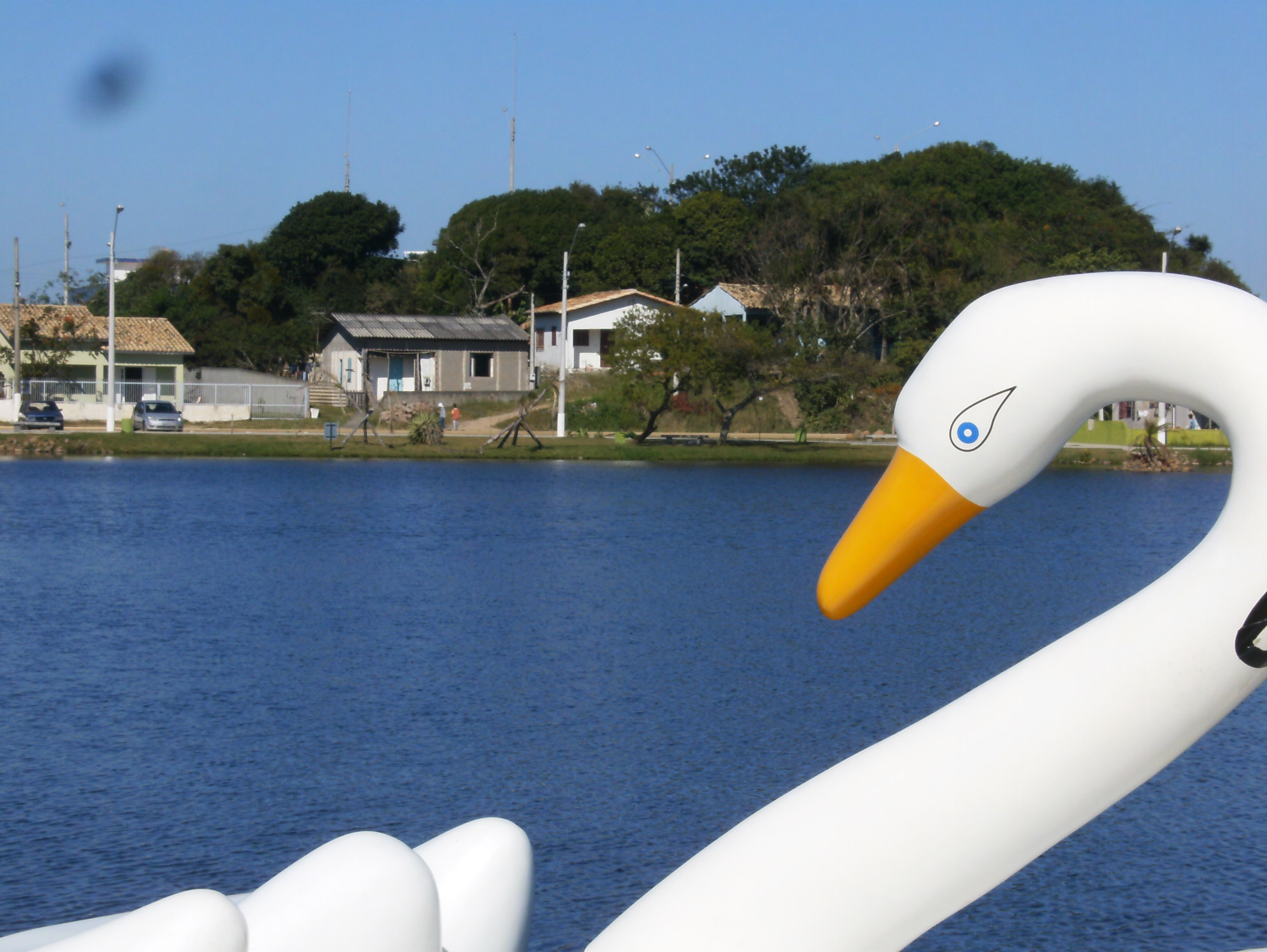

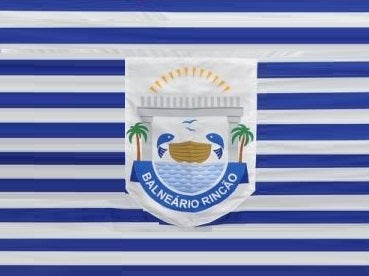
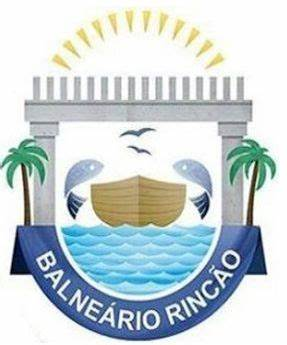
- Flag Coat of arms
- Interactive map of Balneário Rincão
- Country: Brazil
- Region: South
- State: Santa Catarina
- Mesoregion: Sul Catarinense

Population (2020)
  - Total: 12,946
- Time zone: UTC -3

Balneário Rincão is a municipality in the state of Santa Catarina in the South region of Brazil. The municipality was established in January 2013.

== See also ==
- List of municipalities in Santa Catarina
