= Tigrinhos =

- Municipality
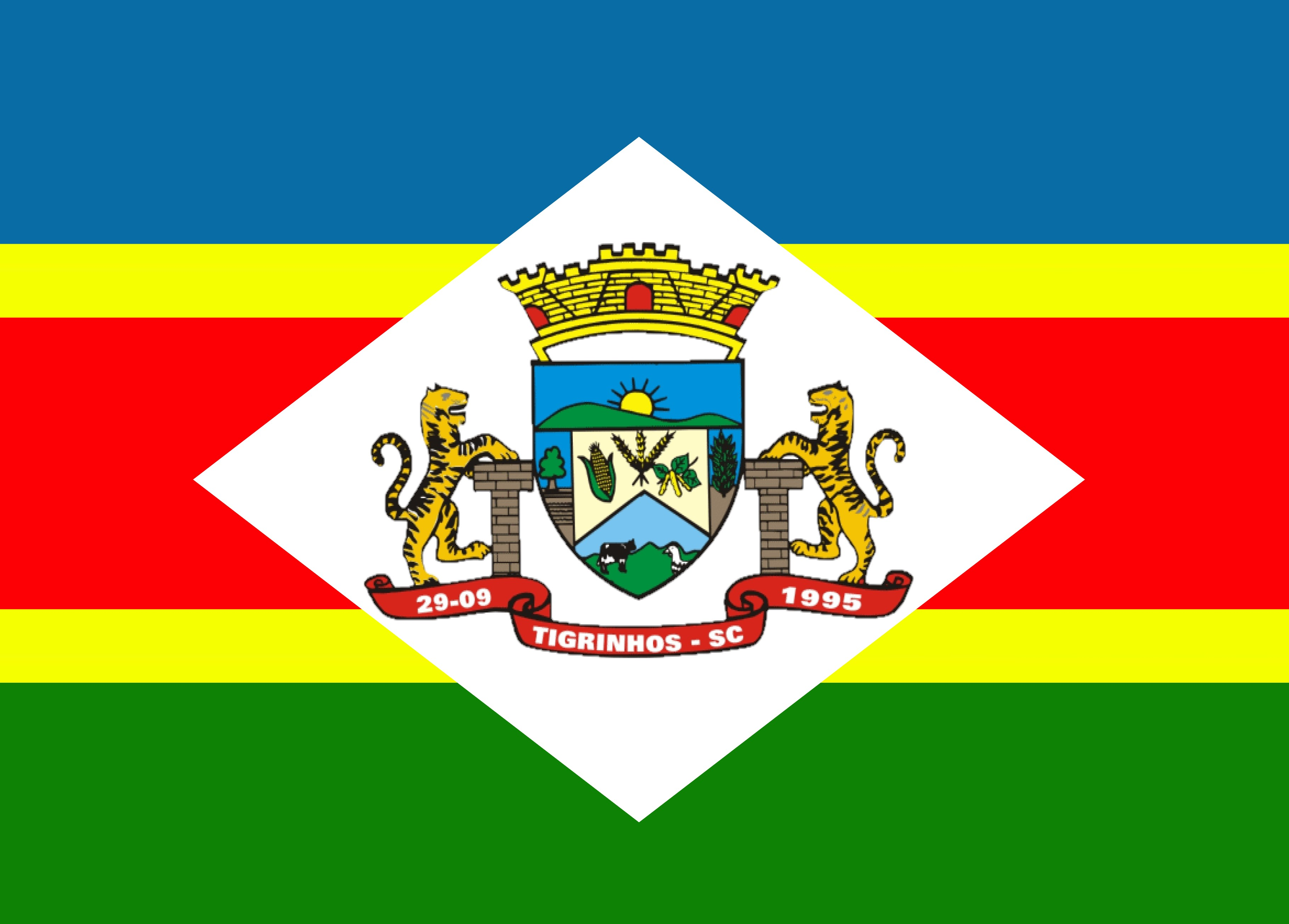
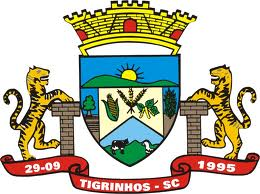
- Flag Coat of arms
- Interactive map of Tigrinhos
- Coordinates: 26.6878°S 53.1581°W
- Country: Brazil
- Region: South
- State: Santa Catarina
- Mesoregion: Oeste Catarinense

Population (2020)
  - Total: 1,619
- Time zone: UTC -3
- Website: https://www.tigrinhos.sc.gov.br/

Tigrinhos is a municipality in the state of Santa Catarina in the South region of Brazil.

== See also ==
- List of municipalities in Santa Catarina
