= Balneário Arroio do Silva =

Coordinates: 28.9839°S 49.4128°W

- Municipality
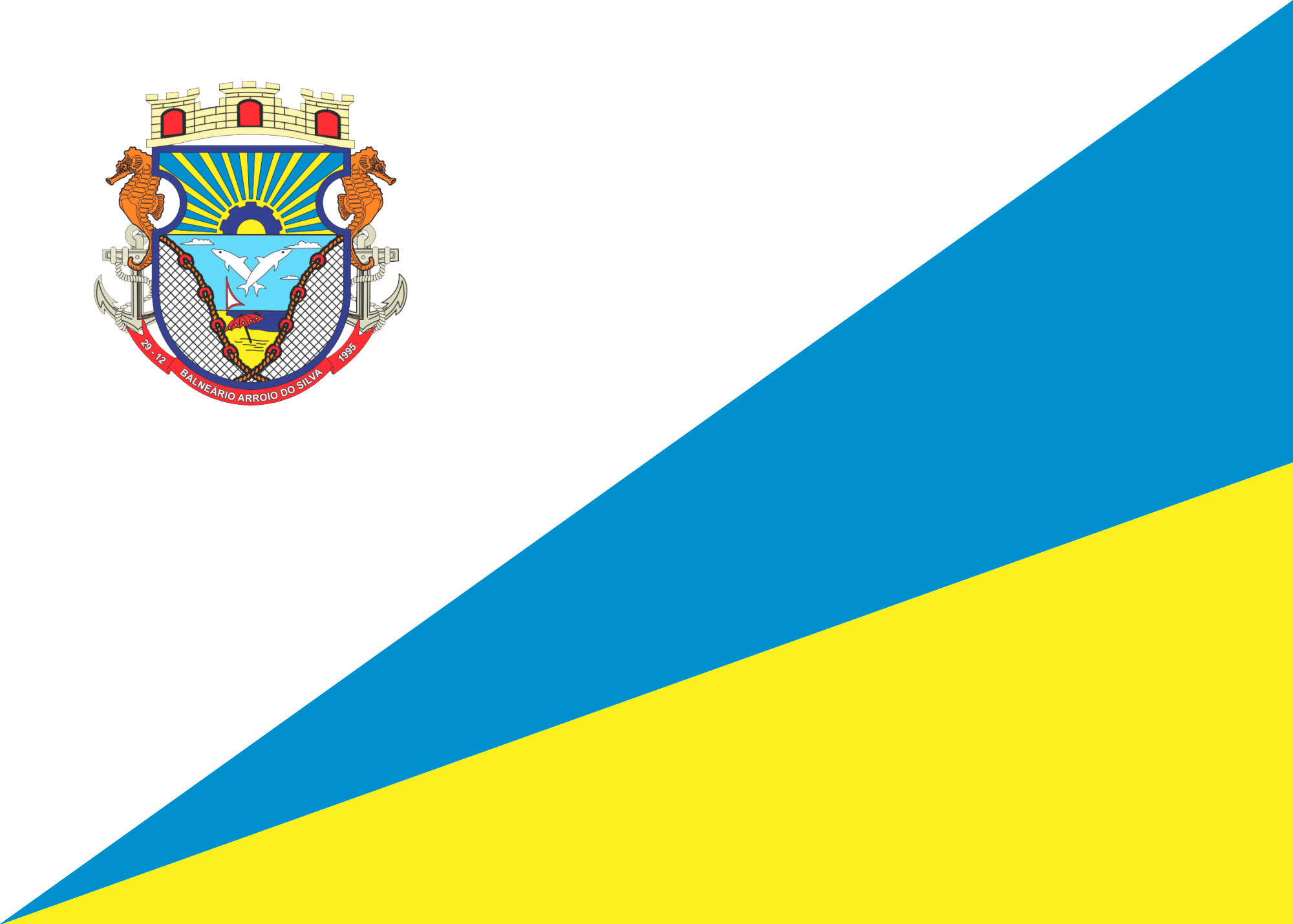
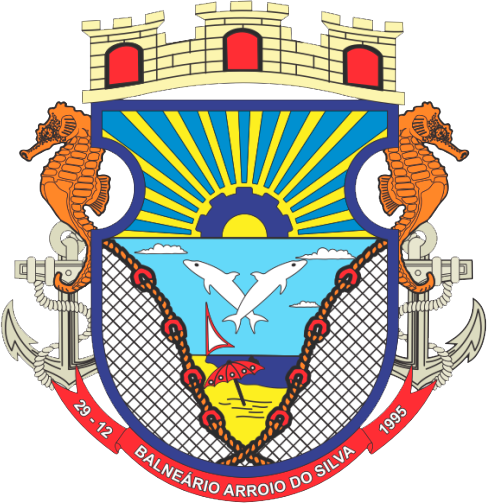
- Flag Coat of arms

- Country: Brazil
- Region: South
- State: Santa Catarina
- Mesoregion: Sul Catarinense

Population (2020)
  - Total: 13,430
- Time zone: UTC−3 (BRT)

Balneário Arroio do Silva is a municipality in the state of Santa Catarina in the South region of Brazil.

== See also ==
- List of municipalities in Santa Catarina
