= Saltinho, Santa Catarina =

Coordinates: 26°36′32″S 53°03′21″W

- Municipality
- Flag Coat of arms
- Interactive map of Saltinho, Santa Catarina
- Country: Brazil
- Region: South
- State: Santa Catarina
- Mesoregion: Oeste Catarinense

Population (2020)
  - Total: 3,754
- Time zone: UTC -3
- Website: www.saltinho.sc.gov.br

Saltinho, Santa Catarina is a municipality in the state of Santa Catarina in the South region of Brazil.

== See also ==
- List of municipalities in Santa Catarina
