= Agronômica, Santa Catarina =

Agronômica
- Municipality
- Flag Coat of arms

- Location of Agronômica

- Location within Brazil
- Coordinates: 27°15′54″S 49°42′39″W
- Country: Brazil
- Region: South
- State: (Santa Catarina (state)) Santa Catarina
- Founded: June 6, 1964

Government
  - Mayor: Paulo Roberto Tschumi

Area
  - Total: 135.923 km^{2} (52.480 sq mi)
- Elevation: 347 m (1,138 ft)

Population (2020)
  - Total: 5,509
  - Density: 34/km^{2} (88/sq mi)
- Time zone: UTC−3 (BRT)
- HDI (2000): 0.811
- Website: agronomica.sc.gov.br

Agronômica (Agronomic) is a Brazilian municipality in the state of Santa Catarina.
