= List of municipalities in Santa Catarina by HDI =

This is a list of municipalities in Santa Catarina ordered by Human Development Index (HDI) according to data released by the United Nations Development Program (UNDP) of the United Nations for the 2010. The Human Development Index was developed in 1990 by the Pakistani economist Mahbub ul Haq and the Indian economist Amartya Sen.

According to the list. of the 293 municipalities in the state of Santa Catarina, 11 have very high HDI (equal to or greater than 0.800), 246 have high HDI (between 0.700 and 0.799), 38 have medium (between 0.600 and 0.699), none of them have low (between 0.500 and 0.599), and none of them have very low (less than 0.500). The HDI of Santa Catarina is 0.819 (considered very high).

== Criteria ==
Map of HDI of the municipalities of Santa Catarina. Legend: Very high High Medium Low Very low

=== Categories ===
The index varies from 0 to 1, considering:

- Very high – 0.800 to 1.000
- High – 0.700 to 0.799
- Medium – 0.600 to 0.699
- Low – 0.500 to 0.599
- Very low – 0.000 to 0.499

=== Components ===
The HDI of the municipalities is an average between the income index, life expectancy index and educational index.

== List ==
Rank	Municipalities	Data of 2010			
Rank	Municipalities	HDI	Income Index	Life Expectancy Index	Educational Index
Very high HDI
1	Florianópolis	0.847	0.870	0.873	0.800
2	Balneário Camboriú	0.845	0.854	0.894	0.789
3	Joaçaba	0.827	0.823	0.891	0.771
4	Joinville	0.809	0.795	0.889	0.749
4	São José	0.809	0.799	0.880	0.752
6	Blumenau	0.806	0.812	0.894	0.722
6	Rio Fortuna	0.806	0.848	0.850	0.727
8	Jaraguá do Sul	0.803	0.793	0.865	0.755
9	Rio do Sul	0.802	0.793	0.894	0.727
10	São Miguel do Oeste	0.801	0.787	0.884	0.739
11	Concórdia	0.800	0.777	0.872	0.756
high HDI
12	Itapema	0.796	0.788	0.881	0.727
12	Tubarão	0.796	0.788	0.866	0.740
14	Brusque	0.795	0.794	0.894	0.707
14	Iomerê	0.795	0.754	0.891	0.749
14	Itajaí	0.795	0.778	0.884	0.730
14	Treze Tílias	0.795	0.838	0.874	0.685
18	Chapecó	0.790	0.779	0.871	0.727
19	Luzerna	0.789	0.781	0.877	0.718
20	Criciúma	0.788	0.786	0.846	0.737
21	Porto União	0.786	0.752	0.891	0.724
22	Salto Veloso	0.784	0.778	0.880	0.705
22	Timbó	0.784	0.807	0.856	0.697
24	Pinhalzinho	0.783	0.758	0.886	0.716
25	São Bento do Sul	0.782	0.763	0.871	0.719
26	Bombinhas	0.781	0.753	0.864	0.732
26	Lacerdópolis	0.781	0.763	0.883	0.708
26	Maravilha	0.781	0.758	0.886	0.708
26	Santo Amaro da Imperatriz	0.781	0.753	0.890	0.710
30	Braço do Trombudo	0.780	0.766	0.883	0.702
30	Cocal do Sul	0.780	0.747	0.859	0.740
30	Corupá	0.780	0.768	0.873	0.707
30	Pomerode	0.780	0.780	0.886	0.687
34	Seara	0.779	0.804	0.872	0.674
35	Braço do Norte	0.778	0.746	0.881	0.716
36	Indaial	0.777	0.767	0.873	0.701
36	Mafra	0.777	0.738	0.880	0.723
36	Pinheiro Preto	0.777	0.762	0.866	0.712
39	Itapiranga	0.775	0.766	0.842	0.723
39	Trombudo Central	0.775	0.760	0.880	0.696
39	Xanxerê	0.775	0.760	0.861	0.711
42	Massaranduba	0.774	0.749	0.867	0.714
42	Ouro	0.774	0.774	0.884	0.677
42	Siderópolis	0.774	0.751	0.880	0.701
42	Treviso	0.774	0.737	0.882	0.714
46	Serra Alta	0.773	0.758	0.879	0.694
47	Urussanga	0.772	0.756	0.876	0.695
48	Itá	0.771	0.747	0.879	0.698
48	Lajeado Grande	0.771	0.750	0.858	0.712
50	Armazém	0.770	0.743	0.882	0.698
50	Lages	0.770	0.755	0.867	0.697
50	Presidente Castelo Branco	0.770	0.813	0.883	0.637
53	São Carlos	0.769	0.763	0.867	0.688
53	Schroeder	0.769	0.750	0.855	0.710
55	Maracajá	0.768	0.752	0.861	0.699
55	Nova Veneza	0.768	0.741	0.869	0.703
57	Capivari de Baixo	0.767	0.724	0.870	0.716
58	Peritiba	0.766	0.762	0.882	0.669
59	Gaspar	0.765	0.770	0.889	0.655
59	Imbituba	0.765	0.734	0.868	0.703
59	Nova Erechim	0.765	0.767	0.851	0.686
59	São Domingos	0.765	0.769	0.861	0.675
63	Arroio Trinta	0.764	0.781	0.873	0.653
63	Videira	0.764	0.772	0.857	0.675
65	São Francisco do Sul	0.762	0.740	0.856	0.699
66	Itapoá	0.761	0.739	0.874	0.682
66	São João do Oeste	0.761	0.756	0.873	0.668
66	Taió	0.761	0.749	0.879	0.670
66	Zortéa	0.761	0.752	0.885	0.661
70	Araranguá	0.760	0.745	0.853	0.691
70	Modelo	0.760	0.751	0.886	0.659
70	Porto Belo	0.760	0.750	0.886	0.660
70	Tijucas	0.760	0.747	0.873	0.672
74	Iporã do Oeste	0.759	0.743	0.847	0.695
75	Presidente Getúlio	0.759	0.764	0.874	0.654
76	Faxinal dos Guedes	0.758	0.746	0.863	0.676
76	Herval d'Oeste	0.758	0.740	0.859	0.684
76	Piratuba	0.758	0.736	0.829	0.714
79	Canoinhas	0.757	0.717	0.874	0.692
79	Gravatal	0.757	0.726	0.877	0.681
79	Palhoça	0.757	0.752	0.859	0.672
79	Santa Rosa de Lima	0.757	0.726	0.843	0.710
83	Balneário Piçarras	0.756	0.745	0.869	0.668
84	Alto Bela Vista	0.755	0.734	0.882	0.664
84	Orleans	0.755	0.749	0.873	0.657
84	São Ludgero	0.755	0.756	0.834	0.683
84	Saudades	0.755	0.723	0.850	0.700
88	Cunhataí	0.754	0.777	0.886	0.623
88	Guabiruba	0.754	0.750	0.876	0.653
88	Rio do Oeste	0.754	0.769	0.892	0.625
88	Rodeio	0.754	0.769	0.889	0.626
92	Forquilhinha	0.753	0.754	0.861	0.657
92	Garopaba	0.753	0.737	0.868	0.668
92	Rancho Queimado	0.753	0.743	0.893	0.644
95	Capinzal	0.752	0.742	0.869	0.659
95	Laguna	0.752	0.715	0.871	0.682
95	Tunápolis	0.752	0.728	0.830	0.704
95	Xaxim	0.752	0.737	0.871	0.662
99	Guaraciaba	0.751	0.754	0.871	0.646
99	Guaramirim	0.751	0.748	0.885	0.641
99	Planalto Alegre	0.751	0.731	0.881	0.659
102	Antônio Carlos	0.749	0.768	0.890	0.615
102	Laurentino	0.749	0.742	0.855	0.662
102	São Lourenço do Oeste	0.749	0.748	0.807	0.695
102	Xavantina	0.749	0.772	0.861	0.632
106	Ituporanga	0.748	0.749	0.876	0.638
106	Mondaí	0.748	0.728	0.875	0.657
106	Nova Trento	0.748	0.749	0.891	0.628
109	Cordilheira Alta	0.747	0.735	0.855	0.662
109	Governador Celso Ramos	0.747	0.737	0.870	0.651
111	Balneário Arroio do Silva	0.746	0.753	0.858	0.642
112	Águas Frias	0.745	0.728	0.860	0.661
113	Coronel Freitas	0.744	0.732	0.860	0.653
113	Salete	0.744	0.737	0.803	0.695
115	Descanso	0.743	0.741	0.854	0.647
115	Lindóia do Sul	0.743	0.747	0.865	0.636
115	Marema	0.743	0.748	0.862	0.636
115	Penha	0.743	0.739	0.867	0.640
119	Ascurra	0.742	0.739	0.868	0.636
119	Campos Novos	0.742	0.721	0.861	0.658
119	Cunha Porã	0.742	0.744	0.804	0.682
119	Dona Emma	0.742	0.762	0.862	0.622
119	Irani	0.742	0.715	0.847	0.675
119	São Martinho	0.742	0.754	0.830	0.654
125	Agronômica	0.741	0.774	0.884	0.595
125	Içara	0.741	0.732	0.861	0.645
127	Benedito Novo	0.740	0.723	0.868	0.645
127	Otacílio Costa	0.740	0.713	0.835	0.681
127	São João Batista	0.740	0.739	0.865	0.634
127	Turvo	0.740	0.742	0.867	0.631
131	Biguaçu	0.739	0.733	0.836	0.659
132	Barra Velha	0.738	0.735	0.857	0.639
132	Ilhota	0.738	0.750	0.883	0.607
132	Ipumirim	0.738	0.747	0.853	0.631
132	Meleiro	0.738	0.734	0.808	0.679
132	Morro da Fumaça	0.738	0.732	0.825	0.665
132	Rio Negrinho	0.738	0.710	0.848	0.668
132	São João do Itaperiú	0.738	0.714	0.873	0.645
139	Ibirama	0.737	0.749	0.848	0.630
139	Luiz Alves	0.737	0.766	0.870	0.600
139	Palmitos	0.737	0.757	0.836	0.632
139	Presidente Nereu	0.737	0.765	0.861	0.609
139	Tangará	0.737	0.748	0.867	0.617
144	Grão Pará	0.736	0.749	0.846	0.630
144	Ipira	0.736	0.724	0.838	0.657
144	Navegantes	0.736	0.731	0.873	0.624
144	Nova Itaberaba	0.736	0.753	0.876	0.605
148	Caçador	0.735	0.728	0.878	0.620
148	Lauro Müller	0.735	0.714	0.822	0.677
150	São Pedro de Alcântara	0.734	0.757	0.846	0.618
151	Arabutã	0.733	0.744	0.863	0.614
151	Atalanta	0.733	0.736	0.802	0.668
151	Aurora	0.733	0.748	0.870	0.606
154	Jaborá	0.732	0.746	0.801	0.657
155	Fraiburgo	0.731	0.712	0.860	0.637
155	São Bonifácio	0.731	0.729	0.860	0.622
155	São José do Cedro	0.731	0.753	0.830	0.625
158	Guarujá do Sul	0.730	0.732	0.833	0.639
158	Quilombo	0.730	0.712	0.832	0.656
160	Rio do Campo	0.729	0.741	0.803	0.650
160	Rio dos Cedros	0.729	0.739	0.827	0.634
160	Treze de Maio	0.729	0.729	0.881	0.602
163	Balneário Gaivota	0.728	0.734	0.844	0.622
163	Caibi	0.728	0.737	0.830	0.631
163	Pedras Grandes	0.728	0.715	0.870	0.621
163	Santiago do Sul	0.728	0.731	0.811	0.652
163	Sombrio	0.728	0.729	0.858	0.617
168	Santa Helena	0.727	0.705	0.833	0.653
169	Camboriú	0.726	0.736	0.866	0.600
169	Ermo	0.726	0.708	0.808	0.670
171	Agrolândia	0.725	0.727	0.827	0.633
171	Garuva	0.725	0.717	0.830	0.640
171	Ibiam	0.725	0.737	0.820	0.631
174	Botuverá	0.724	0.741	0.848	0.604
175	Águas Mornas	0.723	0.731	0.853	0.606
175	Erval Velho	0.723	0.736	0.868	0.592
177	Iraceminha	0.722	0.710	0.845	0.628
178	Curitibanos	0.721	0.716	0.846	0.620
178	Jaguaruna	0.721	0.719	0.830	0.628
180	Passo de Torres	0.720	0.695	0.869	0.618
180	Pouso Redondo	0.720	0.728	0.857	0.598
180	Timbé do Sul	0.720	0.721	0.856	0.606
183	Celso Ramos	0.719	0.651	0.826	0.692
183	Jupiá	0.719	0.708	0.862	0.610
185	Bom Jesus	0.718	0.740	0.827	0.606
185	Paial	0.718	0.705	0.847	0.620
185	Praia Grande	0.718	0.692	0.840	0.636
185	Vargem Bonita	0.718	0.705	0.801	0.656
189	Guatambú	0.717	0.716	0.823	0.626
189	Tigrinhos	0.717	0.688	0.846	0.633
191	Balneário Barra do Sul	0.716	0.713	0.844	0.611
191	Doutor Pedrinho	0.716	0.714	0.843	0.609
191	Jacinto Machado	0.716	0.708	0.818	0.633
191	Paulo Lopes	0.716	0.707	0.865	0.600
191	Petrolândia	0.716	0.740	0.802	0.618
196	Arvoredo	0.715	0.713	0.842	0.610
196	Formosa do Sul	0.715	0.728	0.845	0.593
198	Campo Alegre	0.714	0.677	0.845	0.636
198	Catanduvas	0.714	0.723	0.806	0.625
198	Riqueza	0.714	0.702	0.830	0.624
201	Águas de Chapecó	0.713	0.712	0.811	0.629
201	Imbuia	0.713	0.716	0.840	0.602
203	Bom Jesus do Oeste	0.712	0.725	0.830	0.601
204	São Miguel da Boa Vista	0.710	0.733	0.795	0.615
204	Witmarsum	0.710	0.739	0.870	0.557
206	Jardinópolis	0.709	0.708	0.823	0.611
207	Apiúna	0.708	0.735	0.827	0.584
207	Flor do Sertão	0.708	0.736	0.792	0.608
207	Galvão	0.708	0.704	0.815	0.618
207	Ibicaré	0.708	0.734	0.826	0.586
207	Itaiópolis	0.708	0.700	0.836	0.606
207	Mirim Doce	0.708	0.683	0.821	0.633
213	Irati	0.707	0.694	0.836	0.609
213	Sul Brasil	0.707	0.713	0.832	0.595
215	Dionísio Cerqueira	0.706	0.703	0.820	0.610
215	Novo Horizonte	0.706	0.700	0.846	0.594
215	Princesa	0.706	0.701	0.820	0.611
215	Três Barras	0.706	0.677	0.814	0.639
219	Belmonte	0.705	0.699	0.820	0.611
219	Santa Rosa do Sul	0.705	0.702	0.806	0.618
219	União do Oeste	0.705	0.703	0.823	0.606
222	Chapadão do Lageado	0.704	0.680	0.833	0.616
222	Lontras	0.704	0.735	0.820	0.579
222	Palma Sola	0.704	0.700	0.800	0.622
222	Papanduva	0.704	0.691	0.836	0.603
226	Araquari	0.703	0.696	0.830	0.602
227	Correia Pinto	0.702	0.701	0.804	0.614
228	Barra Bonita	0.701	0.692	0.830	0.599
228	Morro Grande	0.701	0.742	0.847	0.548
230	Paraíso	0.700	0.728	0.833	0.565
230	Sangão	0.700	0.725	0.853	0.554
230	Vidal Ramos	0.700	0.728	0.802	0.588
Medium HDI
233	Anchieta	0.699	0.703	0.800	0.608
233	Bom Retiro	0.699	0.704	0.869	0.559
233	Irineópolis	0.699	0.720	0.836	0.567
233	Urupema	0.699	0.667	0.823	0.622
237	Água Doce	0.698	0.724	0.820	0.574
237	Major Gercino	0.698	0.738	0.818	0.563
237	Santa Cecília	0.698	0.697	0.819	0.597
240	Canelinha	0.697	0.723	0.865	0.542
240	Rio das Antas	0.697	0.727	0.820	0.569
242	Abelardo Luz	0.696	0.684	0.852	0.578
242	Bom Jardim da Serra	0.696	0.710	0.835	0.568
242	Coronel Martins	0.696	0.678	0.816	0.609
245	Ouro Verde	0.695	0.696	0.790	0.611
245	São João do Sul	0.695	0.682	0.840	0.587
247	Abdon Batista	0.694	0.660	0.841	0.625
247	José Boiteux	0.694	0.689	0.841	0.578
247	Urubici	0.694	0.722	0.823	0.562
250	Ponte Serrada	0.693	0.690	0.790	0.610
251	Romelândia	0.692	0.738	0.800	0.561
252	Caxambu do Sul	0.691	0.725	0.870	0.523
253	Campo Erê	0.690	0.702	0.787	0.595
253	Major Vieira	0.690	0.653	0.817	0.617
255	Ponte Alta do Norte	0.689	0.661	0.819	0.605
256	Anita Garibaldi	0.688	0.667	0.826	0.592
257	Angelina	0.687	0.699	0.797	0.581
257	São Joaquim	0.687	0.705	0.817	0.562
259	Leoberto Leal	0.686	0.740	0.818	0.533
259	Vargeão	0.686	0.708	0.827	0.551
261	Frei Rogério	0.682	0.664	0.812	0.588
261	Santa Terezinha do Progresso	0.682	0.686	0.791	0.585
263	São Bernardino	0.677	0.653	0.822	0.577
264	Bela Vista do Toldo	0.675	0.624	0.826	0.598
264	Monte Castelo	0.675	0.641	0.826	0.581
266	Anitápolis	0.674	0.699	0.836	0.524
267	Ponte Alta	0.673	0.666	0.804	0.568
267	Vitor Meireles	0.673	0.694	0.841	0.522
269	Bandeirante	0.672	0.675	0.795	0.565
270	Palmeira	0.671	0.655	0.827	0.557
271	Santa Terezinha	0.669	0.637	0.817	0.575
272	Alfredo Wagner	0.668	0.702	0.882	0.481
273	Imaruí	0.667	0.670	0.834	0.530
274	São Cristóvão do Sul	0.665	0.667	0.812	0.543
275	Painel	0.664	0.668	0.808	0.543
276	Macieira	0.662	0.675	0.806	0.533
277	Brunópolis	0.661	0.646	0.819	0.545
278	Ipuaçu	0.660	0.674	0.790	0.540
279	Passos Maia	0.659	0.648	0.808	0.547
279	Timbó Grande	0.659	0.634	0.798	0.565
281	Entre Rios	0.657	0.638	0.808	0.550
281	Matos Costa	0.657	0.630	0.831	0.541
283	Capão Alto	0.654	0.680	0.796	0.516
283	Saltinho	0.654	0.639	0.795	0.551
285	Rio Rufino	0.653	0.652	0.806	0.530
286	Lebon Régis	0.649	0.632	0.806	0.537
287	Bocaina do Sul	0.647	0.642	0.768	0.549
288	Monte Carlo	0.643	0.648	0.804	0.511
289	Campo Belo do Sul	0.641	0.648	0.768	0.528
290	São José do Cerrito	0.636	0.618	0.827	0.503
291	Vargem	0.629	0.636	0.790	0.495
292	Calmon	0.622	0.618	0.779	0.500
293	Cerro Negro	0.621	0.634	0.829	0.455
Low HDI
no municipality
Very low HDI
no municipality

== See also ==
- Geography of Brazil
- List of cities in Brazil
