= Imbuia =

Imbuia may refer to:

- Ocotea porosa, a species of tree belonging to the laurel family
- Imbuia, Santa Catarina, a Brazilian municipality in the state of Santa Catarina
