= Monte Castelo, Santa Catarina =

Coordinates: 26°27′43″S 50°13′51″W

Monte Castelo
- Municipality
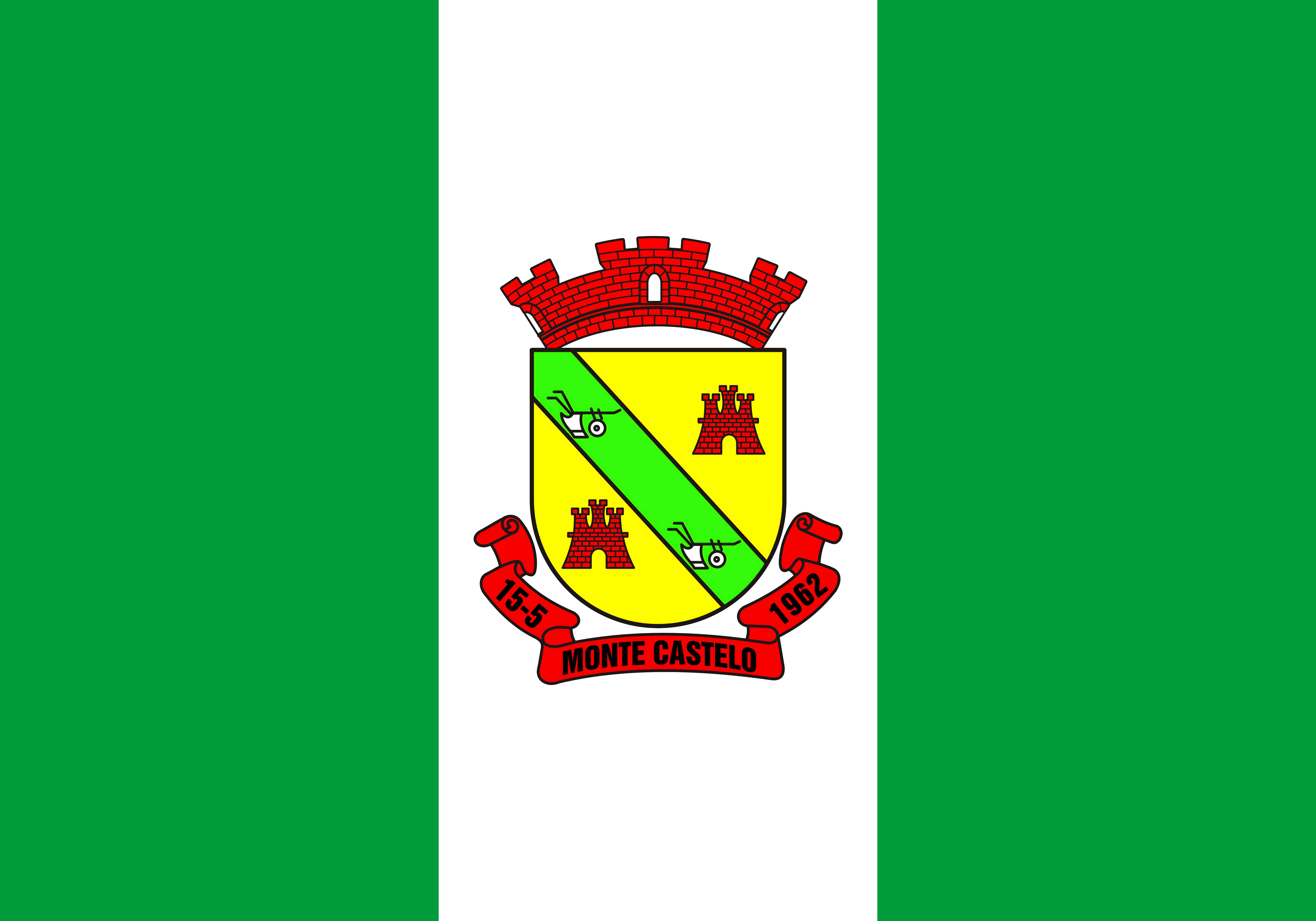
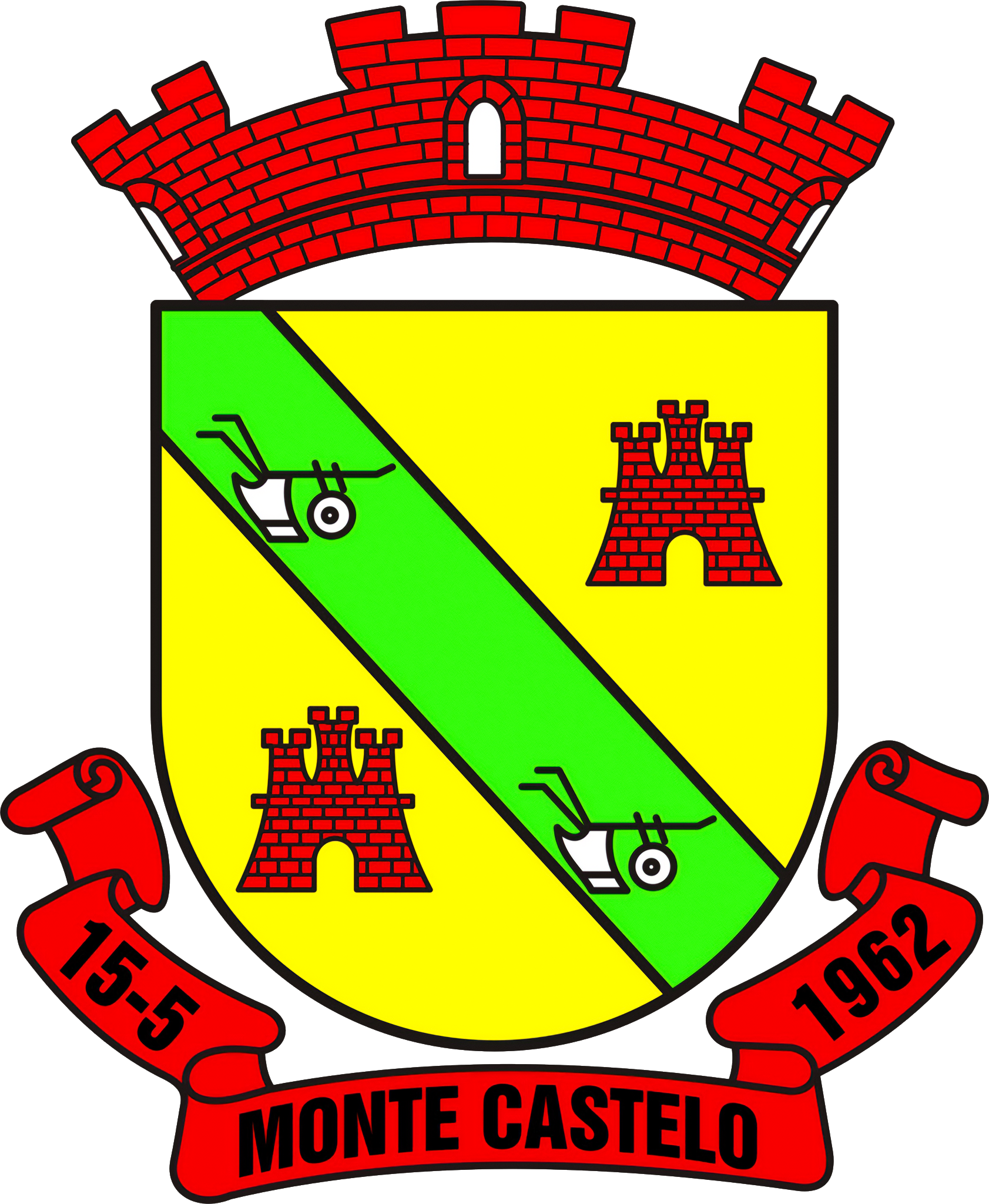
- Flag Coat of arms
- Interactive map of Monte Castelo
- Country: Brazil
- Region: South
- Mesoregion: Norte Catarinense

Population (2020)
  - Total: 8,269
- Time zone: UTC -3
- Postal code: 89380-000
- Website: www.montecastelo.sc.gov.br

Monte Castelo is a municipality in Santa Catarina in the South region of Brazil.

== See also ==
- List of municipalities in Santa Catarina
