= Santa Rosa do Sul =

Coordinates: 29.1361°S 49.7°W

- Municipality
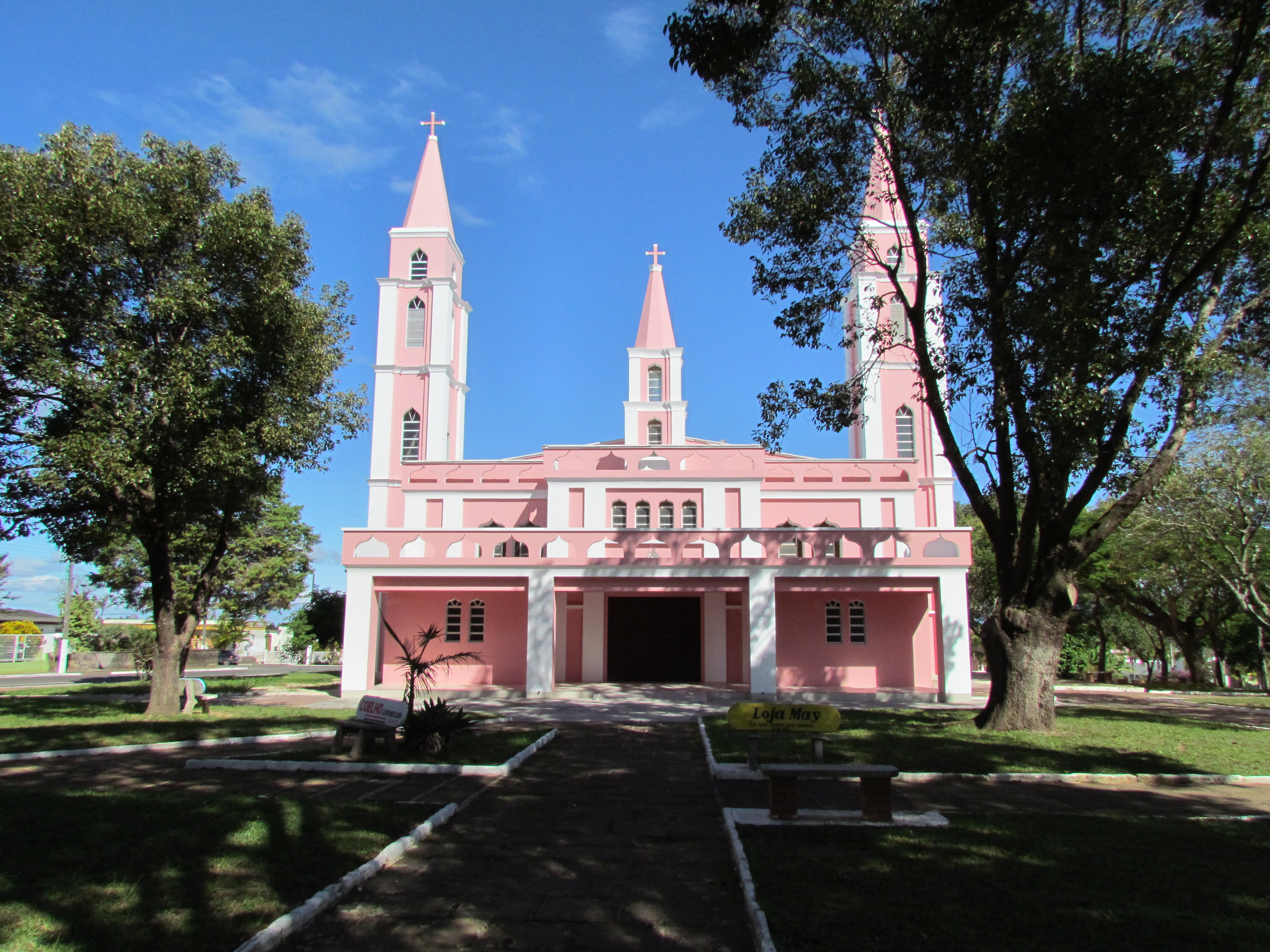

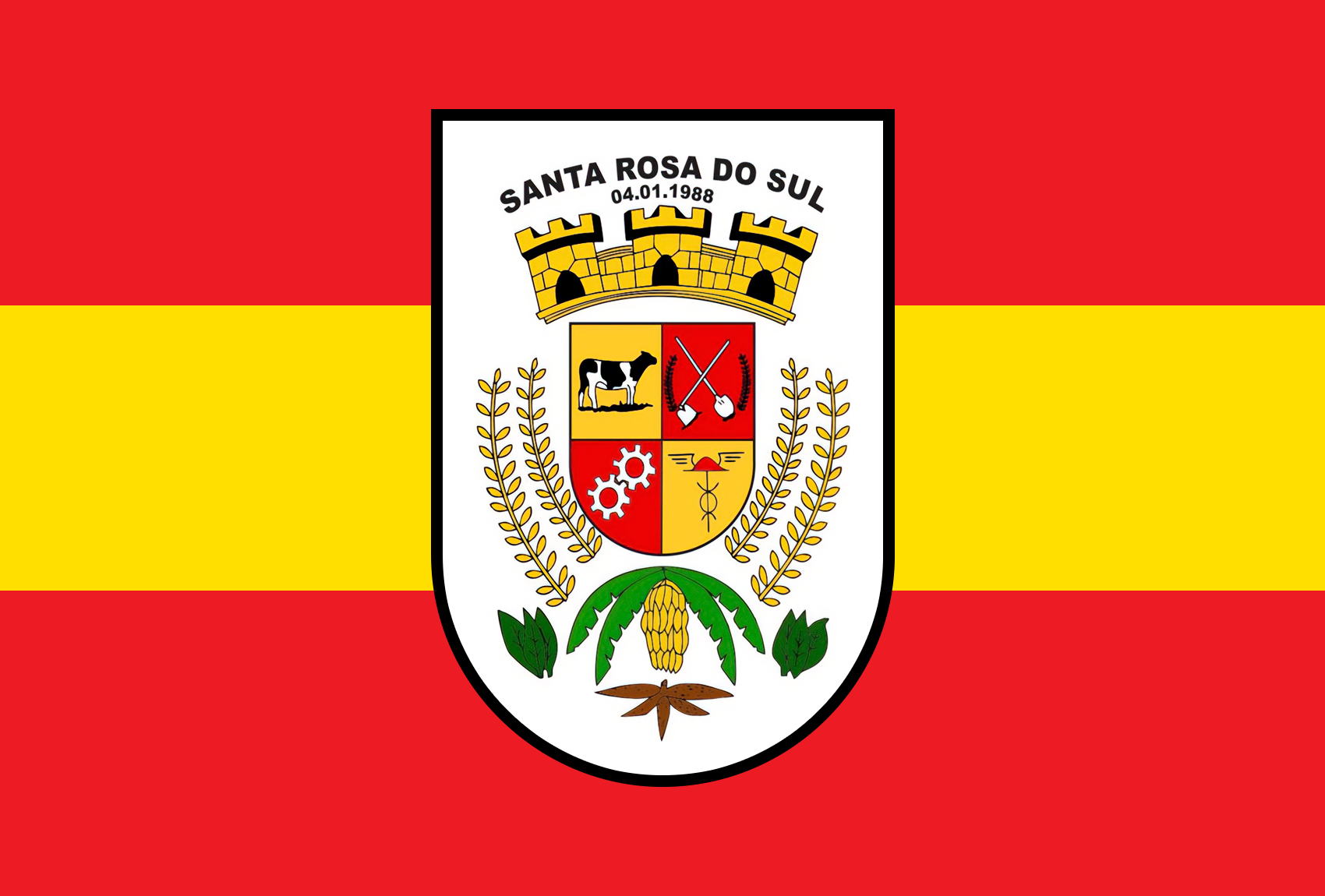
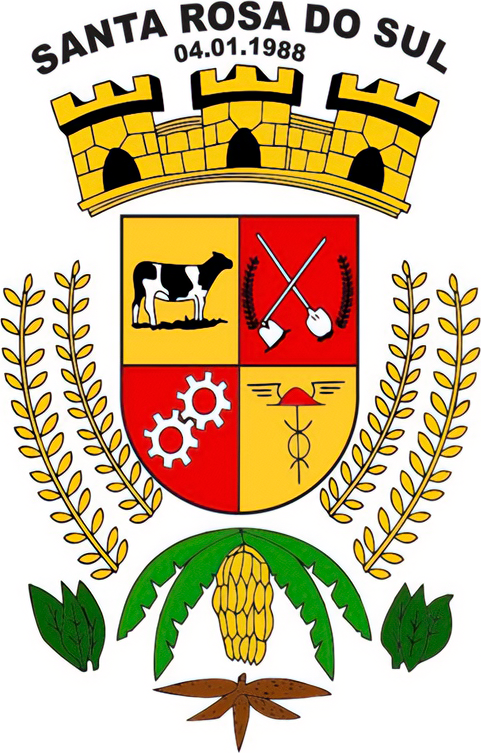
- Flag Coat of arms
- Interactive map of Santa Rosa do Sul
- Country: Brazil
- Region: South
- State: Santa Catarina
- Mesoregion: Sul Catarinense

Population (2020)
  - Total: 8,378
- Time zone: UTC -3
- Website: www.santarosadosul.sc.gov.br

Santa Rosa do Sul is a municipality in the state of Santa Catarina in the South region of Brazil.

== See also ==
- List of municipalities in Santa Catarina
