= Lindóia do Sul =

Coordinates: 27.0533°S 52.0667°W

- Municipality
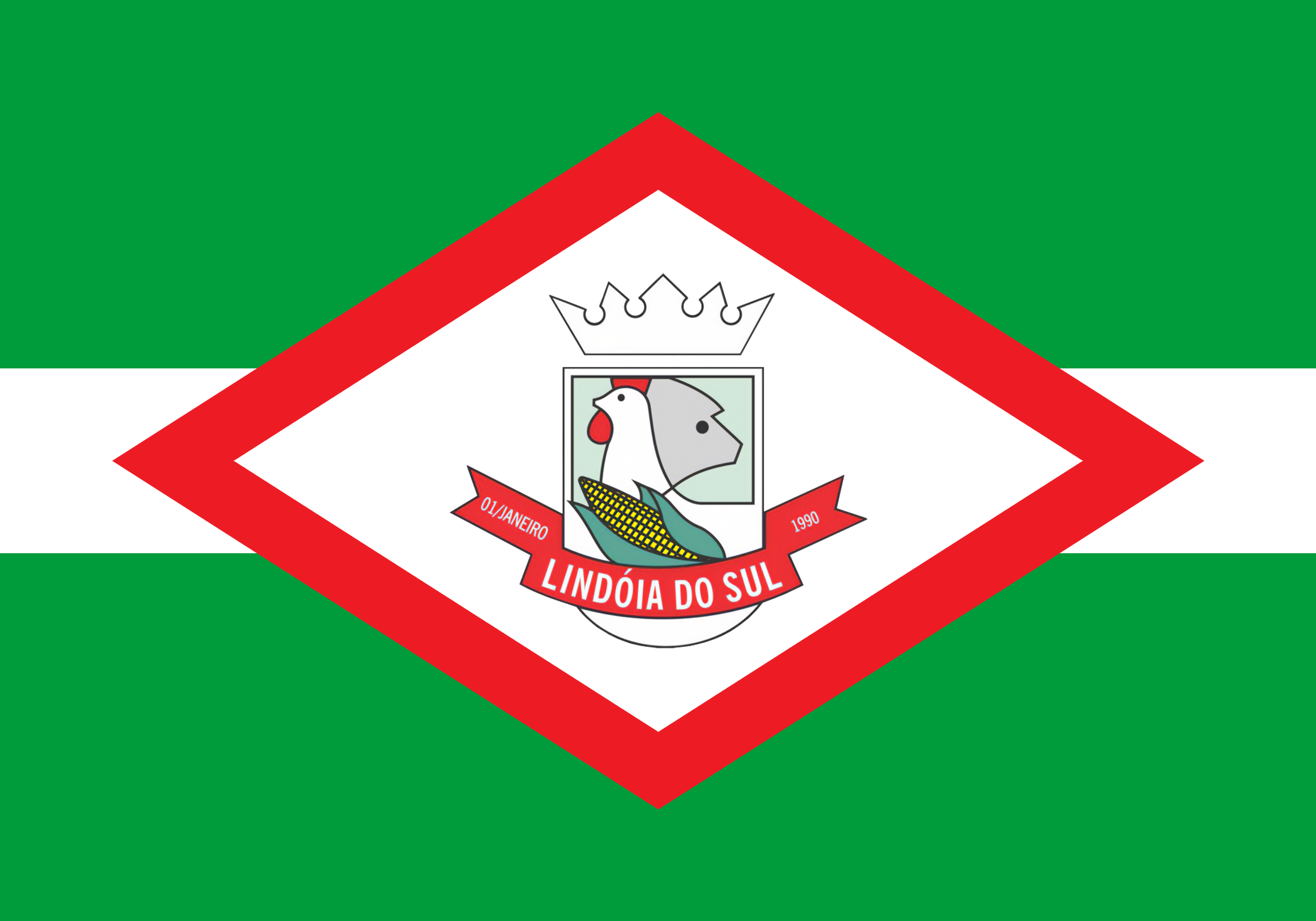
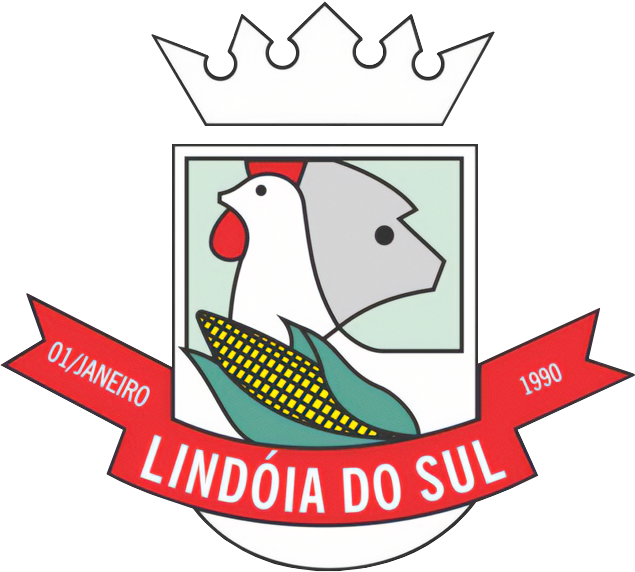
- Flag Coat of arms
- Interactive map of Lindóia do Sul
- Country: Brazil
- Region: South
- State: Santa Catarina
- Mesoregion: Oeste Catarinense

Population (2020)
  - Total: 4,546
- Time zone: UTC -3
- Website: www.lindoiadosul.sc.gov.br

Lindóia do Sul is a municipality in the state of Santa Catarina in the South region of Brazil.

== See also ==
- List of municipalities in Santa Catarina
