= Palmeira, Santa Catarina =

Coordinates: 27°34′58″S 50°09′32″W

- Municipality
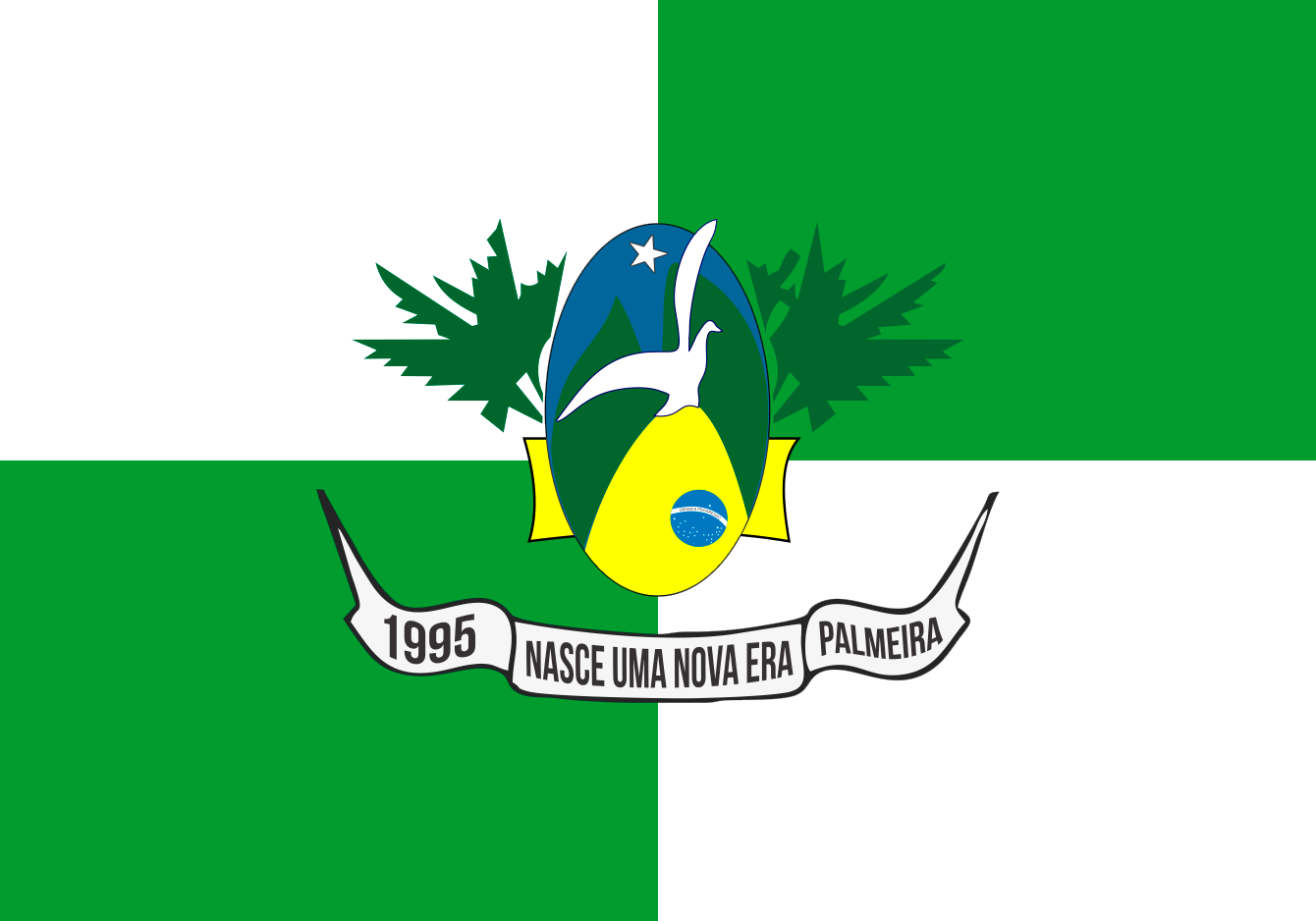
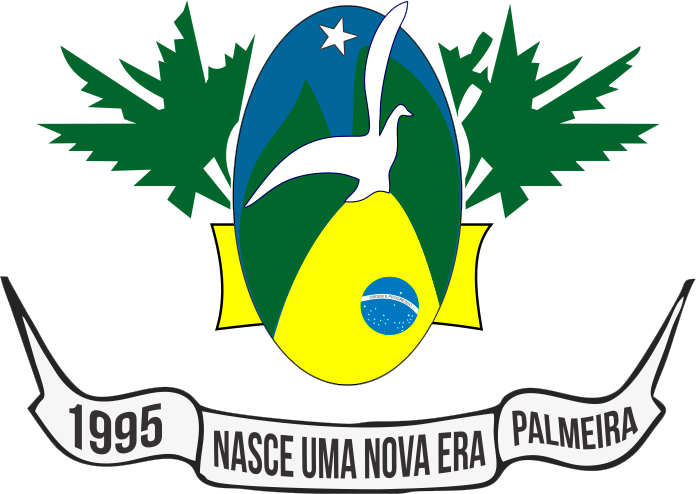
- Flag Coat of arms
- Interactive map of Palmeira, Santa Catarina
- Country: Brazil
- Region: South
- State: Santa Catarina
- Mesoregion: Serrana

Population (2020)
  - Total: 2,650
- Time zone: UTC -3
- Website: www.palmeira.sc.gov.br

Palmeira, Santa Catarina is a municipality in the state of Santa Catarina in the South region of Brazil.

== See also ==
- List of municipalities in Santa Catarina
