= Cunhataí =

- Municipality
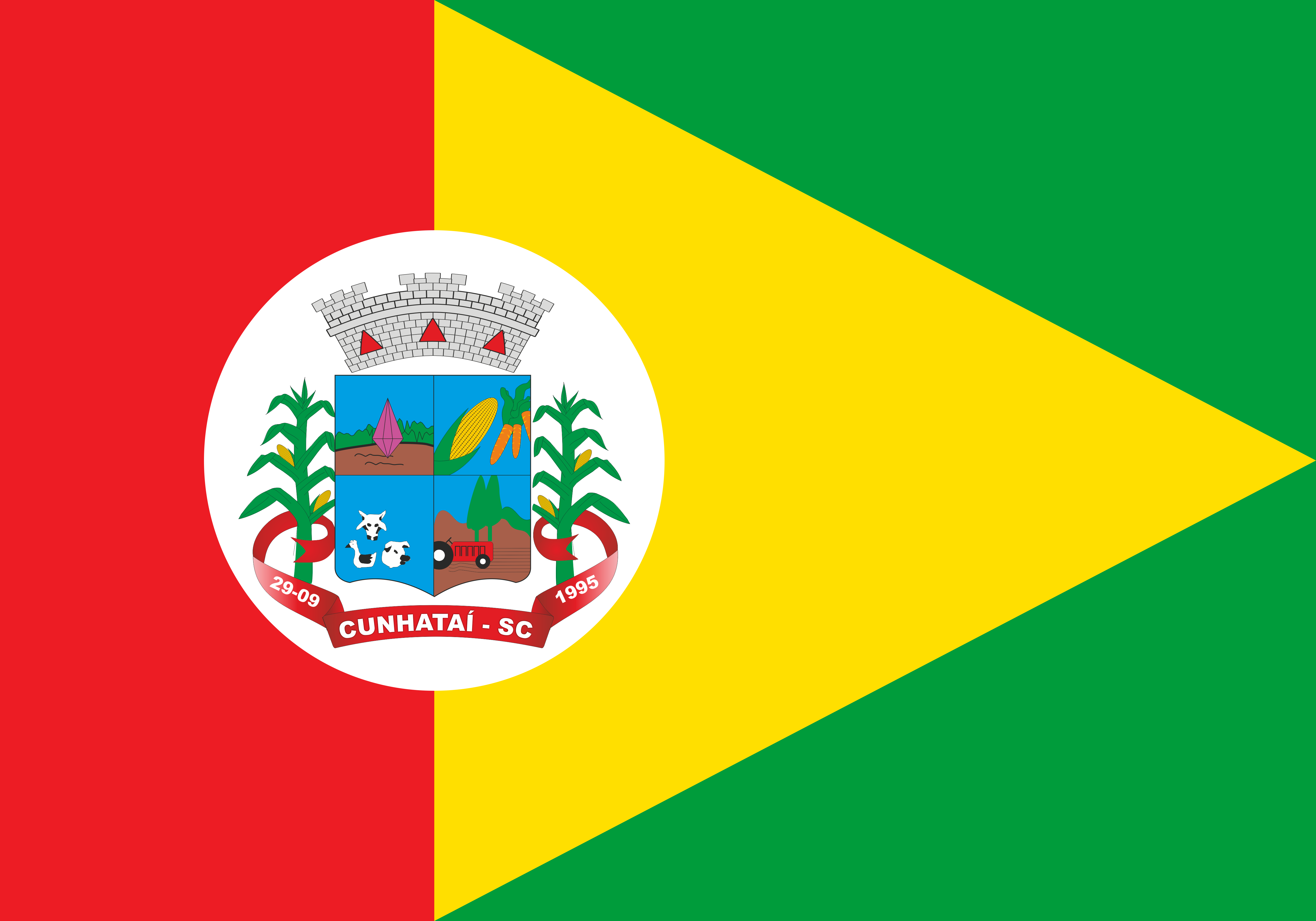
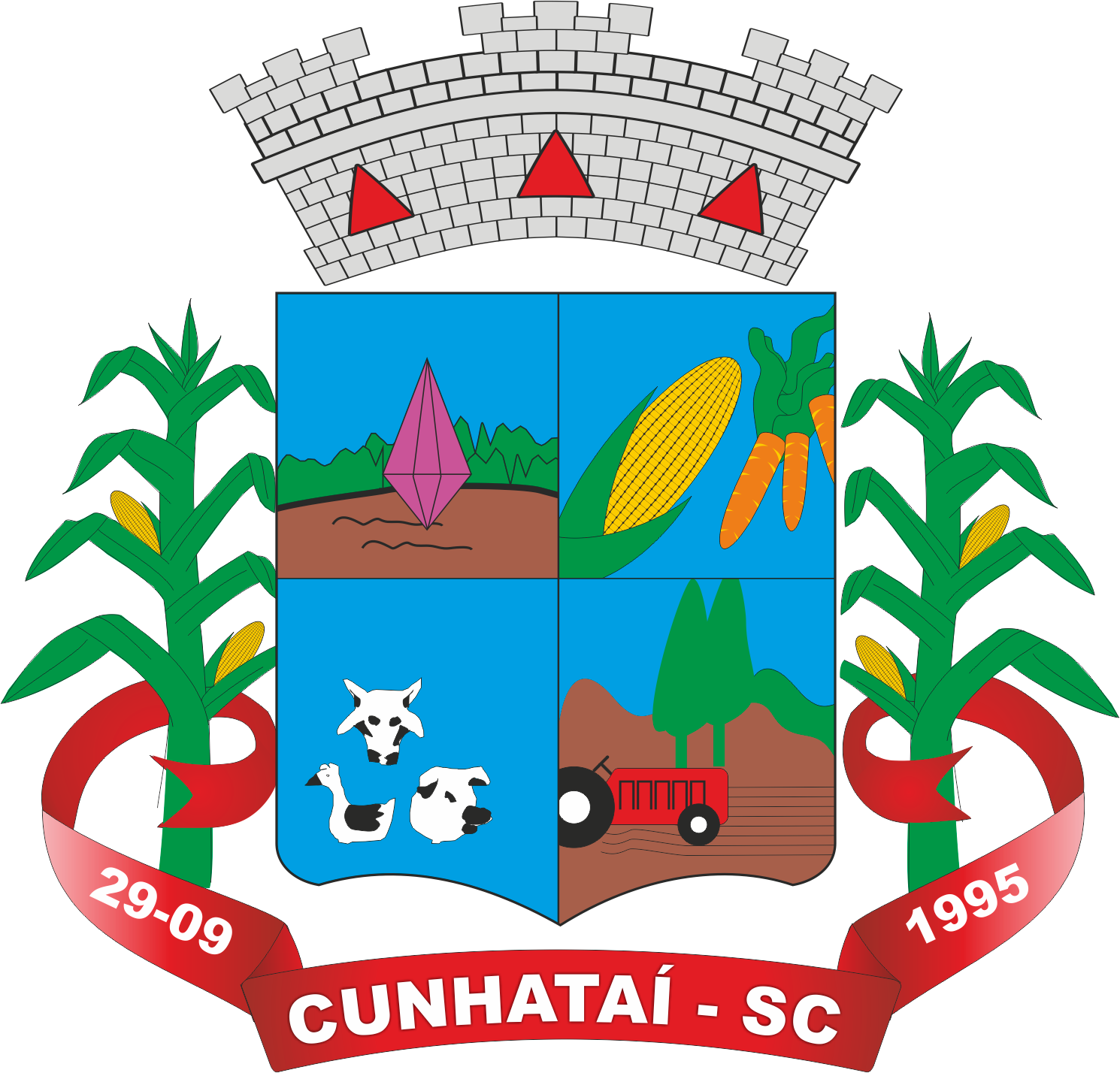
- Flag Coat of arms

- Location in Brazil
- Coordinates: 26.9689°S 53.0928°W
- Country: Brazil
- Region: South
- State: Santa Catarina
- Mesoregion: Oeste Catarinense

Population (2020)
  - Total: 1,967
- Time zone: UTC -3
- Website: www.cunhatai.sc.gov.br

Cunhataí is a municipality in the state of Santa Catarina in the South region of Brazil.

== See also ==
- List of municipalities in Santa Catarina
