= Major Vieira =

- Municipality
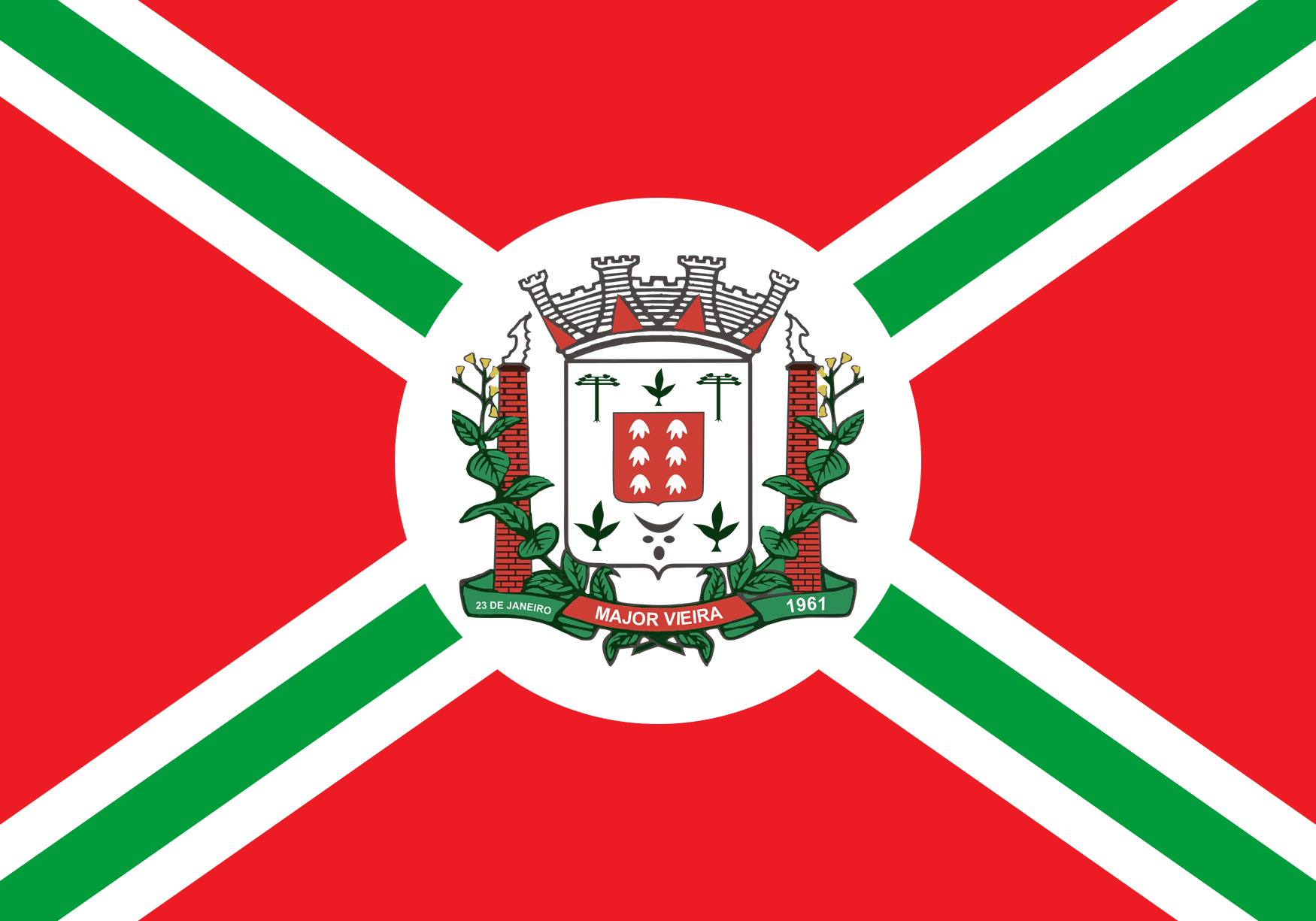
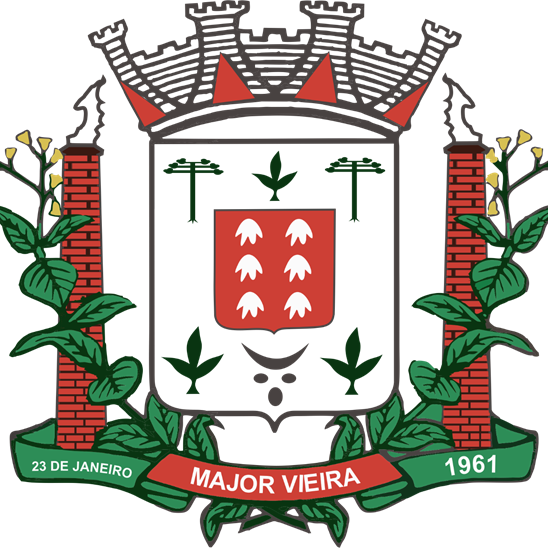
- Flag Coat of arms

- Location in Brazil
- Coordinates: 26°22′4″S 50°19′40″W
- Country: Brazil
- Region: South
- State: Santa Catarina
- Mesoregion: Norte Catarinense

Population (2020)
  - Total: 8,156
- Time zone: UTC -3
- Website: www.majorvieira.sc.gov.br

Major Vieira is a municipality in the state of Santa Catarina in the South region of Brazil.

== Climate ==
Climate data for Major Vieira, elevation 765 m (2,510 ft), (1976–2005)
Month	Jan	Feb	Mar	Apr	May	Jun	Jul	Aug	Sep	Oct	Nov	Dec	Year
Record high °C (°F)	34.0 (93.2)	33.2 (91.8)	32.4 (90.3)	30.3 (86.5)	27.6 (81.7)	28.4 (83.1)	28.6 (83.5)	32.0 (89.6)	33.8 (92.8)	32.2 (90.0)	34.0 (93.2)	33.6 (92.5)	34.0 (93.2)
Mean daily maximum °C (°F)	27.5 (81.5)	26.9 (80.4)	26.1 (79.0)	24.1 (75.4)	19.8 (67.6)	18.5 (65.3)	18.4 (65.1)	20.3 (68.5)	20.8 (69.4)	22.5 (72.5)	25.6 (78.1)	27.0 (80.6)	23.1 (73.6)
Daily mean °C (°F)	21.3 (70.3)	21.2 (70.2)	20.0 (68.0)	17.5 (63.5)	13.5 (56.3)	12.2 (54.0)	11.4 (52.5)	13.1 (55.6)	14.9 (58.8)	16.8 (62.2)	19.3 (66.7)	21.1 (70.0)	16.9 (62.3)
Mean daily minimum °C (°F)	17.1 (62.8)	15.6 (60.1)	15.6 (60.1)	12.9 (55.2)	8.6 (47.5)	7.2 (45.0)	6.2 (43.2)	7.6 (45.7)	10.4 (50.7)	12.8 (55.0)	13.8 (56.8)	16.5 (61.7)	12.0 (53.7)
Record low °C (°F)	6.2 (43.2)	8.0 (46.4)	3.2 (37.8)	−0.6 (30.9)	−4.1 (24.6)	−5.0 (23.0)	−6.4 (20.5)	−7.0 (19.4)	−1.8 (28.8)	2.2 (36.0)	4.8 (40.6)	7.5 (45.5)	−7.0 (19.4)
Average precipitation mm (inches)	203.0 (7.99)	169.0 (6.65)	122.0 (4.80)	82.0 (3.23)	105.0 (4.13)	114.0 (4.49)	94.0 (3.70)	89.0 (3.50)	162.0 (6.38)	176.0 (6.93)	134.0 (5.28)	153.0 (6.02)	1,603 (63.1)
Average relative humidity (%)	82	82	83	82	83	86	85	82	80	82	80	79	82
Mean monthly sunshine hours	149	131	142	138	135	118	144	155	115	134	170	172	1,703
Source 1: Empresa Brasileira de Pesquisa Agropecuária (EMBRAPA)
Source 2: Climatempo (precipitation)

== See also ==
- List of municipalities in Santa Catarina
