= Paial =

Coordinates: 27.2522°S 52.4981°W

- Municipality
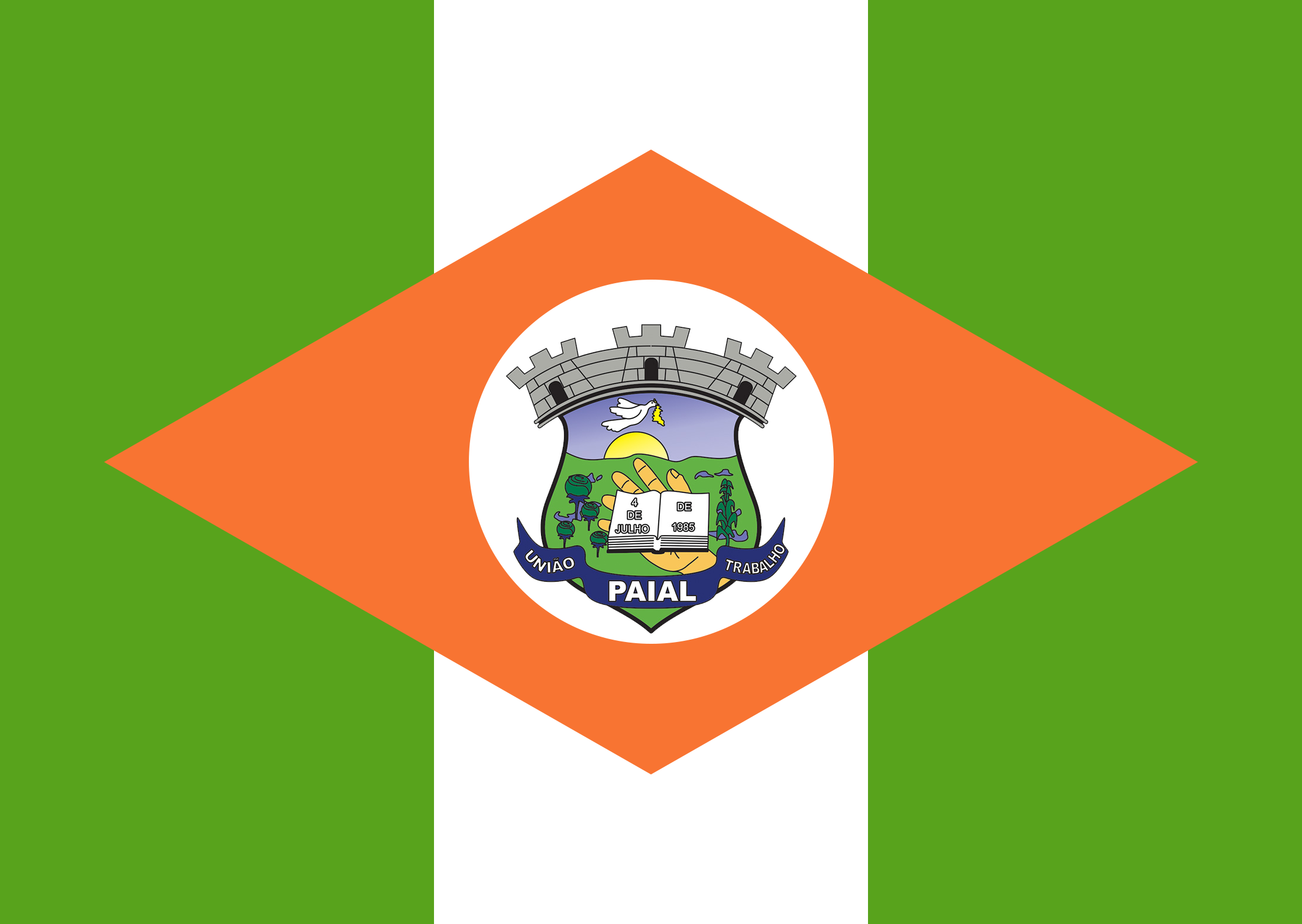
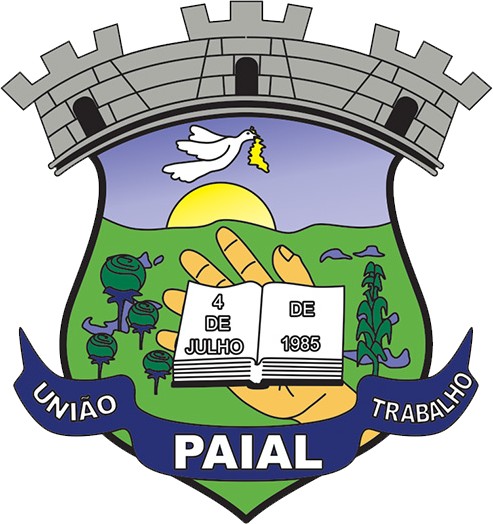
- Flag Coat of arms
- Interactive map of Paial
- Country: Brazil
- Region: South
- State: Santa Catarina
- Mesoregion: Oeste Catarinense

Population (2020)
  - Total: 1,474
- Time zone: UTC -3
- Website: www.paial.sc.gov.br

Paial is a municipality in the state of Santa Catarina in the South region of Brazil.

== See also ==
- List of municipalities in Santa Catarina
