= Brunópolis =

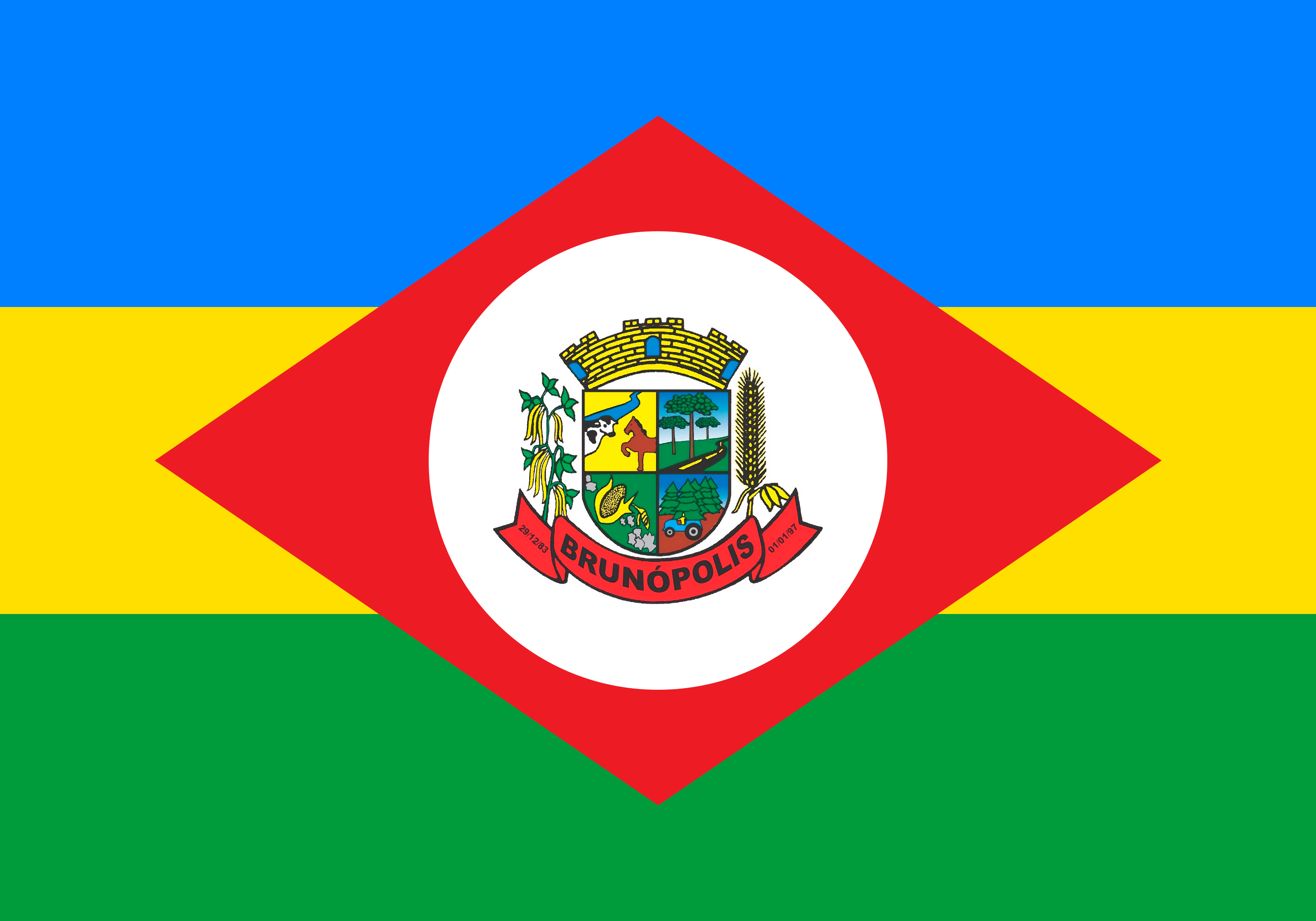
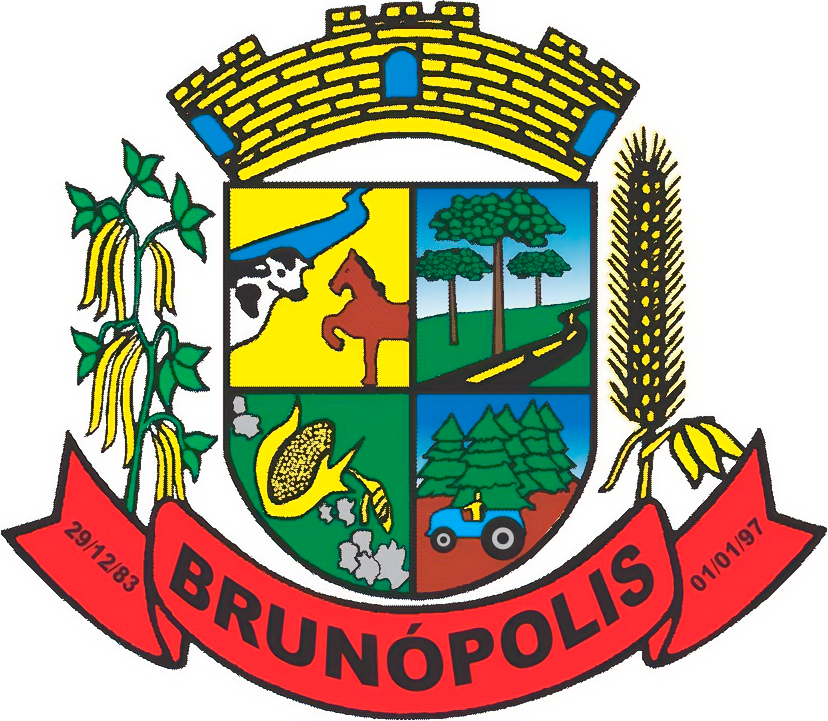
- Flag Coat of arms

- Location of Brunópolis

- Location within Brazil
- Coordinates: 27°18′21″S 50°52′04″W
- Country: Brazil
- Region: South
- State: (Santa Catarina (state)) Santa Catarina
- Founded: January 1, 1997

Government
  - Mayor: Volcir Canuto (PMDB)

Area
  - Total: 336 km^{2} (130 sq mi)
- Elevation: 843 m (2,766 ft)

Population (2020)
  - Total: 2,368
  - Density: 8.7/km^{2} (23/sq mi)
- Time zone: UTC-3 (UTC-3)
  - Summer (DST): UTC-2 (UTC-2)
- HDI (2000): 0.742
- Website: www.brunopolis.sc.gov.br

Brunópolis is a city in Santa Catarina, in the Southern Region of Brazil.
