= Santa Terezinha do Progresso =

Coordinates: 26.6189°S 53.2017°W

- Municipality
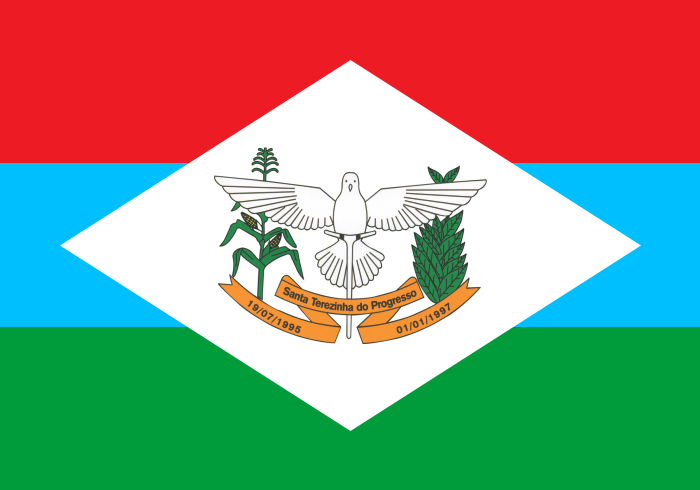
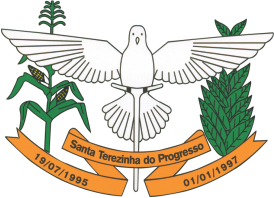
- Flag Coat of arms
- Interactive map of Santa Terezinha do Progresso
- Country: Brazil
- Region: South
- State: Santa Catarina
- Mesoregion: Oeste Catarinense

Population (2020)
  - Total: 2,372
- Time zone: UTC -3
- Website: staterezinhaprogresso.sc.gov.br

Santa Terezinha do Progresso is a municipality in the state of Santa Catarina in the South region of Brazil.

== See also ==
- List of municipalities in Santa Catarina
