= Morro Grande =

Coordinates: 28.8006°S 49.7208°W

- Municipality
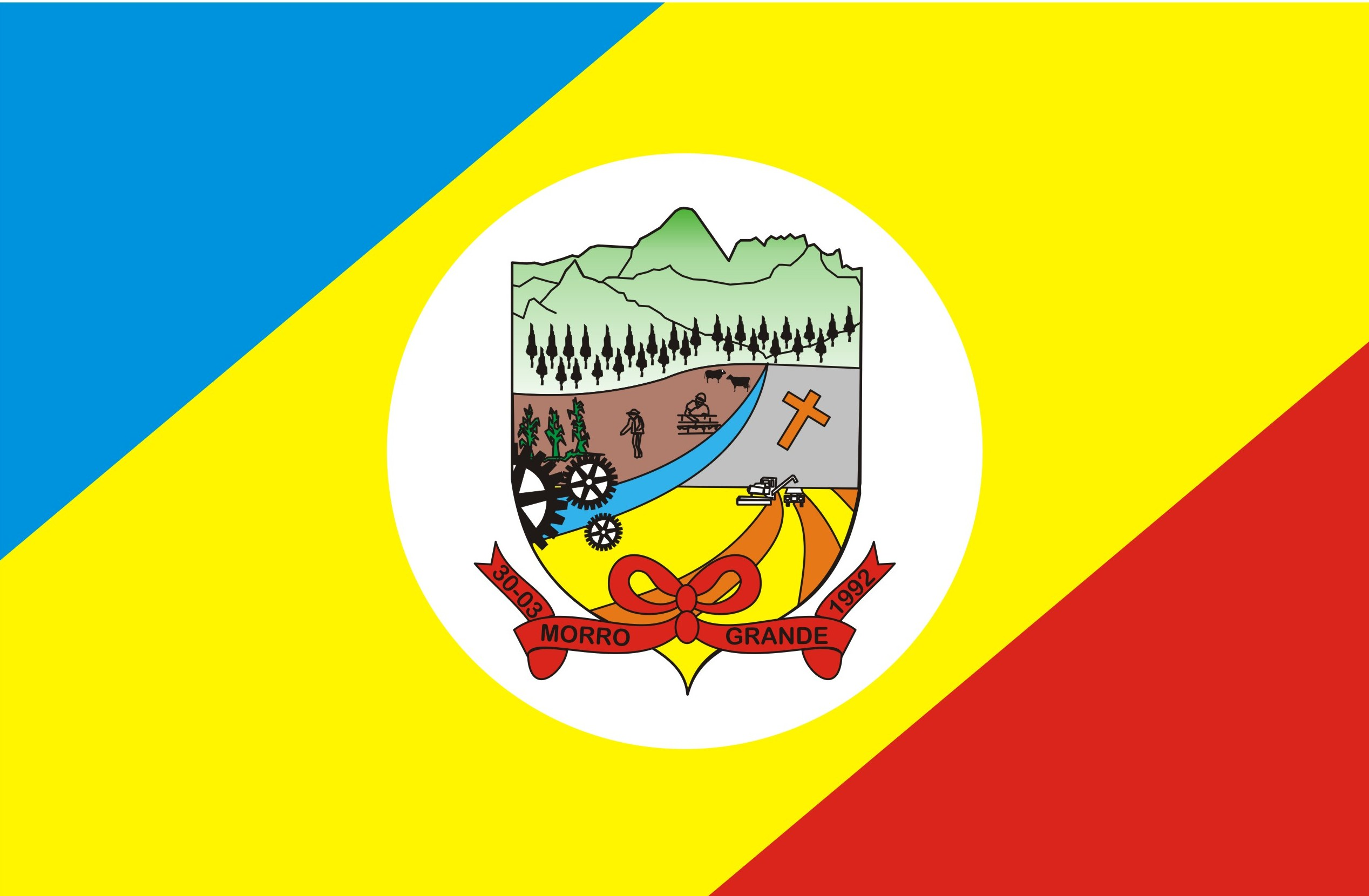
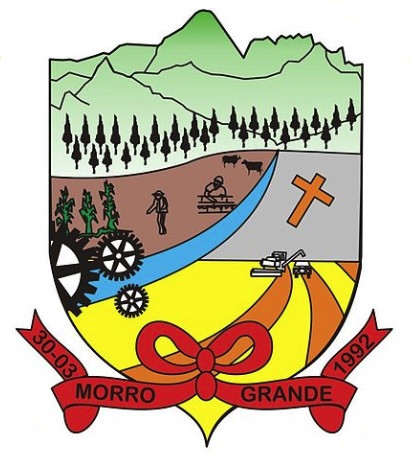
- Flag Coat of arms
- Interactive map of Morro Grande
- Country: Brazil
- Region: South
- State: Santa Catarina
- Mesoregion: Sul Catarinense

Population (2020)
  - Total: 2,888
- Time zone: UTC -3

Morro Grande is a municipality in the state of Santa Catarina in the South region of Brazil.

== See also ==
- List of municipalities in Santa Catarina
