= Flor do Sertão =

- Municipality
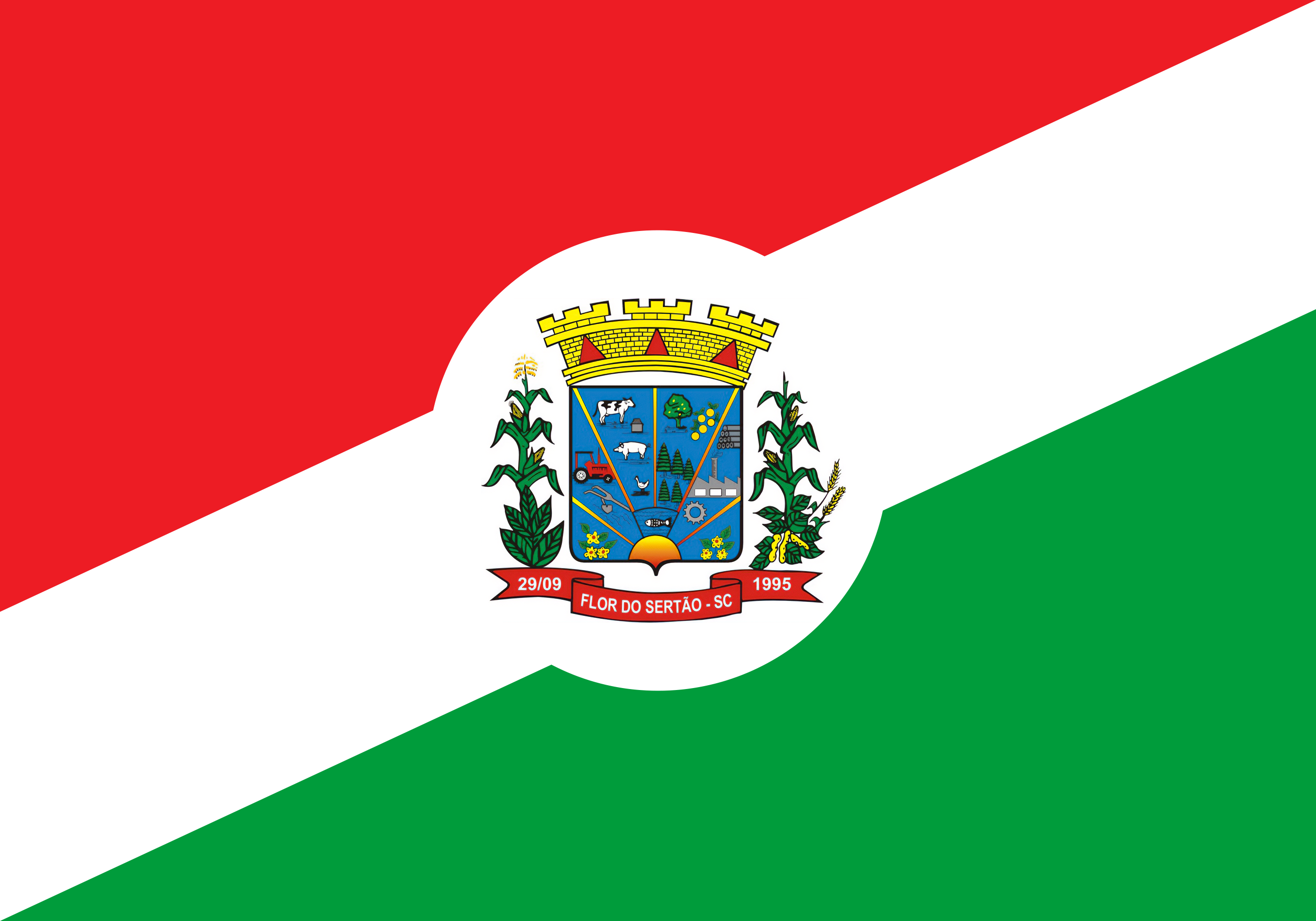
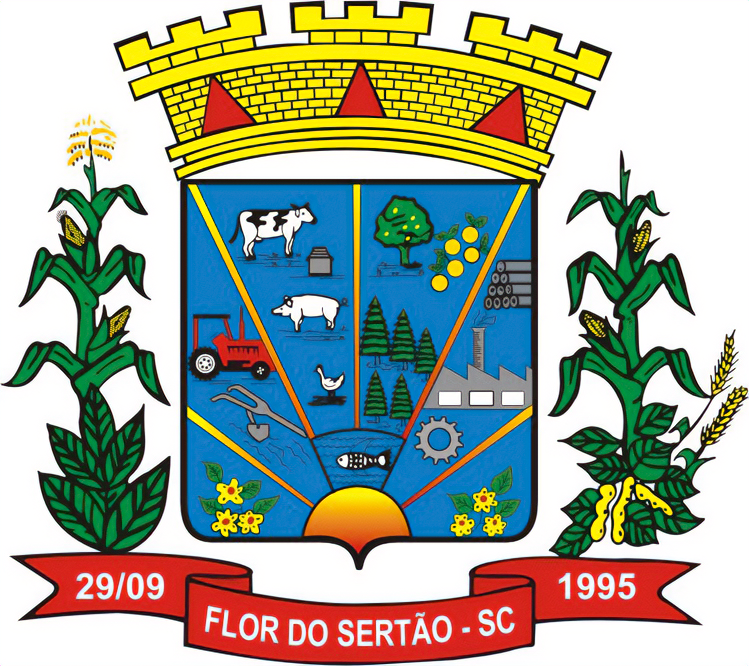
- Flag Coat of arms

- Location in Brazil
- Coordinates: 26.7778°S 53.3469°W
- Country: Brazil
- Region: South
- State: Santa Catarina
- Mesoregion: Oeste Catarinense

Population (2022)
  - Total: 1,783
- Time zone: UTC -3
- Website: www.flordosertao.sc.gov.br

Flor do Sertão is a Brazilian municipality in the state of Santa Catarina. It is located at a latitude of 26º46'39" south and a longitude of 53º20'51" west, at an altitude of 302 meters. It is the third least populous municipality in Santa Catarina.

== History ==
The name Flor do Sertão (Flower of the Sertão), according to the oldest residents, comes from a tree with yellow flowers found in the middle of the forest at the beginning of colonization, which they believed to be the Yellow Ipê, a tree that became a symbol of the municipality.

== Infrastructure of the municipality ==
In the territory of Flor do Sertão, lies the Flor do Sertão Small Hydroelectric Power Plant (PCH), built on the Antas River, a tributary of the Uruguay River basin. The project is the result of an inter-cooperation project between eight cooperatives from Santa Catarina that joined together to form the company Mauê S/A: Aurora Coop (Chapecó), Cooperalfa (Chapecó), Ceraçá (Saudades), Cooper A-1 (Palmitos), Cooperitaipu (Pinhalzinho), Copérdia (Concórdia), Coopercampos (Campos Novos) and Auriverde (Cunha Porã).

== See also ==
- List of municipalities in Santa Catarina
