= Matos Costa =

Coordinates: 26°27′S 51°09′W

- Municipality
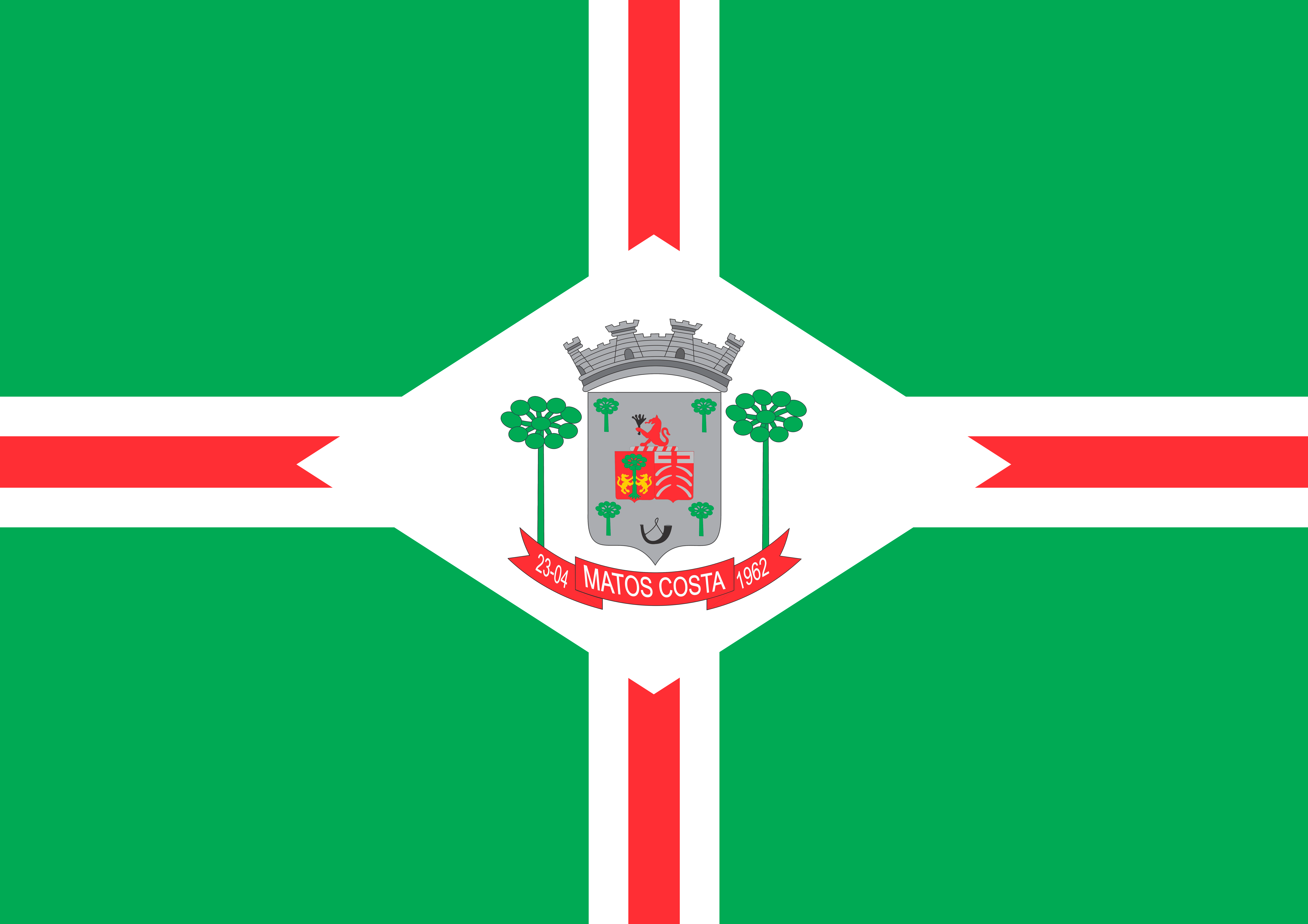
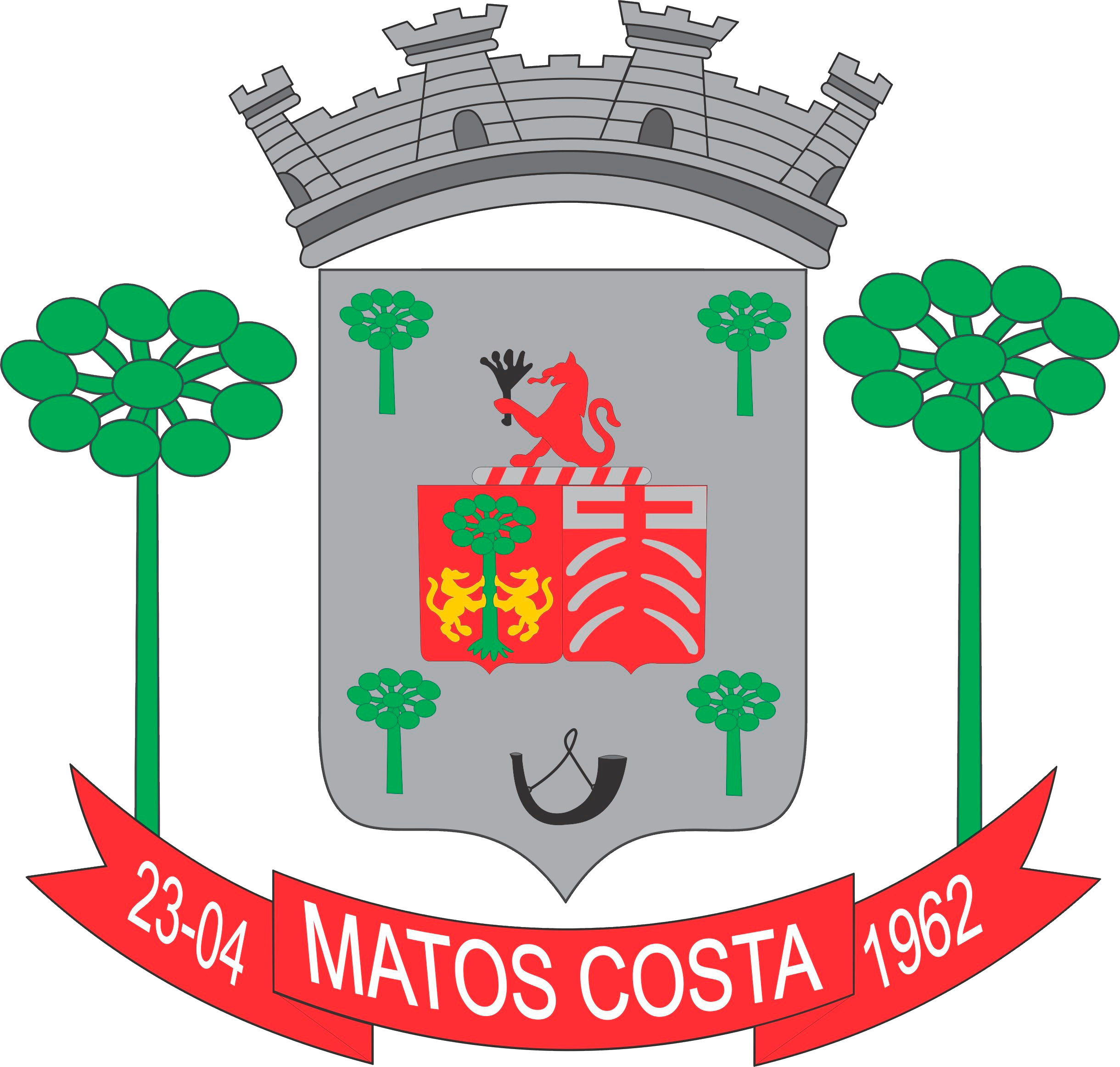
- Flag Coat of arms
- Interactive map of Matos Costa
- Country: Brazil
- Region: South
- State: Santa Catarina
- Mesoregion: Oeste Catarinense

Population (2020)
  - Total: 2,480
- Time zone: UTC -3

Matos Costa is a municipality in the state of Santa Catarina in the South region of Brazil.

== Climate ==
Climate data for Matos Costa, elevation 1,200 m (3,900 ft), (1976–2005)
Month	Jan	Feb	Mar	Apr	May	Jun	Jul	Aug	Sep	Oct	Nov	Dec	Year
Record high °C (°F)	29.0 (84.2)	29.0 (84.2)	29.4 (84.9)	27.4 (81.3)	25.4 (77.7)	23.4 (74.1)	25.0 (77.0)	28.8 (83.8)	29.4 (84.9)	29.4 (84.9)	30.2 (86.4)	30.6 (87.1)	30.6 (87.1)
Mean daily maximum °C (°F)	24.8 (76.6)	24.4 (75.9)	23.1 (73.6)	20.8 (69.4)	18.1 (64.6)	16.2 (61.2)	16.4 (61.5)	18.1 (64.6)	18.5 (65.3)	20.1 (68.2)	22.9 (73.2)	24.8 (76.6)	20.7 (69.2)
Daily mean °C (°F)	19.5 (67.1)	19.2 (66.6)	17.6 (63.7)	15.4 (59.7)	12.9 (55.2)	11.2 (52.2)	11.4 (52.5)	12.5 (54.5)	13.6 (56.5)	15.0 (59.0)	17.2 (63.0)	19.1 (66.4)	15.4 (59.7)
Mean daily minimum °C (°F)	14.8 (58.6)	15.0 (59.0)	13.5 (56.3)	11.4 (52.5)	9.1 (48.4)	7.4 (45.3)	7.2 (45.0)	7.6 (45.7)	9.1 (48.4)	11.3 (52.3)	12.1 (53.8)	13.6 (56.5)	11.0 (51.8)
Record low °C (°F)	8.0 (46.4)	9.6 (49.3)	3.2 (37.8)	−3.2 (26.2)	−0.8 (30.6)	−5.0 (23.0)	−5.6 (21.9)	−8.0 (17.6)	1.0 (33.8)	3.6 (38.5)	2.4 (36.3)	5.0 (41.0)	−8.0 (17.6)
Average precipitation mm (inches)	122.1 (4.81)	150.4 (5.92)	138.2 (5.44)	98.4 (3.87)	132.7 (5.22)	114.1 (4.49)	109.0 (4.29)	114.3 (4.50)	123.1 (4.85)	154.7 (6.09)	144.0 (5.67)	160.5 (6.32)	1,561.5 (61.47)
Average relative humidity (%)	82	86	86	85	86	86	83	78	82	84	76	77	83
Source: Empresa Brasileira de Pesquisa Agropecuária (EMBRAPA)

== See also ==
- List of municipalities in Santa Catarina
