= Princesa, Santa Catarina =

Coordinates: 26°26′31″S 53°35′52″W

- Municipality
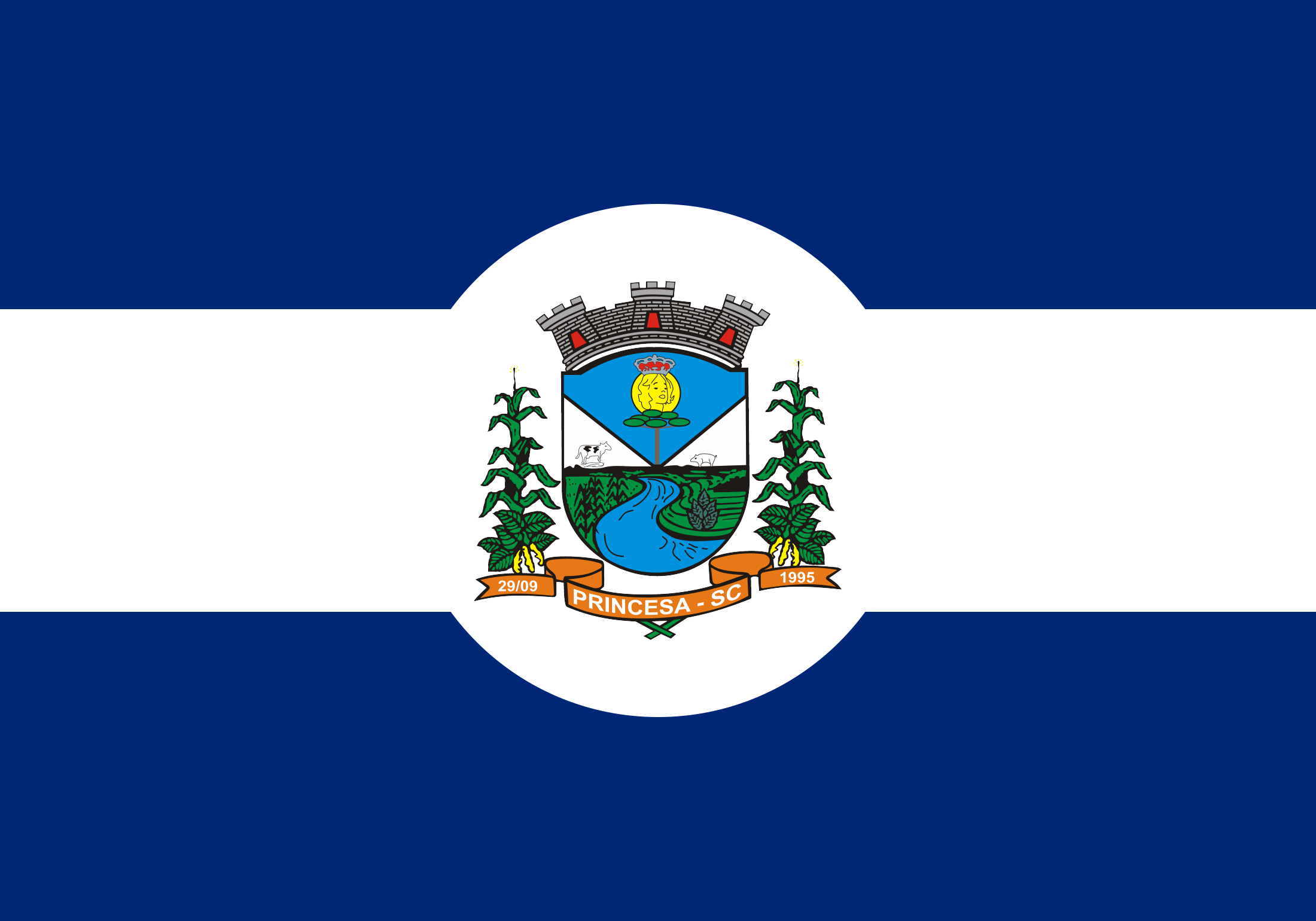
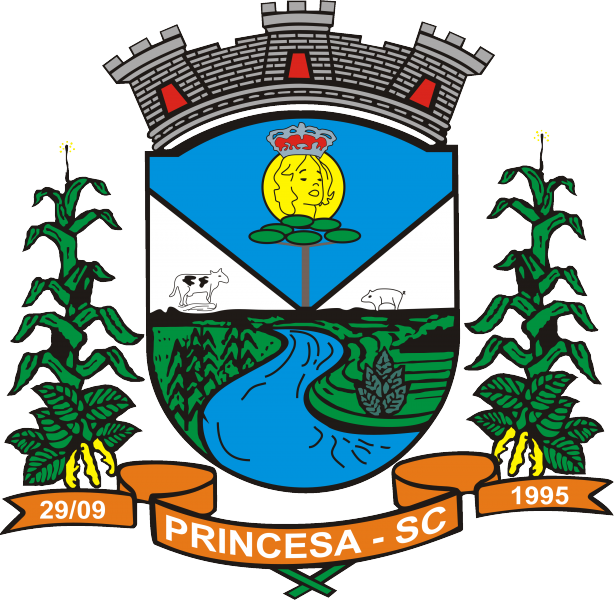
- Flag Coat of arms
- Interactive map of Princesa, Santa Catarina
- Country: Brazil
- Region: South
- State: Santa Catarina
- Mesoregion: Oeste Catarinense

Population (2020)
  - Total: 2,937
- Time zone: UTC -3
- Website: www.princesa.sc.gov.br

Princesa, Santa Catarina is a municipality in the state of Santa Catarina in the South region of Brazil.

== See also ==
- List of municipalities in Santa Catarina
