= Pinheiro Preto =

- Municipality
- Flag Coat of arms

- Location in Brazil
- Coordinates: 27°02′44″S 51°13′45″W
- Country: Brazil
- Region: South
- State: Santa Catarina
- Mesoregion: Oeste Catarinense

Population (2020)
  - Total: 3,596
- Time zone: UTC -3
- Website: www.pinheiropreto.sc.gov.br

Pinheiro Preto is a municipality in the state of Santa Catarina in the South region of Brazil.

== See also ==
- List of municipalities in Santa Catarina
