= União do Oeste =

- Municipality
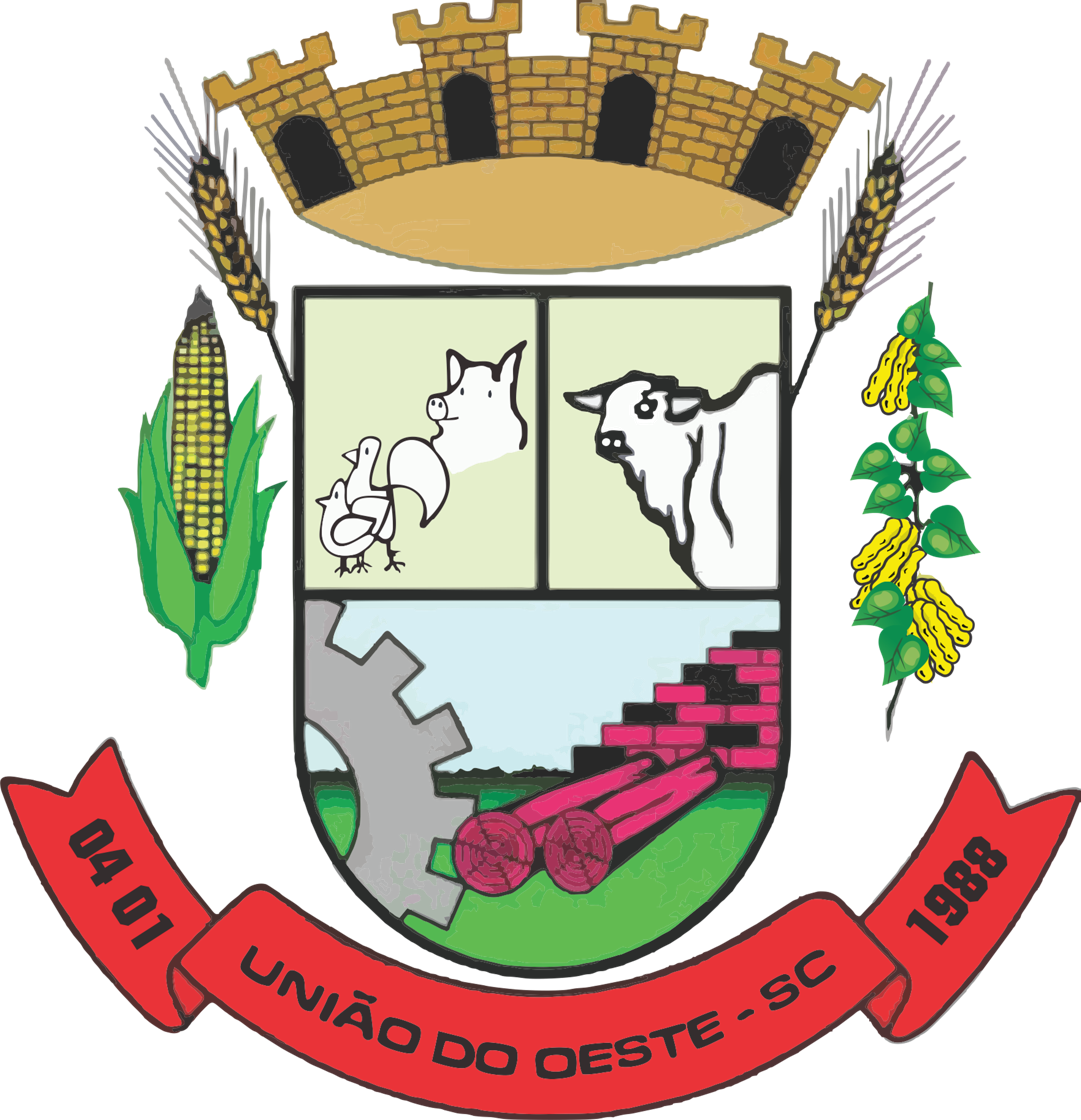
- Flag Coat of arms

- Location in Brazil
- Coordinates: 26°47′S 52°51′W
- Country: Brazil
- Region: South
- State: Santa Catarina
- Mesoregion: Oeste Catarinense

Population (2020)
  - Total: 2,412
- Time zone: UTC -3
- Website: www.uniaodooeste.sc.gov.br

União do Oeste is a municipality in the state of Santa Catarina in the South region of Brazil. It was created in 1988 by division of the municipality of Coronel Freitas.

== See also ==
- List of municipalities in Santa Catarina
