= São Miguel da Boa Vista =

Coordinates: 26.6903°S 53.2514°W

- Municipality
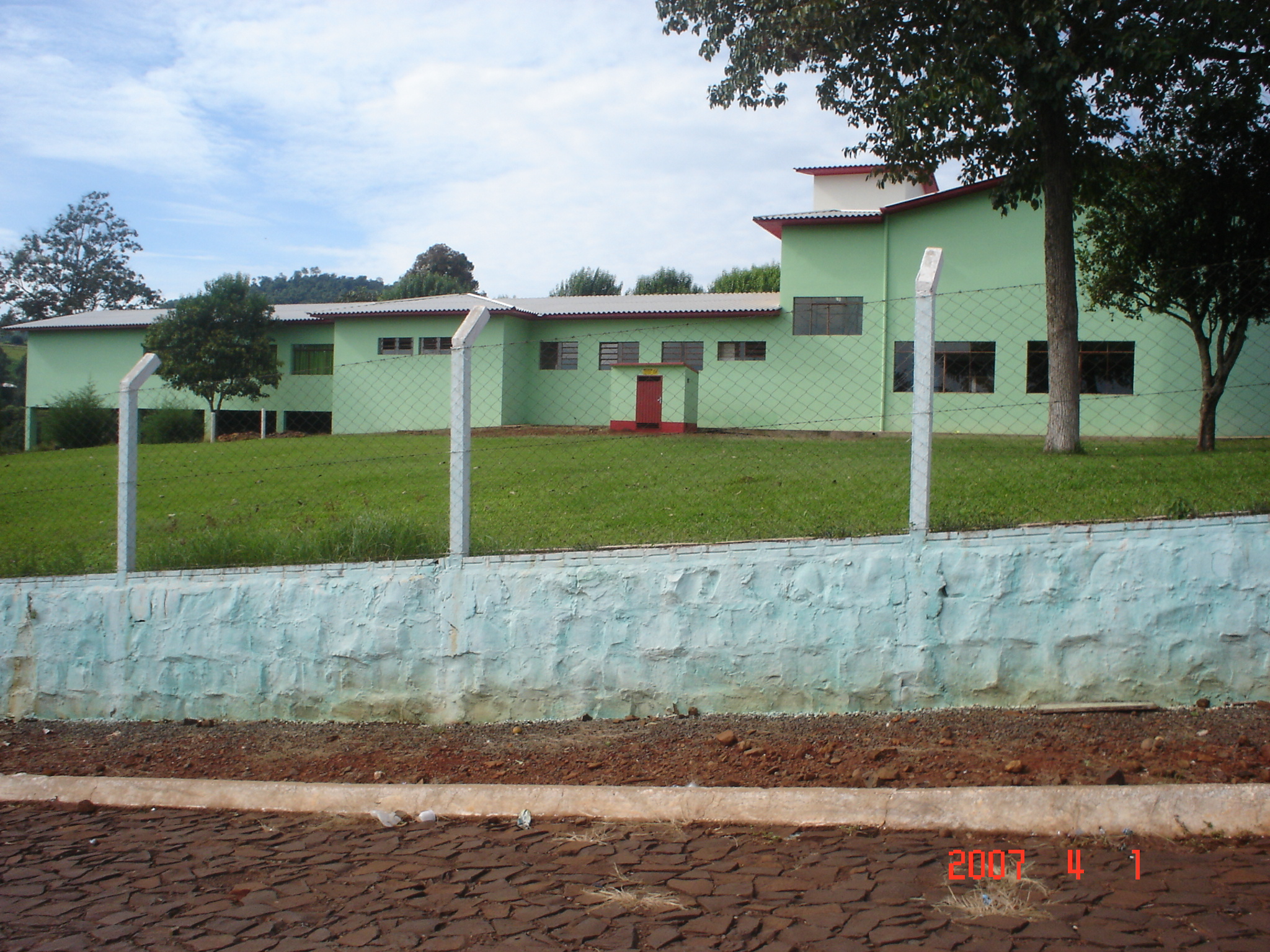

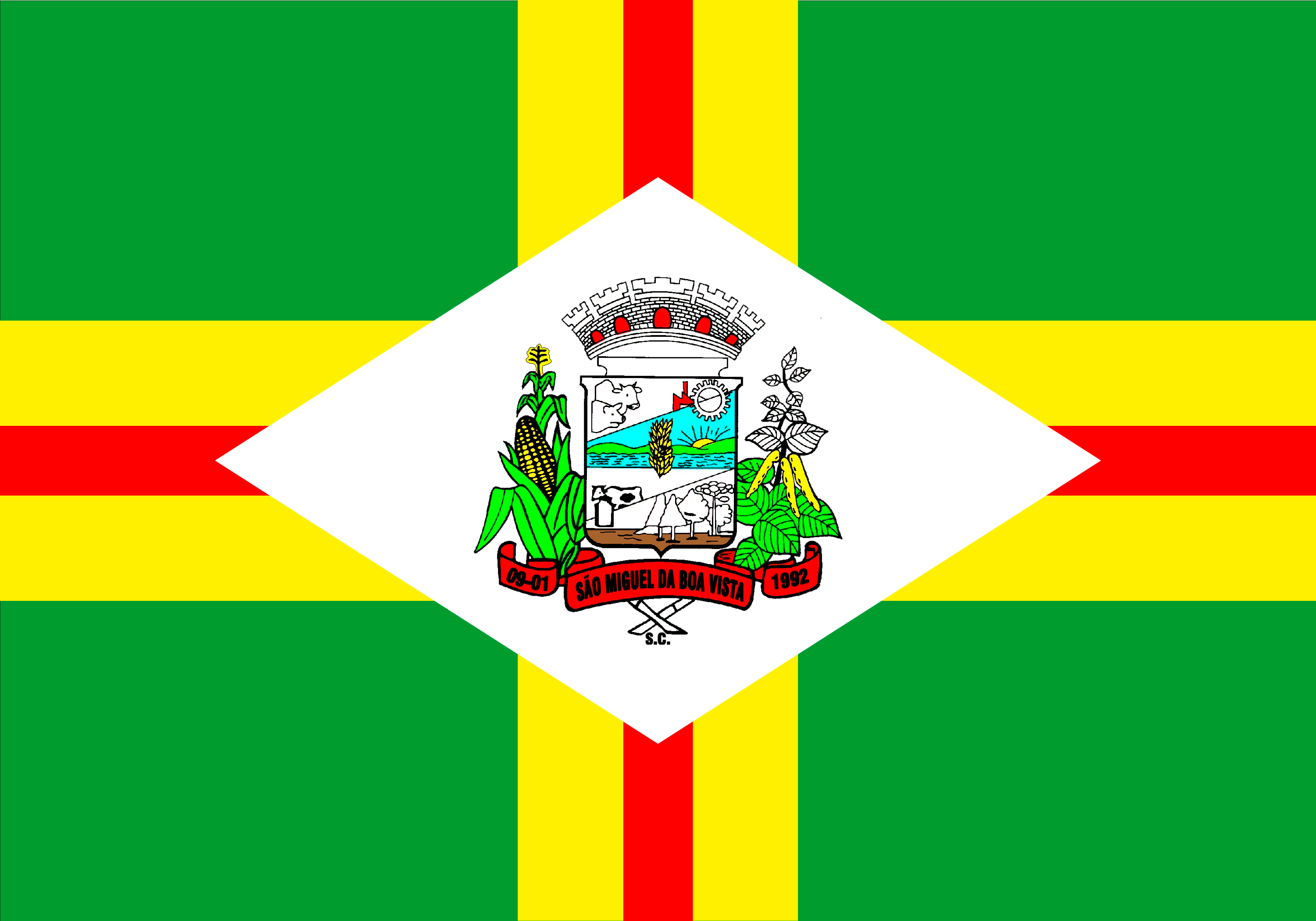
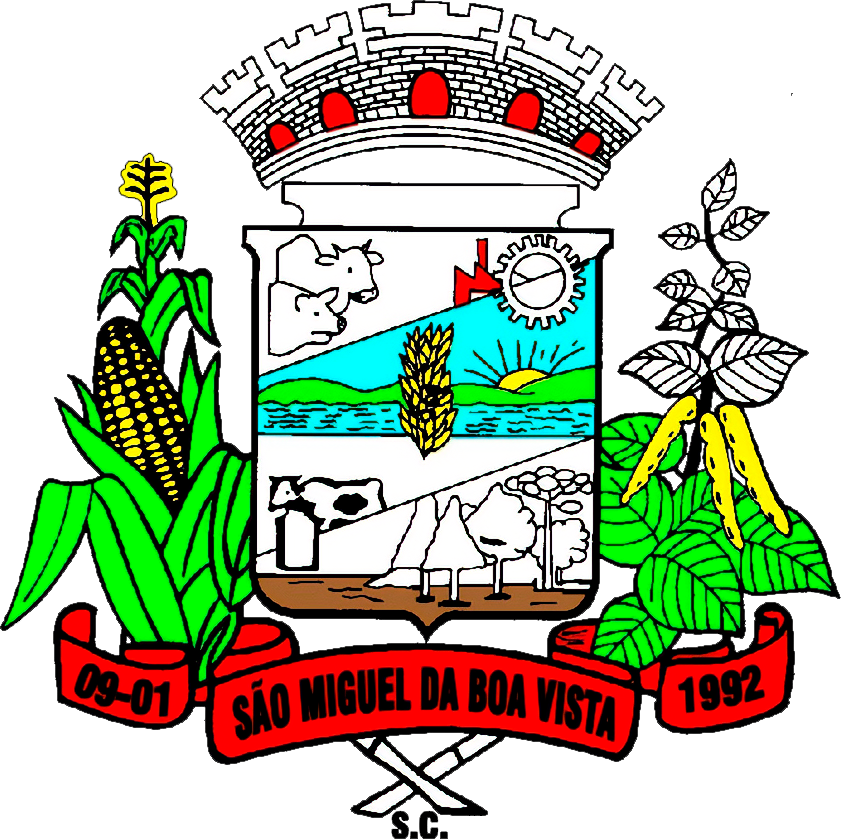
- Flag Coat of arms
- Interactive map of São Miguel da Boa Vista
- Country: Brazil
- Region: South
- State: Santa Catarina
- Mesoregion: Oeste Catarinense

Population (2020)
  - Total: 1,807
- Time zone: UTC -3
- Website: saomigueldaboavista.sc.gov.br

São Miguel da Boa Vista is a municipality in the state of Santa Catarina in the South region of Brazil.

== See also ==
- List of municipalities in Santa Catarina
