= Alto Bela Vista =

Coordinates: 27°26′S 51°52′W

- Municipality
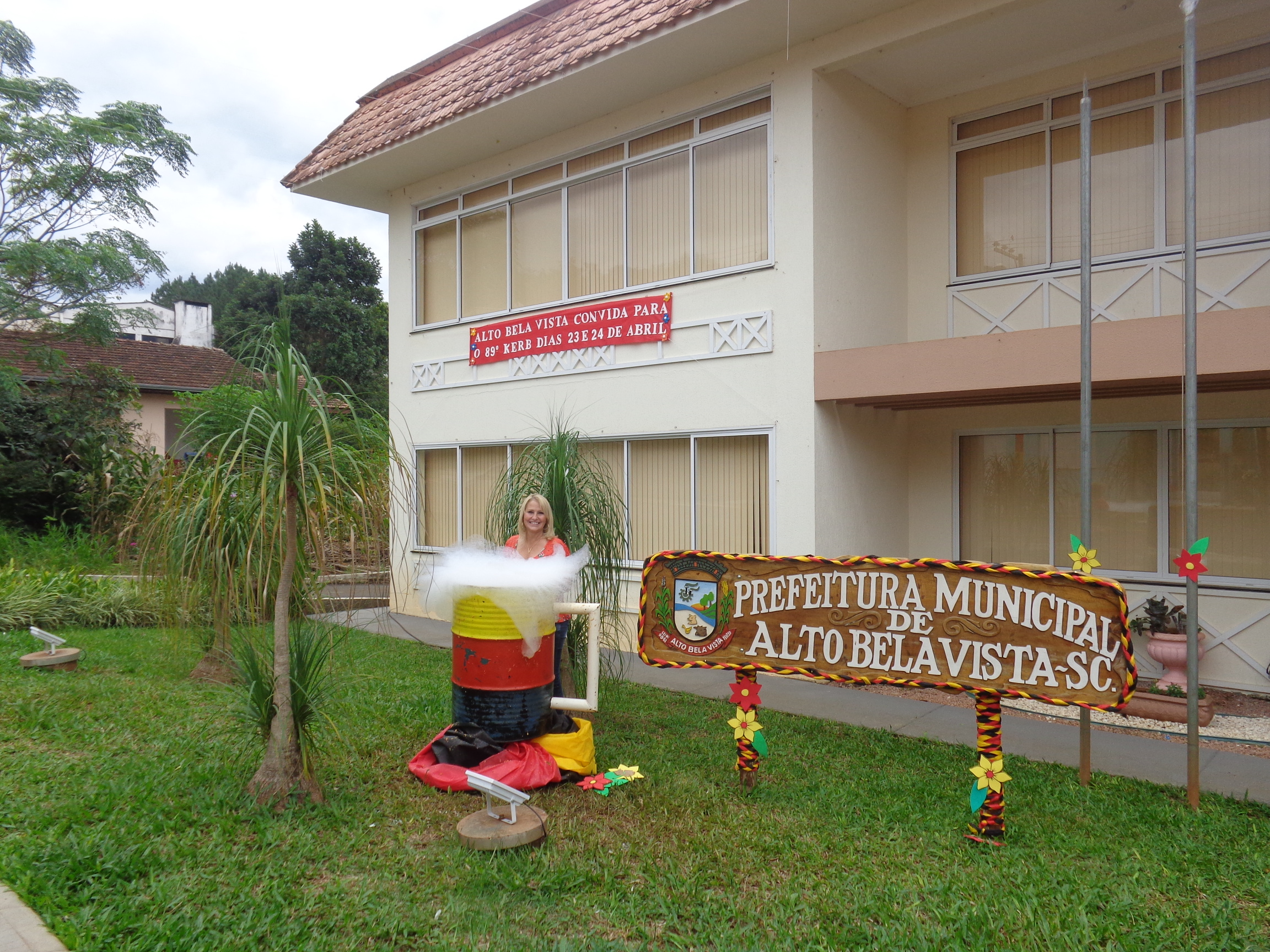

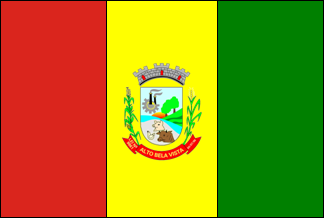
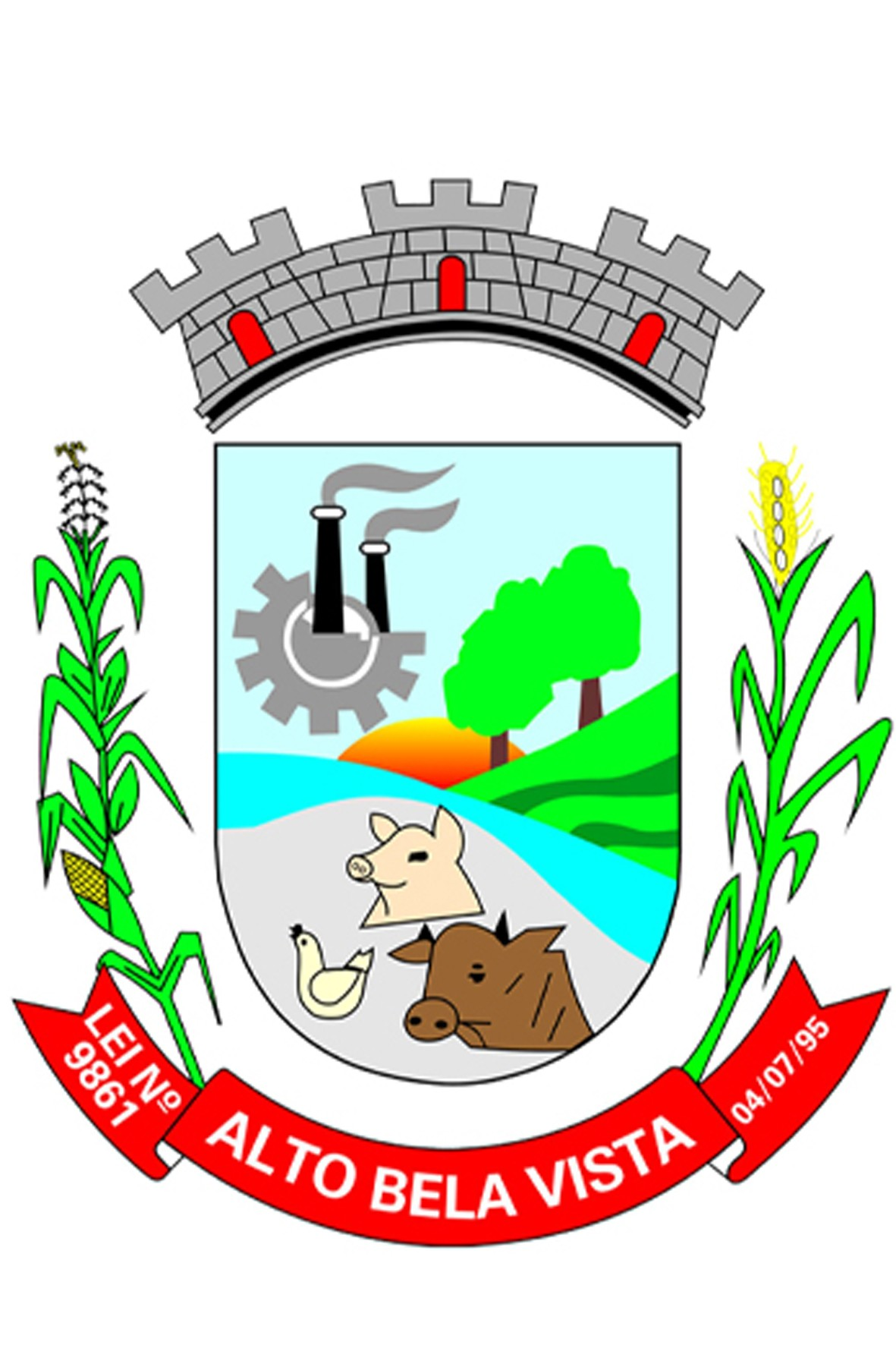
- Flag Coat of arms
- Interactive map of Alto Bela Vista
- Country: Brazil
- Region: South
- State: Santa Catarina
- Mesoregion: Oeste Catarinense

Population (2020)
  - Total: 1,926
- Time zone: UTC−3 (BRT)

Alto Bela Vista is a municipality in the state of Santa Catarina in the South region of Brazil.

== See also ==
- List of municipalities in Santa Catarina
