= Doutor Pedrinho =

Coordinates: 26°43′S 49°29′W

- Municipality
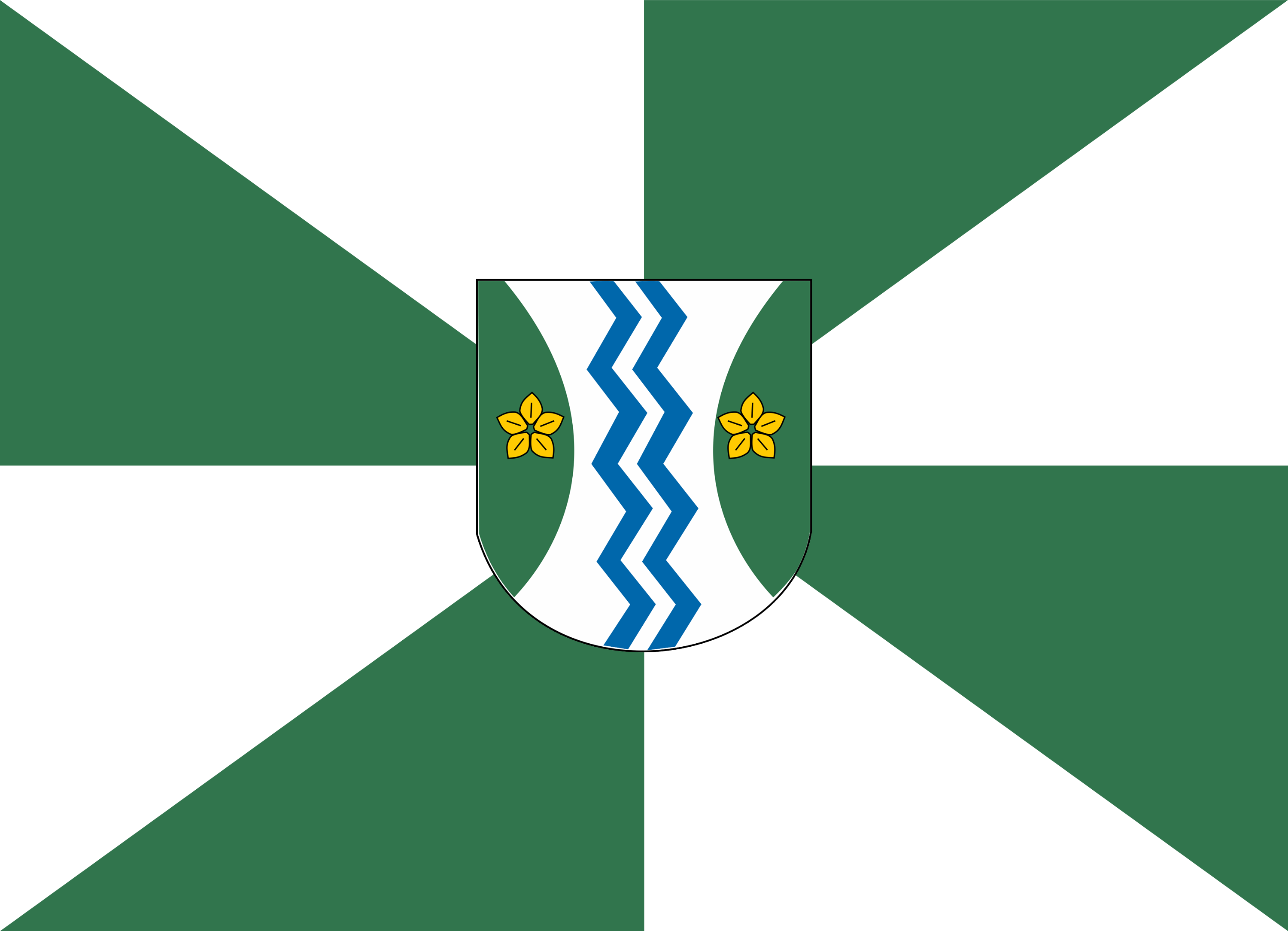
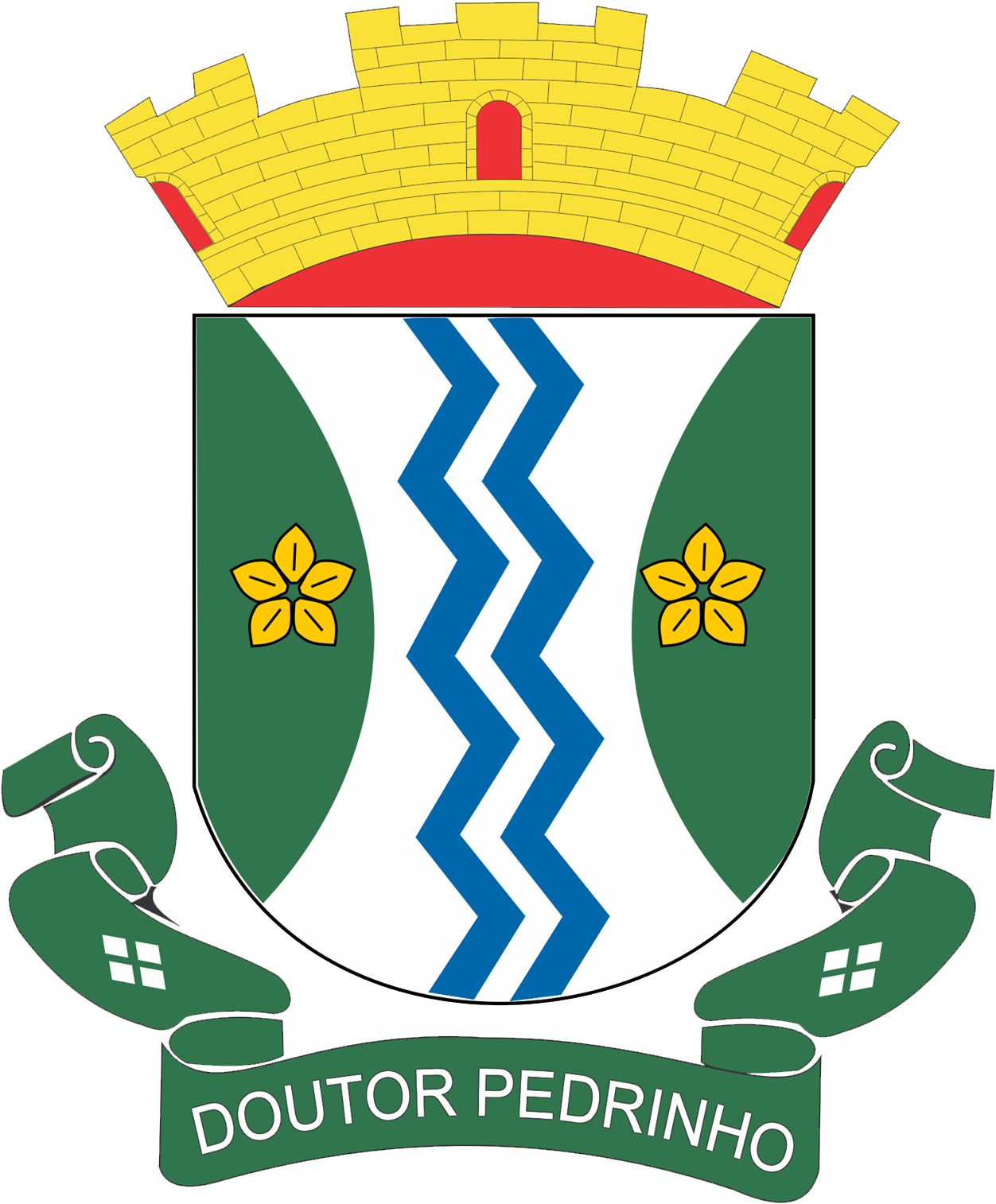
- Flag Coat of arms

- Location in the State of Santa Catarina

- Country: Brazil
- Region: South
- State: Santa Catarina
- Mesoregion: Vale do Itajai
- Founded: January 4, 1988
- Emancipation: June 1, 1989

Government
  - Mayor: Hartwig Persuhn (PP)

Population (2020)
  - Total: 4,115
- Time zone: UTC -3
- Website: doutorpedrinho.sc.gov.br

Doutor Pedrinho is a municipality in the state of Santa Catarina in the South region of Brazil. It is located at 26º42'52" from latitude South and 49º29'00" from longitude west, at an altitude of 530 meters. It has a population of 4,115, according to a 2020 Brazilian Institute of Geography and Statistics estimate. It has an area of 375.758 km².

== See also ==
- List of municipalities in Santa Catarina
