= Vitor Meireles =

- Municipality
- Municipality of Vitor Meireles
- Flag Coat of arms

- Location of Vitor Meireles

- Location in Brazil
- Country: Brazil
- Region: South
- State: Santa Catarina
- Mesoregion: Vale do Itajai

Government
  - Mayor: Bento Francisco Silvy

Area
  - Total: 143.253 sq mi (371.024 km^{2})
- Elevation: 1,210 ft (370 m)

Population (2020)
  - Total: 4,943
  - Density: 34.51/sq mi (13.32/km^{2})
- Time zone: UTC -3
- Postal code: 4219358
- HDI (2010): 0.673 – medium

Vitor Meireles is a municipality in the state of Santa Catarina in the South region of Brazil.

== See also ==
- List of municipalities in Santa Catarina
