= São João do Itaperiú =

Coordinates: 26.6178°S 48.7681°W

- Municipality
- Flag Coat of arms
- Interactive map of São João do Itaperiú
- Country: Brazil
- Region: South
- State: Santa Catarina
- Mesoregion: Vale do Itajai

Population (2020)
  - Total: 3,759
- Time zone: UTC -3

São João do Itaperiú is a municipality in the state of Santa Catarina in the South region of Brazil.

== See also ==
- List of municipalities in Santa Catarina
