= São Cristóvão do Sul =

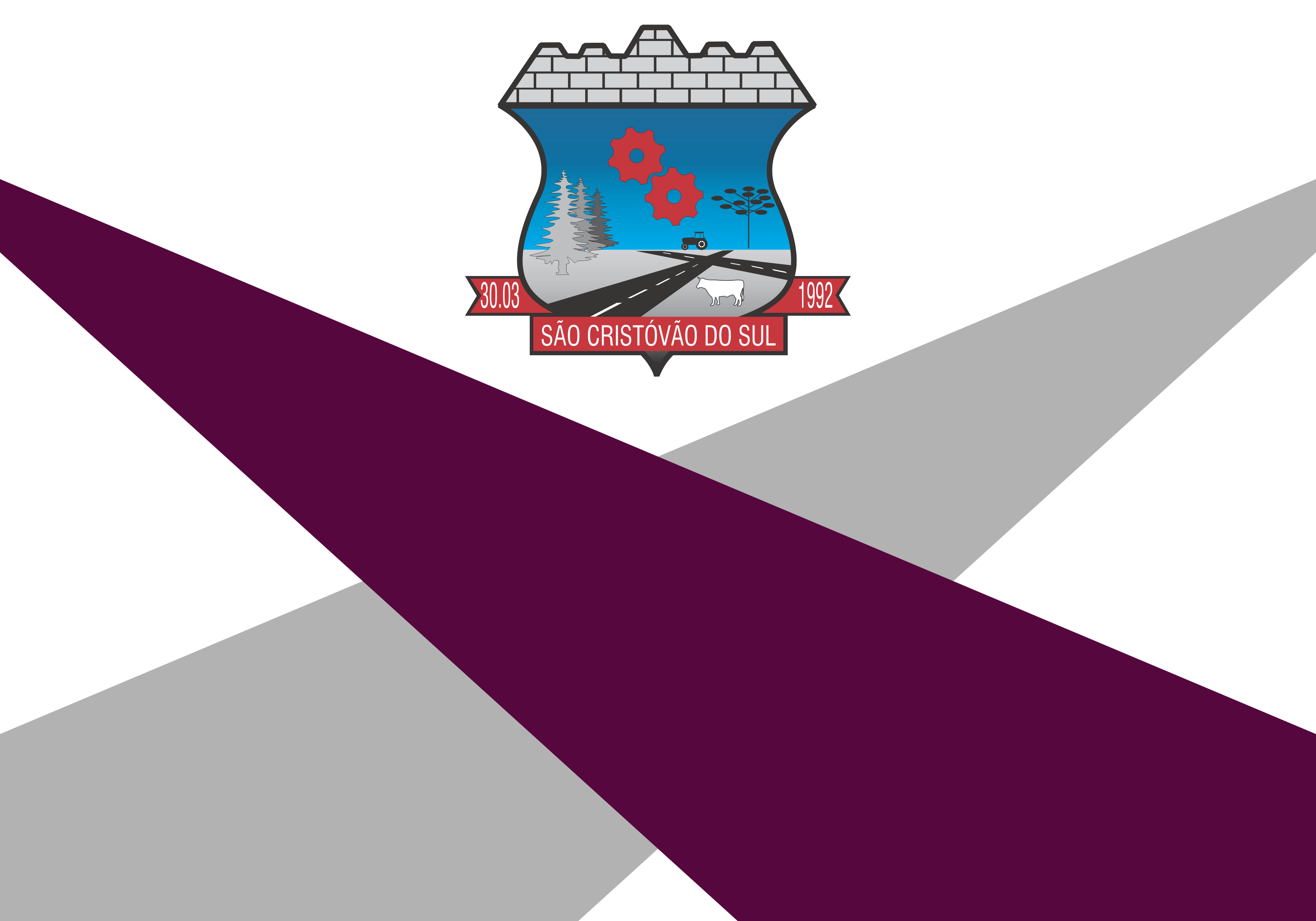
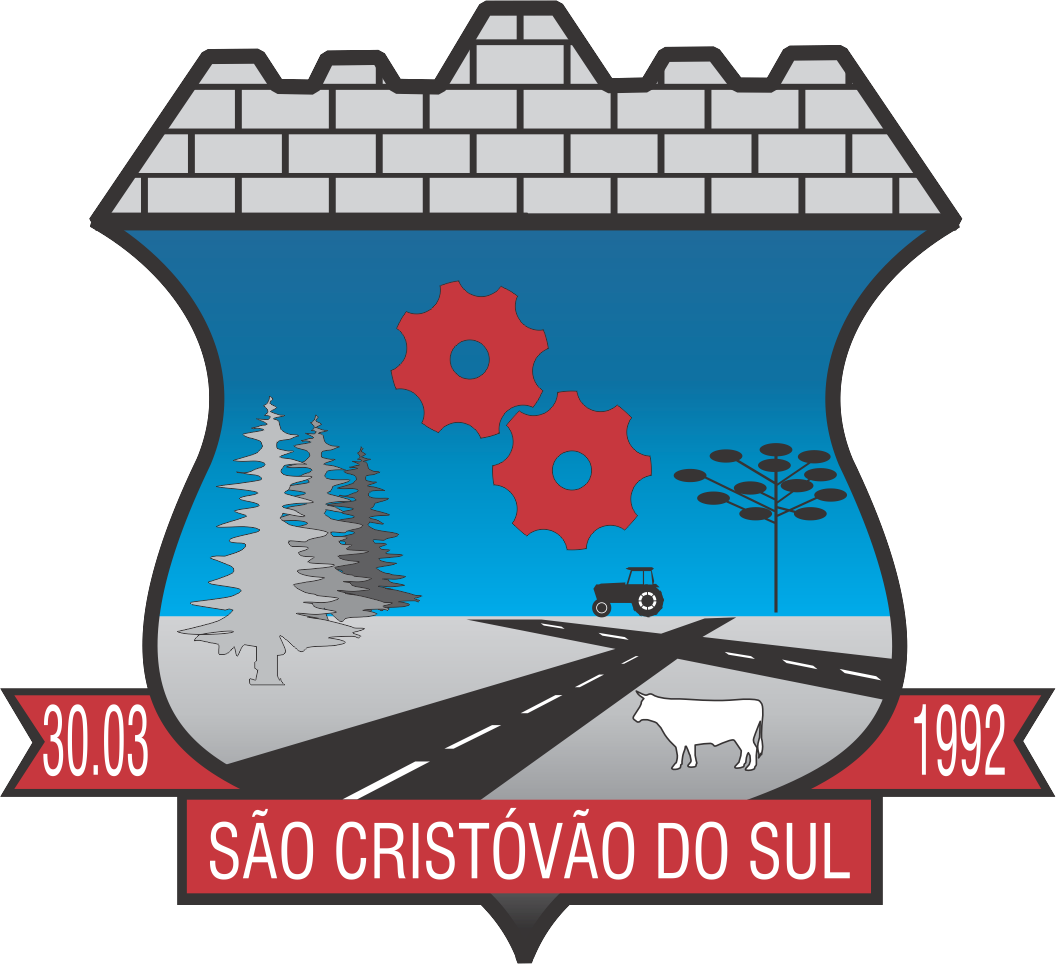
- Flag Coat of arms

- São Cristóvão do Sul

- Location within Brazil
- Coordinates: 27°16′00″S 50°26′26″W
- Country: Brazil
- Region: South
- State: (Santa Catarina (state)) Santa Catarina
- Founded: March 30, 1992

Government
  - Mayor: Jaime Cesca

Area
  - Total: 351 km^{2} (136 sq mi)
- Elevation: 1,025 m (3,363 ft)

Population (2020)
  - Total: 5,598
  - Density: 14.5/km^{2} (38/sq mi)
- Time zone: UTC-3 (UTC-3)
  - Summer (DST): UTC-2 (UTC-2)
- HDI (2000): 0.764
- Website: www.pmsc.sc.gov.br

São Cristóvão do Sul is a city in Santa Catarina, in the Southern Region of Brazil.
