= Presidente Nereu =

- Municipality
- Flag Coat of arms

- Location in the state of Santa Catarina

- Location in Brazil
- Coordinates: 27°16′37″S 49°23′24″W
- Country: Brazil
- Region: South
- State: Santa Catarina
- Mesoregion: Vale do Itajai

Area
  - Total: 87.160 sq mi (225.743 km^{2})

Population (2020)
  - Total: 2,283
  - Density: 26.19/sq mi (10.11/km^{2})
- Time zone: UTC -3

Presidente Nereu is a municipality in the state of Santa Catarina in the South region of Brazil.

== See also ==
- List of municipalities in Santa Catarina
