= Peritiba =

Coordinates: 27.3731°S 51.9039°W

- Municipality
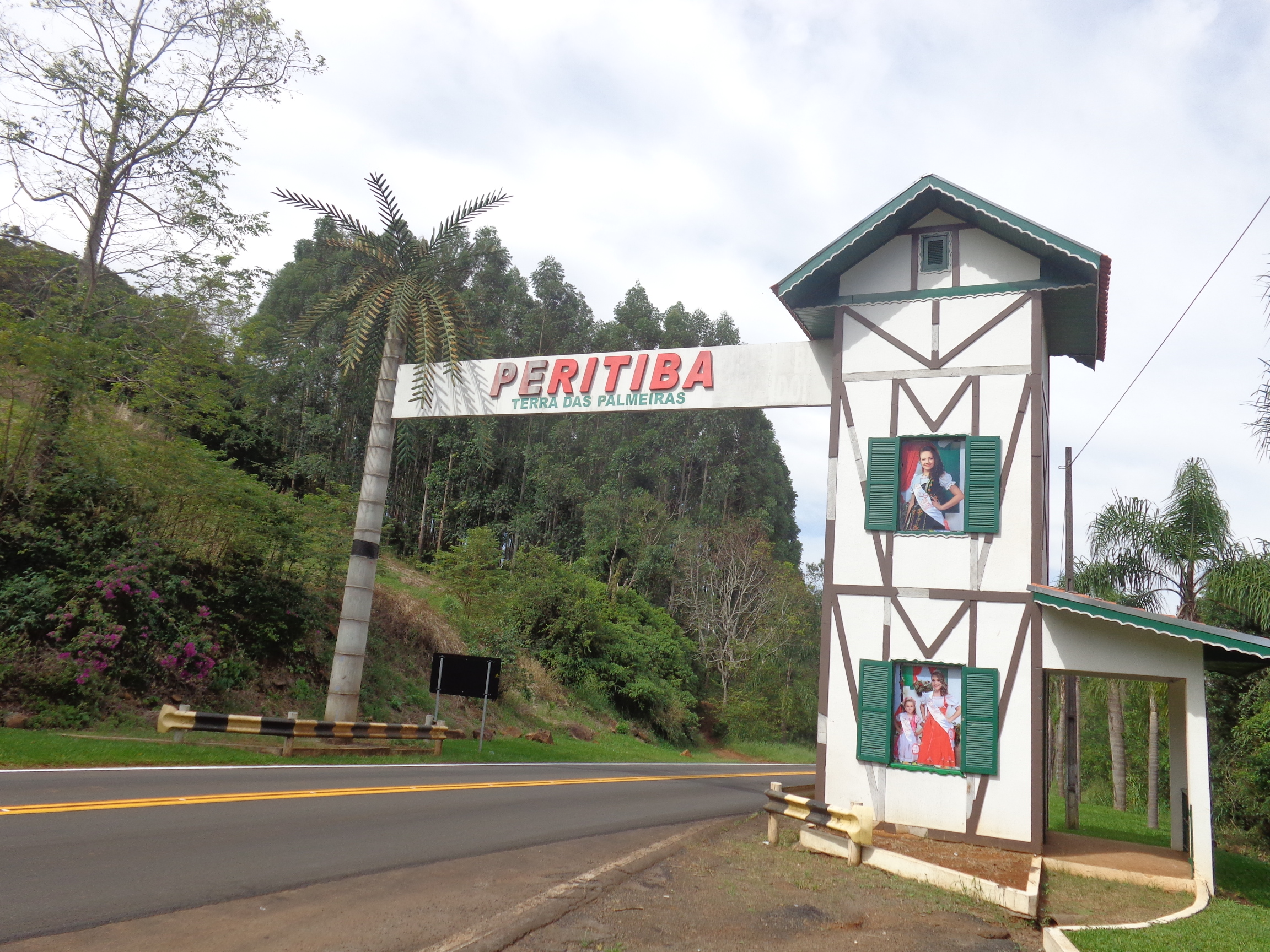

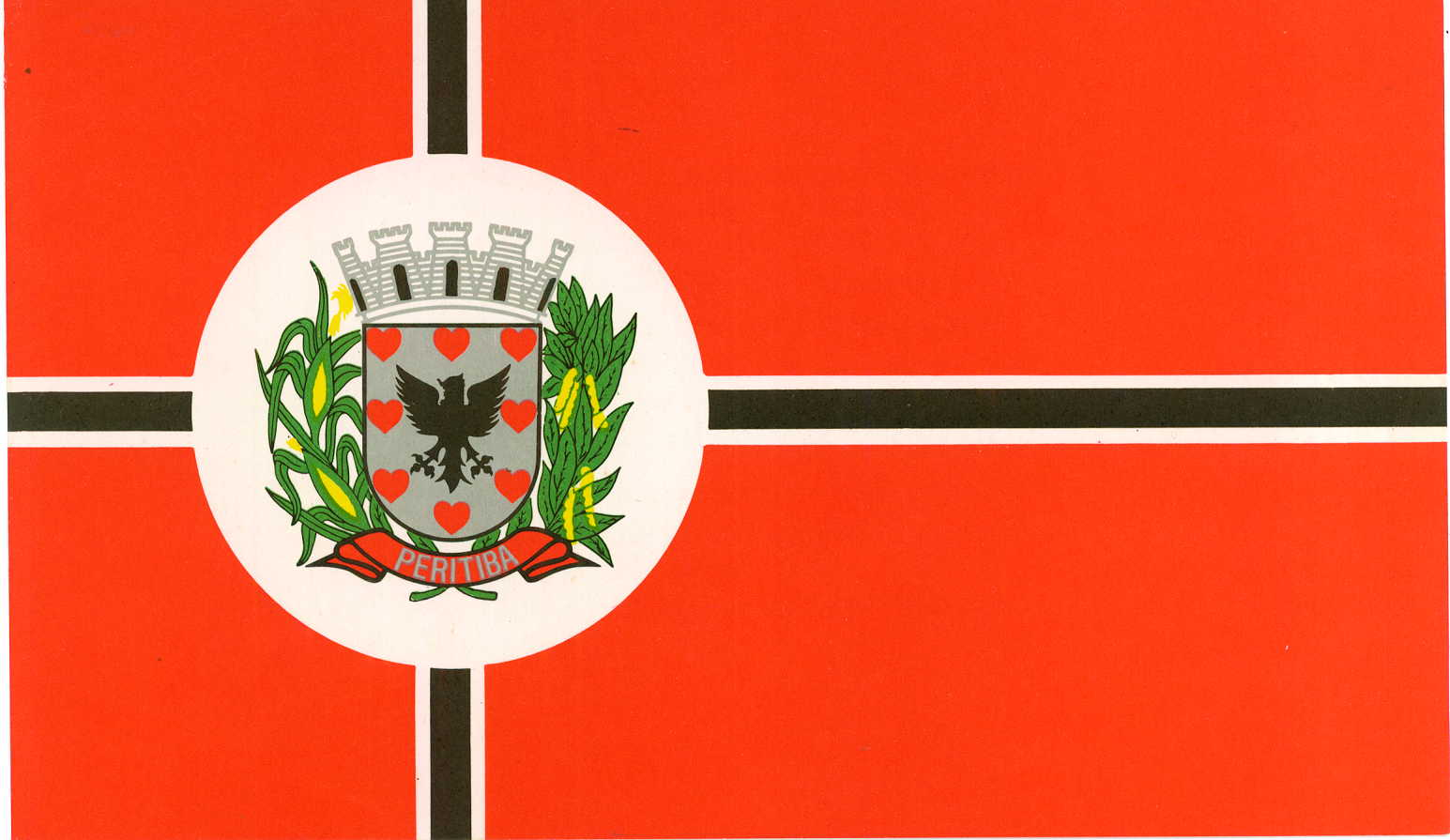
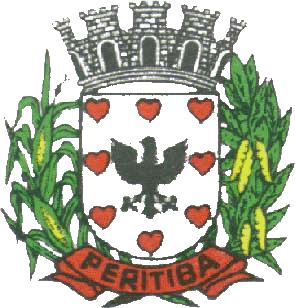
- Flag Coat of arms
- Interactive map of Peritiba
- Country: Brazil
- Region: South
- State: Santa Catarina
- Mesoregion: Oeste Catarinense

Population (2020)
  - Total: 2,760
- Time zone: UTC -3

Peritiba is a municipality in the state of Santa Catarina in the South region of Brazil.

== See also ==
- List of municipalities in Santa Catarina
