= Imbuia, Santa Catarina =

Coordinates: 24°52′S 51°00′W

- Municipality
- Flag Coat of arms
- Interactive map of Imbuia, Santa Catarina
- Country: Brazil
- Region: South
- State: Santa Catarina
- Mesoregion: Vale do Itajai

Population (2020)
  - Total: 6,241
- Time zone: UTC -3

Imbuia, Santa Catarina is a municipality in the state of Santa Catarina in the South region of Brazil.

== See also ==
- List of municipalities in Santa Catarina
