= Monge State Park =

State park in Paraná, Brazil

- Parque Estadual do Monge
- IUCN category II (national park)
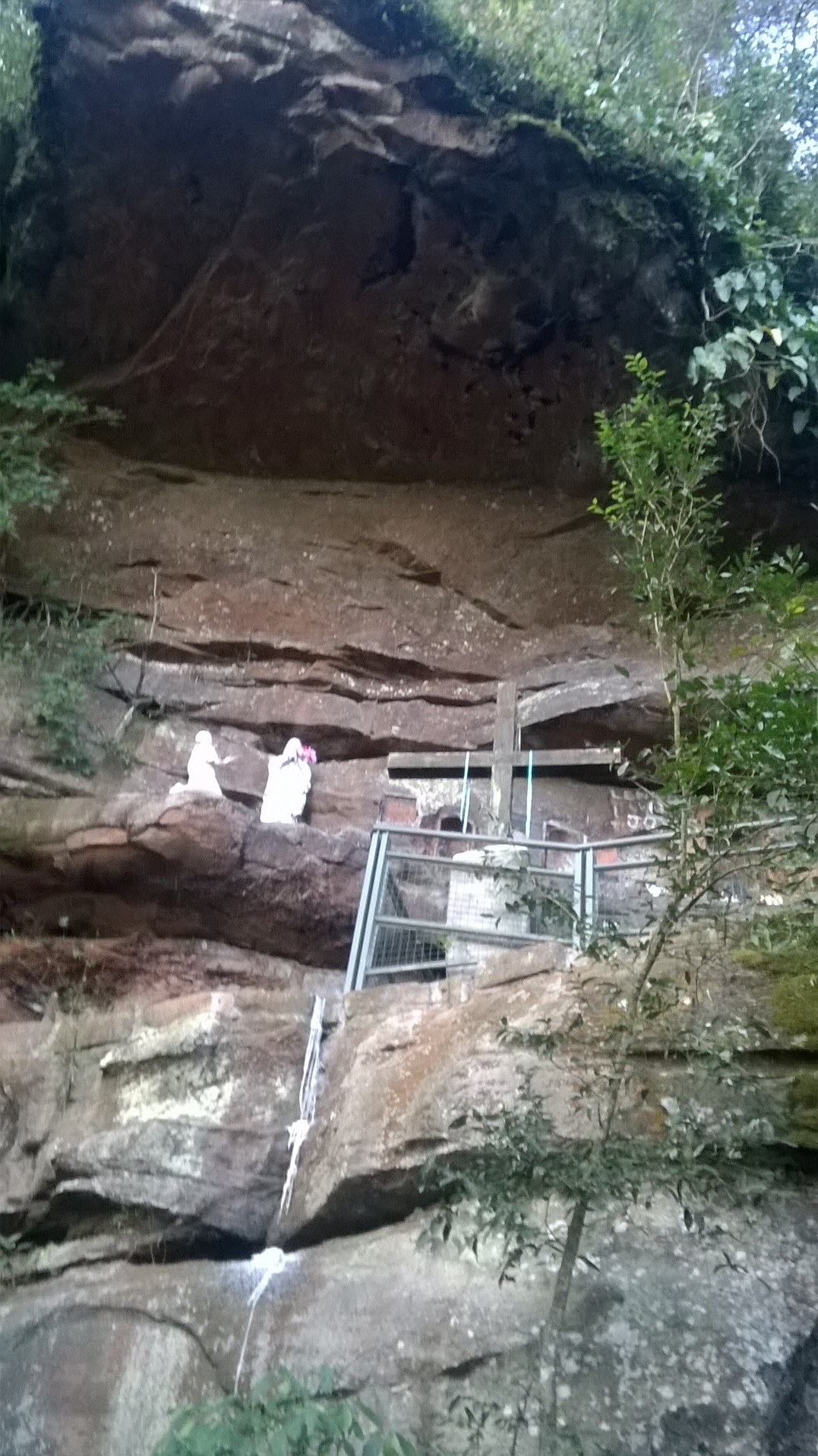
- The monk's cave

- Location within Brazil
- Location: Brazil
- Nearest city: Lapa, Paraná
- Coordinates: 25.781590°S 49.696468°W
- Area: 371.6 hectares (918 acres)
- Designation: State park
- Created: November 21, 1960
- Administrator: Instituto Ambiental do Paraná

The Monge State Park (Portuguese: Parque Estadual do Monge) is a state park in the state of Paraná, Brazil. It is named after a monk, or monks, who was said to have lived in a cave in the park for a while. The cave is now a pilgrimage destination for the monk's devotees.

== Location ==
The Monge State Park is in the municipality of Lapa, Paraná. It has an area of 371.6 hectares (918 acres) in the Atlantic Forest biome. The vegetation consists of open fields with some groups of trees and forests. There are access roads cutting through the park, and plantations of exotic trees. The park also has waterfalls and a source of water that it considered to be miraculous. It is in the Iguaçu River basin.

== History ==
The Monge State Park was created by decree 33.427 of 21 November 1960, and altered by subsequent decrees and laws in 1962, 1964, 1977 and 1979. A quarry was operated in the park at one time, but has been closed down. Ownership is divided between the Environmental Institute of Paraná (IAP) and the municipality. When the management plan was issued in December 2002 the area was 297.83 hectares (736.0 acres), other than areas that had not been expropriated.

The original vegetation had been cleared and replaced in the 1950s with pine and eucalyptus, invasive species. The IAP prepared a plan to eliminate the invasive species and restore the original meadows, funding the project from sale of the lumber. About 640 truck loads of logs were bought by a timber company in 2010, but the money was not reinvested in the park. Exotic trees reemerged. The existing infrastructure had been demolished, but work on the new structures was abandoned due to a moratorium by the state government. The park became a hang-out for drug users.

A new company was hired in 2013, and work resumed early in 2014. In February 2014 it was reported that the park would reopen in a few months with limited access after a process of structural modernization. The park would now promote tourism and trade in regional handicrafts. The sidewalks would be improved, as well as the parking area, oratory, lookout point and other facilities.

== Monks ==
Three "monks" named João Maria played a significant role in Lapa and other parts of Paraná and Santa Catarina. The first, João Maria d'Agostini, was an Italian immigrant who preached in the Matriz da Lapa in 1845. He travelled through the region giving guidance and prescribing medicinal herbs. After he left his devotees expected him to reappear. The "monk's cave" in the park is thought to have been his home. The second monk, Anastás Marcaf, arrived in Lapa in 1894 with the troops of Gumercindo Saraiva during the Federalist Revolution. A peaceful man, he had great influence with the country people.

The third monk was Miguel Lucena de Boaventura, who appeared during the dispute between the governments of Paraná and Santa Catarina over the Contestado territory. He appealed to the people who had been dispossessed or wronged by the government of the time, arming them and giving them military instruction. He called himself José Maria de Agostinho, brother of the first monk, and attracted growing numbers of followers. They were attacked in 1912 by Colonel João Gualberto. The colonel and the monk both died in combat, but the struggle continued until final defeat of the Contestado revolt after thousands had died.

== Activities ==
The park is visited for research, surveillance and religious tourism. There is a restaurant and bar in the park, and other vendors at the entrance. The park has volleyball courts, grills, snack bar, restaurant and sanitary facilities.

The main attraction is the monk's cave, a place of religious pilgrimage for thousands of faithful. The monk João Maria D’Agostini lived in the cave for some time, studying the plants of the region, praying, tending the sick and prophesying. The grotto is reached by a long stone staircase that lead down to a source of pure water. From here a trail leads to the "Pedra Partida", a large hall formed by a cleft in the rock formed through erosion.

== Sources ==
- Komarchesqui, Bruna (20 September 2013), "Abandono faz o parque místico da Lapa virar problema", Gazeta do Povo (in Portuguese)
- Lapa: Parque Estadual do Monge - Gruta do Monge (in Portuguese), Paraná Turismo
- "Parque Estadual do Monge Será Reinaugurado", Tribuna (in Portuguese), 12 February 2014
- "Recomeçam as obras no Parque Estadual do Monge", AltaMontanha.com (in Portuguese), 7 February 2014
- Siqueira, Joésio Deoclécio Pierin; Ferreira, Aguimar Mendes (December 2002), Plano de Manejo do Parque Estadual do Monge (PDF) (in Portuguese), Curitiba / PR: Instituto Ambiental Do ParanÁ - IAP
