= Contestado War =

Guerrilla war between settlers and landowners in Brazil (1912–1916)

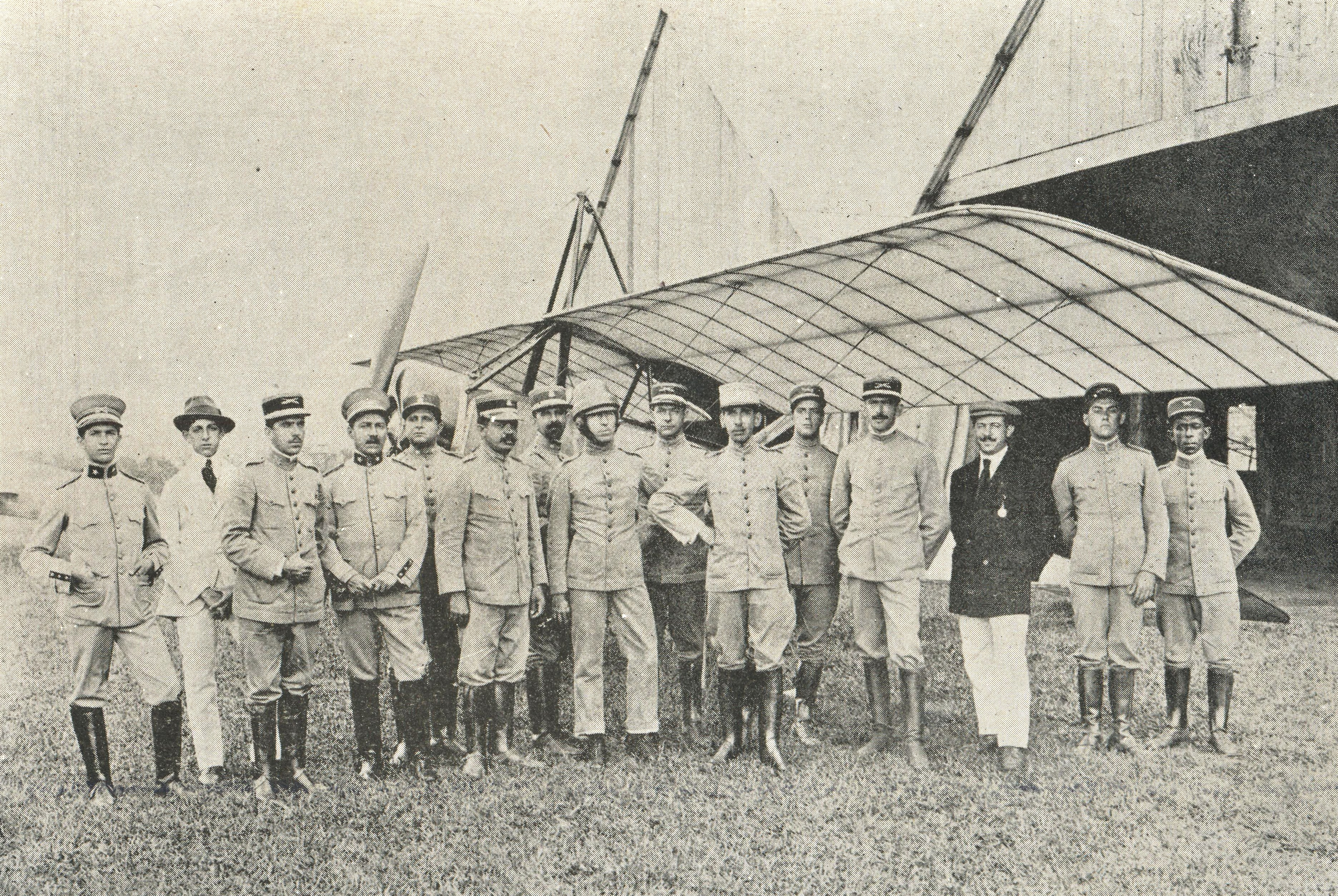
- Aviation of the Brazilian Army in the Contestado War, in 1915.
Date	October 1912 – August 1916
Location	Santa Catarina and Paraná, Brazil
Result	Government victory

Belligerents
Rebels	Brazil; Paraná

Commanders and leaders
José Maria †; Maria Rosa †; Adeodato (surrendered)	(Brazil) Hermes da Fonseca; (Brazil) Carlos de Mesquita; (Brazil) S. de Carvalho; (Brazil) Francisco Estillac; (Brazil) Tertuliano Potiguara; João Gualberto †

Units involved
Unknown	Brazilian Army; Public Force of Paraná; Public Force of Santa Catarina

Strength
10,000 rebels	7,000 army soldiers 1,000 local police 1,000 civil militiamen 3 aircraft

Casualties and losses
5,000–8,000 dead, wounded or disappeared	800–1,000 dead, wounded or disappeared
- Total deaths including civilians between 10,000-20,000

The Contestado War (Portuguese: Guerra do Contestado), broadly speaking, was a guerrilla war for land between settlers and landowners, the latter supported by the Brazilian state's police and military forces, that lasted from October 1912 to August 1916.

It was fought in an inland southern region of the country, rich in wood and yerba mate, that was called Contestado because it was contested by the states of Paraná and Santa Catarina as well as Argentina. The war had its casus belli in the social conflicts in the region, the result of local disobediences, particularly regarding the regularization of land ownership on the part of the caboclos. The conflict was permeated by religious fanaticism expressed by the messianism and faith of the rebellious caboclos that they were engaged in a religious war; at the same time, it reflected the dissatisfaction of the population with its material situation.

== Background ==
=== Status of monks ===
The Contestado War is often considered to have many roots in the influence of three monks of the region. The first who rose to prominence was João Maria D'Agostini, a man of Italian origin, who wandered, preaching and attending to the sick, from 1844 to 1870. He lived a very simple life, and his ethics and lifestyle attracted thousands of followers. Although many sources say he died in 1870, he actually left Brazil in 1852; after traveling in Mexico, Cuba, and Canada, he was killed in April, 1869; in Mesilla, New Mexico, USA.

The second monk also adopted the alias of João Maria, although his real name was Atanás Marcaf, probably of Syrian origin. He appeared to the public during the Federalist Revolution of 1893; where he belonged to the Maragato faction, and projected a firm and even messianic stature. He even made prophecies about the political events of his time. He was active in the region between the Iguaçu and Uruguay rivers. In addition to his religious activities, he would also gain a reputation as a healer before disappearing from the region in 1908.

In 1912, A third monk came to the notice of the public in the region. He was initially known as an herbal healer, having presented himself under the name of José Maria de Santo Agostinho. However, according to a report of the police of Vila de Palmas, Paraná state, he was, in reality, an army deserter who had been convicted of rape, by the name of Miguel Lucena de Boaventura.

Due in part to his claimed association with the regionally known figure of João Maria, the anonymity of his past, and his conduct as a herbal healer, José Maria soon became a respected and influential figure in the region. He would soon amass a religious following from the locals, and it would be claimed he performed a number of miracles, one of the most prominent being the claimed resurrection of another individual. He was also said to have cured the colonel Francisco de Almeida's wife of a previously uncurable illness. After this event the monk won even more fame and trust by declining the land and significant quantity of gold that the grateful colonel offered him.

From this point on, José Maria began to be considered a saint: a man who had come to Earth only to heal the sick and aid the needy. Methodical and organized, he was quite different from the familiar healers. He knew how to read and write and he described in his notebooks the medical properties of the plants found in the region. With the permission of Colonel Almeida, he set up what was known as the "people's pharmacy" at the ranch of one of the foremen, where he stored up medicinal herbs that he used in his daily medical consultations with anyone who wished to visit him, until the late hours of the night.

José Maria's preaching displayed acutely Monarchist sentiments and adopting a highly adversarial stance towards the existing national government of Brazil. This intense endorsement of monarchy as a form of government would come to inform the shape of the Contestado war's partisan movement.

=== Railroad ===
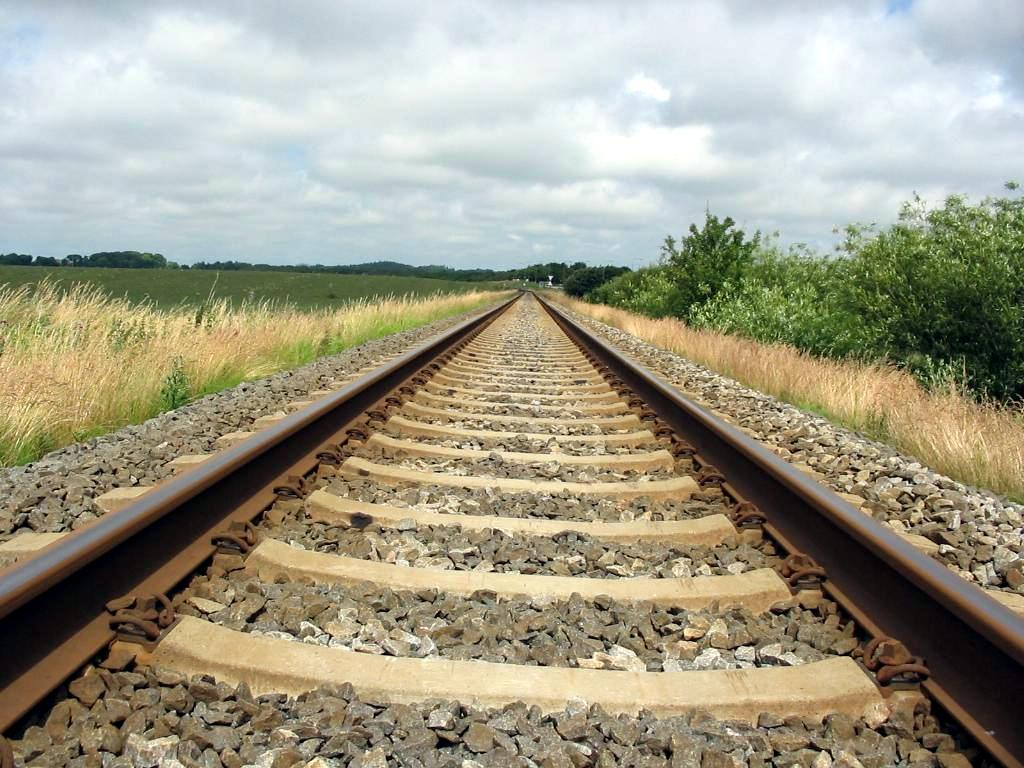
The railroad, one of the causes of the Contestado War

Construction was underway on a railway that would run between the cities of São Paulo to Santa Maria, in the southern Brazilian state Rio Grande do Sul, much of which ran through the contested territory. The construction of this railroad was commissioned by President Afonso Pena in 1908, and the task would be contracted to a North American based company known as the Brazil Railway Company, under the ownership of Percival Farquhar.

In addition to the right to finish the project, the company also obtained from the government the right to explore a strip of land 15 km (9.32 mi) wide on each side of the railroad. The Company thus legally seized ownership of the land that it bordered and offered work to local families during the construction of the railroad. A number of communities in the region, living off subsistence agriculture, existed in the path of this newly privatized strip of land leading to the expulsion of many farmers of the region from the land they occupied.

At the same time, the concession guaranteed that another associated company of the trust, the Southern Brazil Lumber & Colonization, would have the rights to extract lumber and later resell the land.

It was estimated that 8000 men had worked for the railroad at the time; with the workers coming largely from the urban populations of cities Rio de Janeiro and Pernambuco.

However, by the time the construction work was finished a large number of people were left without work or a place to go (as much land around the railroad was legally owned by the Trust) adding to the local unrest.

== Beginning ==
Thousands of the workers that were laid off once the railroad construction work was finished, joined with a large portion of local peasants that had been evicted from the land they had lived on, led by José Maria.

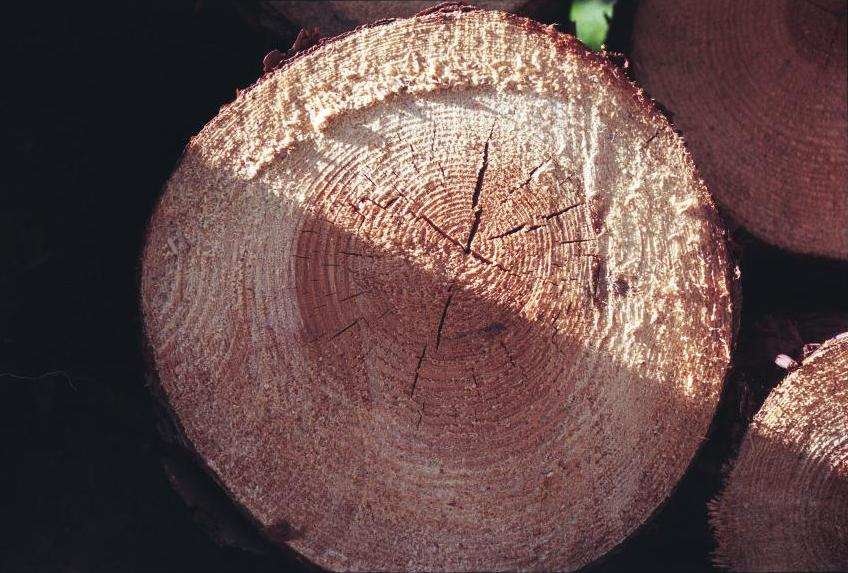
Lumber, one of the commodities extracted by the railroad company during the Contestado uprising

The "holy monk" José Maria rose against the recently created Republic of Brazil (1889), effectively declaring his community to be ruled by an independent government. He also declared the Republic to be "the devil's law". He appointed an illiterate farmer to be "Emperor of Brazil", founded the community of Quadro Santo and created a personal guard corps of 12 men, in an allusion to Charlemagne's knights.

Peasants followed him around, founding more communities, each one with an assigned patron saint in hopes of creating a "heavenly monarchy" similar to Antonio Conselheiro (the messianic leader from the Canudos rebellion in Bahia during the late 1890s).

The monk's popularity by then was at its peak. He was invited to the Senhor do Bom Jesus celebrations in Taquaruçu (modern-day Curitibanos) whereby he was followed by about 300 supporters. He also treated people and prescribed herbal medication to them.

Wary of the developments in Taquaruçu and afraid of losing influence in the local affairs around the town of Curitibanos, Colonel Franciso de Albuquerque, a rival of Col. Almeida, sent a telegram to the state capital requesting assistance against "rebels that proclaimed a new monarchy in Taquaruçu".

== First casualties ==
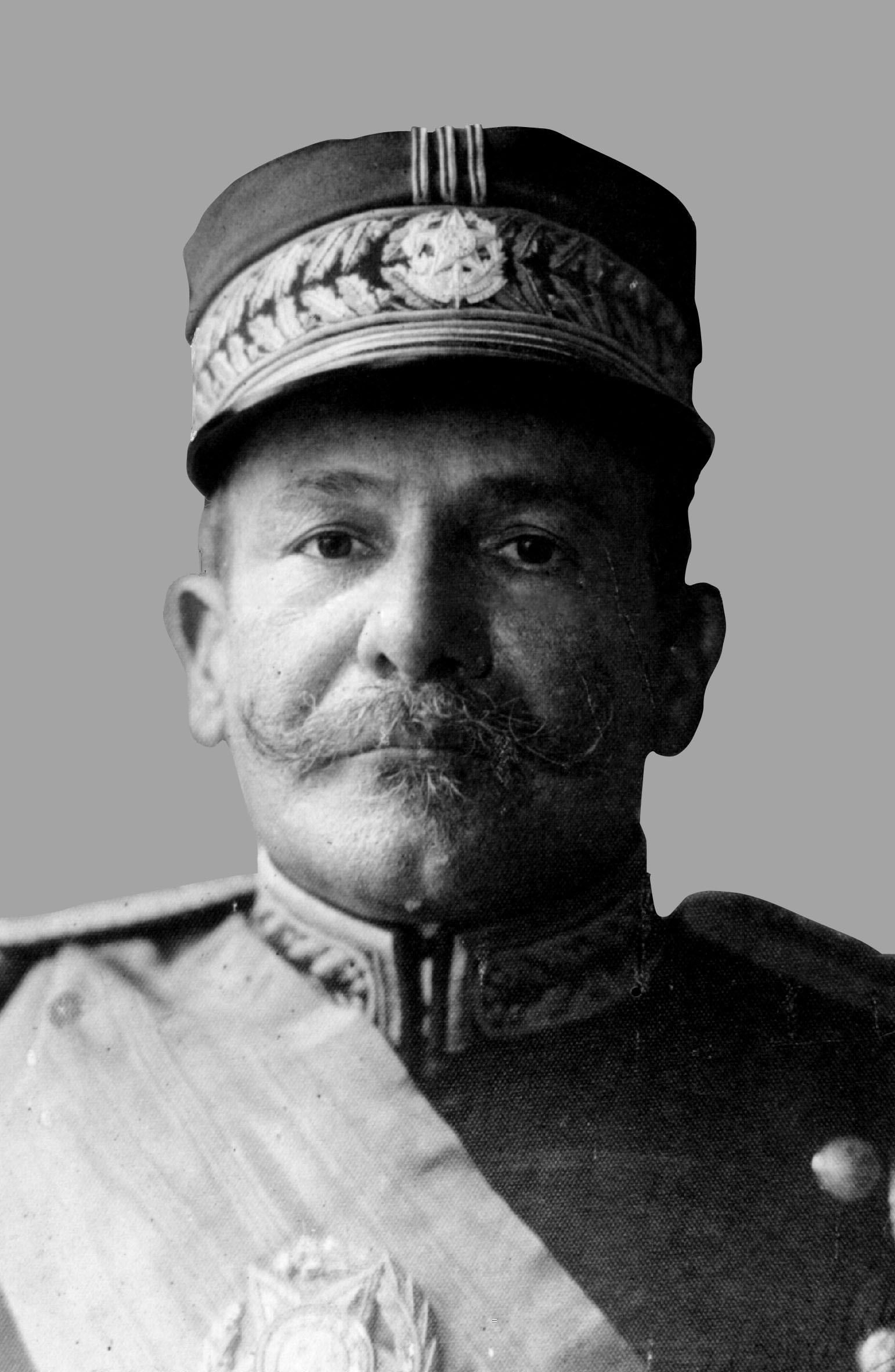
Marshal Hermes da Fonseca, President of Brazil

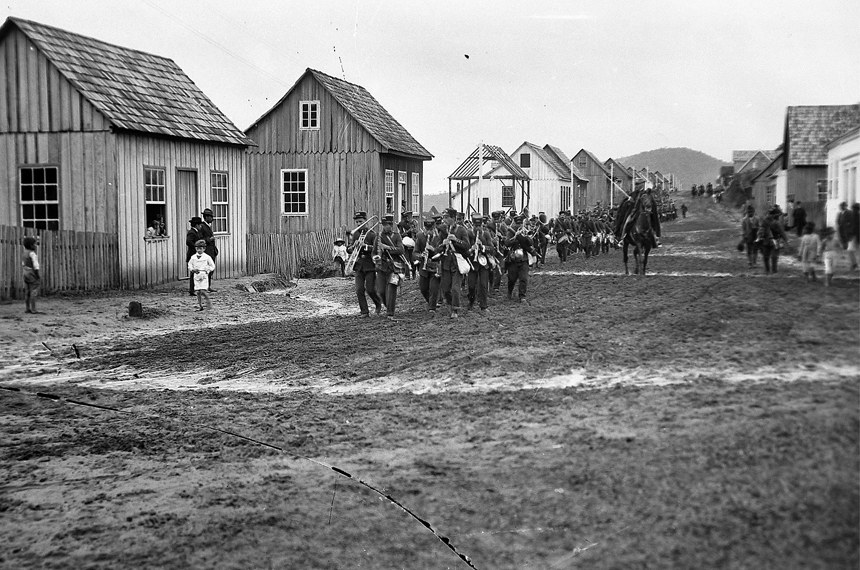
Infantry of the Police Corps marching towards the battle. Commander João Gualberto (mounted on the horse), leading the troop, was killed in combat soon after the photograph

The Brazilian government, then led by Marshal Hermes da Fonseca who was responsible for the policy of military interventions in other states in order to eliminate political adversaries, decided to send federal troops to that region in order to quell the rebellion.

Foreseeing what was coming, José Maria (Miguel Lucena Boaventura) left immediately for the border town of Irani with his followers. Irani at the time belonged to the municipality of Palmas which was within the jurisdiction of the state of Paraná. As Paraná and Santa Catarina then had unresolved land disputes, the government of Paraná regarded this mass relocation of people as a strategy by the State of Santa Catarina to occupy and claim those lands. So the Contestado war began there in October 1912. In order to prevent the sudden mass occupation of that land, some troops of the Regiment of Security of Paraná State were sent out to force the invaders to return to Santa Catarina.

But things did not go as planned. A bloody confrontation started between government troops and followers of the Contestado at a place called Banhado Grande. At the end of the battle, dozens of people from both sides were dead, and the rebels seized a large number of guns and amounts of ammunition from the Paraná police forces. Among those killed were Colonel Gualberto João, who commanded the troops, and also the Monk Jose Maria, but the partisans of the Contestado had obtained their first victory.

Jose Maria was buried by his followers, who hoped for his resurrection (in similar fashion to the legend of the king Sebastian of Portugal, who was revered by some messianic followers of Sebastianism).

The federal government sent in 200 federal troops on December 29, 1913, in order to deal with the rebellion. Once again, the government was upset by the fierce opposition. For some historians, this is considered to be the official beginning of the war, despite the initial confrontations back in 1912.

== Continuing conflict ==
On February 8, 1914, the federal and state governments sent 700 men to Taquaruçu, supported by artillery and machine guns. Caraguatá was a more remote location where 2,000 other people had already settled. The followers in Caraguatá were led by Maria Rosa, a 15-year-old girl who led the 6000-strong armed rebellion after the death of José Maria.

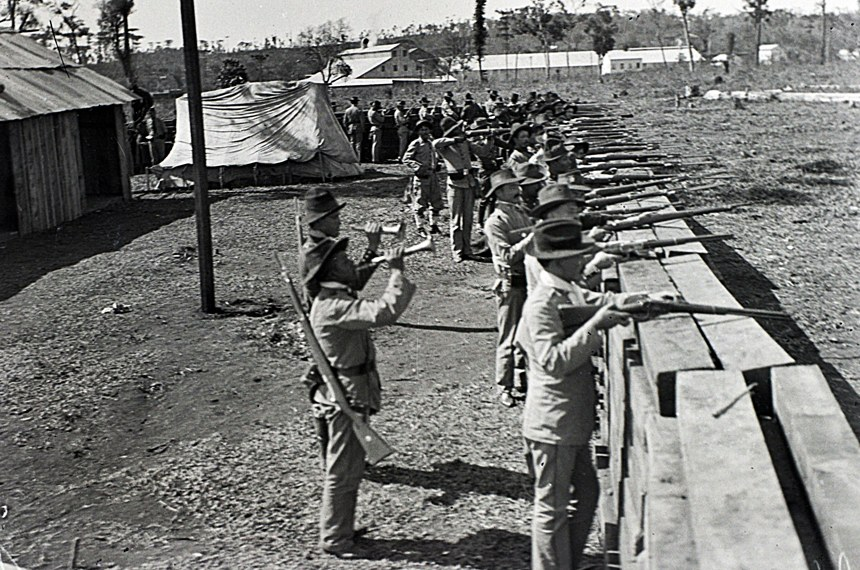
Army soldiers defending sawmill during rebel attack in Três Barras (SC).

In March and May of that year other expeditions were sent out; however, they were all unsuccessful. As the social order degraded quickly in the region, the central government appointed General Carlos Frederico de Mesquita (a veteran of the Canudos rebellion) to lead a new operation against the rebels. He led an assault on the village of Santo Antônio da Platina, causing the rebels to flee. The hamlet of Caraguatá where the federal troops were first chased from by the rebels was now struck by typhoid fever. General Mesquita mistakenly believed the rebels were finally dispersed and declared the war was over.

However, peace was to be short-lived. The rebels quickly regrouped and organized around Santa Maria, intensifying the attacks: they took and set fire to the Calmon rail station; destroyed the village of São João (present-day Matos Costa), they attacked Curitibanos and threatened Porto União, causing the population to flee. There were rumours that they were on their way to invade the city of Ponta Grossa and some believed the rebels and their army would march all the way to Rio de Janeiro in order to oust the President. The rebels at the time already controlled 25,000 km^{2}.

The federal government named General Setembrino de Carvalho the leader of the operation against the rebels in southern Brazil. So in September 1914 he led about 7,000 men with the mandate to suppress the rebellion and thus pacify the region at any cost. Setembrino sent out an announcement to the rebels in which he guaranteed the land would be returned to those who turned themselves in. He also promised, however, a harsh and hostile treatment to those who decided to continue the armed uprising against the government.

== Change of strategy and war's end ==
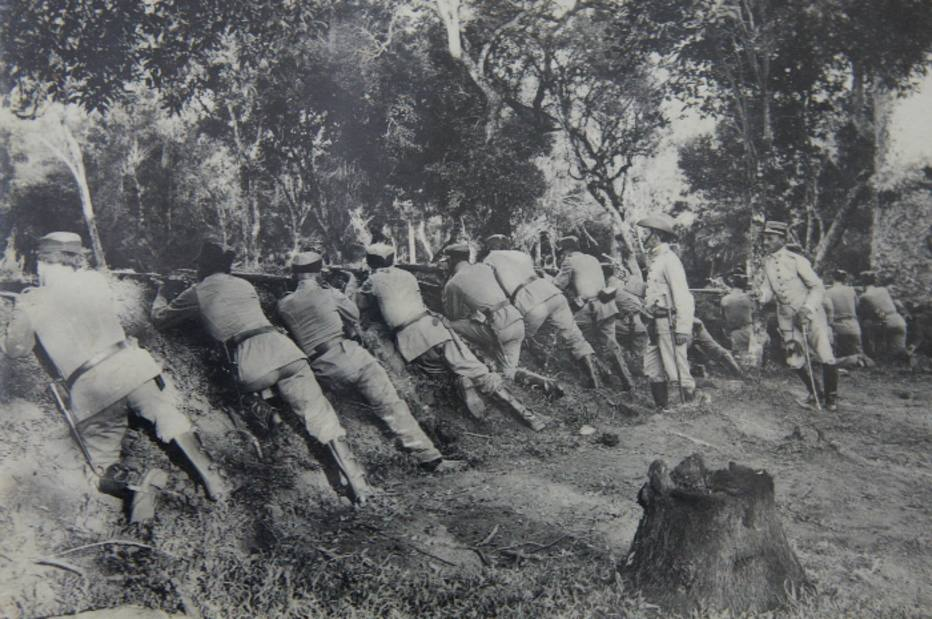
Brazilian Army soldiers in combat

At this point in the war Deodato Manuel Ramos (also known as Adeodato) became a prominent figure, and he is considered by historians to be the last leader of the Contestadores. Adeodato moved the capital of the rebellious territory over to the Santa Maria valley, where he amassed about 5,000 men. As food and other shortages increased, he became more ruthless in dealing orders, including the execution of those willing to turn themselves in.

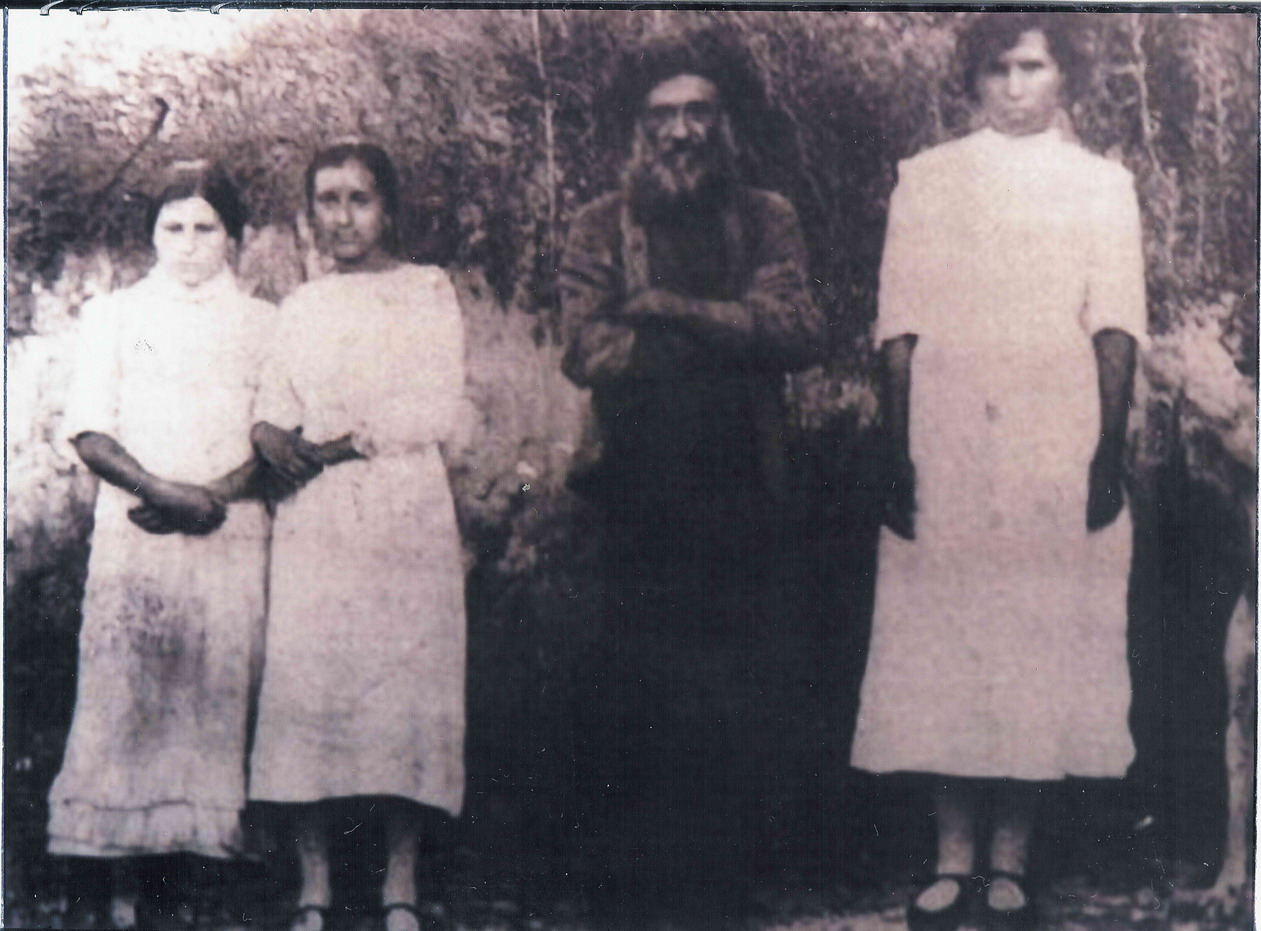
José Maria (died 1912), monk who led the Contestado revolt, with three followers.

By then the rebels were totally enclosed, and internal strife further weakened them. On February 8, 1915, a column from the south led by Lt. Col. Estillac arrived in Santa Maria. That attack cost the Army 30 dead and 40 injured. New pushes and retreats took place in the next few days.

On March 28, 1915, Captain Tertuliano Potyguara led 710 men from the town of Reinchardt towards Santa Maria, losing 24 men in the process. After several strikes, the spiritual leader of the insurgents, Maria Rosa, was killed on the banks of the Caçador river. On the 3rd of April, Estillac's and Potyguara's troops advanced towards the final assault on Santa Maria, where a few of the starving rebels still lived.

On the 5th of April, after the major attack on Santa Maria, General Estillac wrote that "everything was destroyed, the estimated number of razed houses is 5000 (...) women that fought along the men were killed (...) the number of irregulars killed is over 600. The villages of Caçador and Santa Maria were annihilated. I cannot guarantee that all such bandits that festered in the Contestado may have disappeared, but the mission entrusted to the Army is now accomplished." The surviving rebels soon dispersed and moved to other towns and cities.

In December 1915, the last of the rebellious villages was destroyed by Gen. Setembrino's troops. Adeodato managed to escape and hide in the woods while being sought by the federal troops. The War of the Contestado was finally over with his arrest in August 1916.

Adeodato was sentenced to 30 years in prison. However, in 1923, less than seven years later, Adeodato was killed by the jail warden in an alleged escape attempt.

On October 12, 1916, the state governors Filipe Schmidt (Santa Catarina) and Afonso de Camargo (Paraná) signed an agreement and the town of Campos do Irani was renamed Concórdia.

== Statistics ==
- Size of combat area: 20,000 km²
- Population living in the combat area: about 40,000 inhabitants
- Municipalities of Paraná (at the time): Rio Negro, Itaiópolis, Timbó, Três Barras, União da Vitória and Palmas
- Municipalities of Santa Catarina (at the time): Lages, Curitibanos, Campos Novos, Canoinhas and Timbó Grande

== See also ==
- Rebellions and revolutions in Brazil
- List of wars involving Brazil
