= João Maria =

João Maria may refer to:

- João Maria (monk), the name given to three lay monks who were active in southern Brazil
- João Maria de Jesus, itinerant preacher and healer
- João Maria de Sousa, attorney general of Angola
- João Maria of Orléans-Braganza, French-born Brazilian soldier, pilot and airline executive
