= José Maria de Santo Agostinho =

Brazilian monk (died 1912)

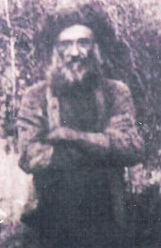
- José Maria towards the end of his life
- Born: Miguel Lucena de Boaventura; Curitiba, Brazil
- Died: 22 October 1912; Irani, Brazil
- Occupations: Soldier, monk

José Maria de Santo Agostinho, born Miguel Boaventura Lucena (died 22 October 1912), was a Brazilian religious leader from the state of Santa Catarina. He was the third of three monks named João Maria who appeared in turn in southern Brazil, preaching and healing with herbs. He was the original leader of the peasants in the unsuccessful Contestado War (1912–16), and was killed in one of the first encounters with government troops.

== Life ==
José Maria de Santo Agostinho was formerly the soldier Miguel Lucena de Boaventura. He settled in Taquaraçu, Santa Catarina, where he gained a reputation for healing powers. He resurrected a young woman thought to be dead and cured the wife of a colonel of a disease that the doctors had proclaimed uncurable. He was literate, which was unusual in among the local country people, and wrote notebooks of herbal recipes. He established a "people's pharmacy" where he would provide herbs, seeds and roots as well as prayers.

José Maria claimed to be the brother of the monk João Maria D’Agostini, an earlier religious leader in the region. He was the religious leader of the rebels during the "Contestado War" of 1912–16, in which small farmers and settlers in Paraná and Santa Catarina who had been expelled from their lands fought against the large capitalist landowners and companies. He gathered a following in the Contestado, a region between Parana and Santa Catarina, opposed to construction of a railway that would open the land to outsiders. He organized the dispossessed peasants and sharecroppers from his base at the Fazenda do Irani.

The superintendent of the municipality of Curitibanos was suspicious of José Maria and summoned him to introduce himself, which he refused to do. This was taken as an act of contempt, and the state government's security regiment marched to Taquaruçu to disperse his followers. In a clash on 22 October 1912 the troops were defeated, but José Maria, who was leading the rebels, was killed. In their religious excitement the rebels sanctified José Maria and began to call him São João Maria, thinking he would return in a few months with an enchanted army commanded by Saint Sebastian. Later the people of the region began to conflate José Maria and the earlier João Maria, uniting them as one person.

== Sources ==
- Cueto, Marcos; Palmer, Steven (2014-12-15), Medicine and Public Health in Latin America, Cambridge University Press, ISBN 978-1-107-02367-3
- Feldman, Louis H.; Hata, Gåohei (1989), Josephus, the Bible, and History, BRILL, ISBN 90-04-08931-4
- MacLachlan, Colin M. (2003), A History of Modern Brazil: The Past Against the Future, Rowman & Littlefield, ISBN 978-0-8420-5123-1
- Silva, Gabriel Ribeiro da; Kunrath, Gabriel Carvalho (2015), "Os caminhos do Monge Joao Maria no planalto meridional Brasileiro", O historiador e as novas tecnologias - reunião de artigos do II Encontro de Pesquisas Históricas - PUCRS: Evento acadêmico - História - Encontro - Pós-graduação - Graduação – PUCRS (in Portuguese), Memorial do Ministério Público do Rio Grande do Sul, ISBN 978-85-88802-22-3
