= Michael McGarrity =

American novelist

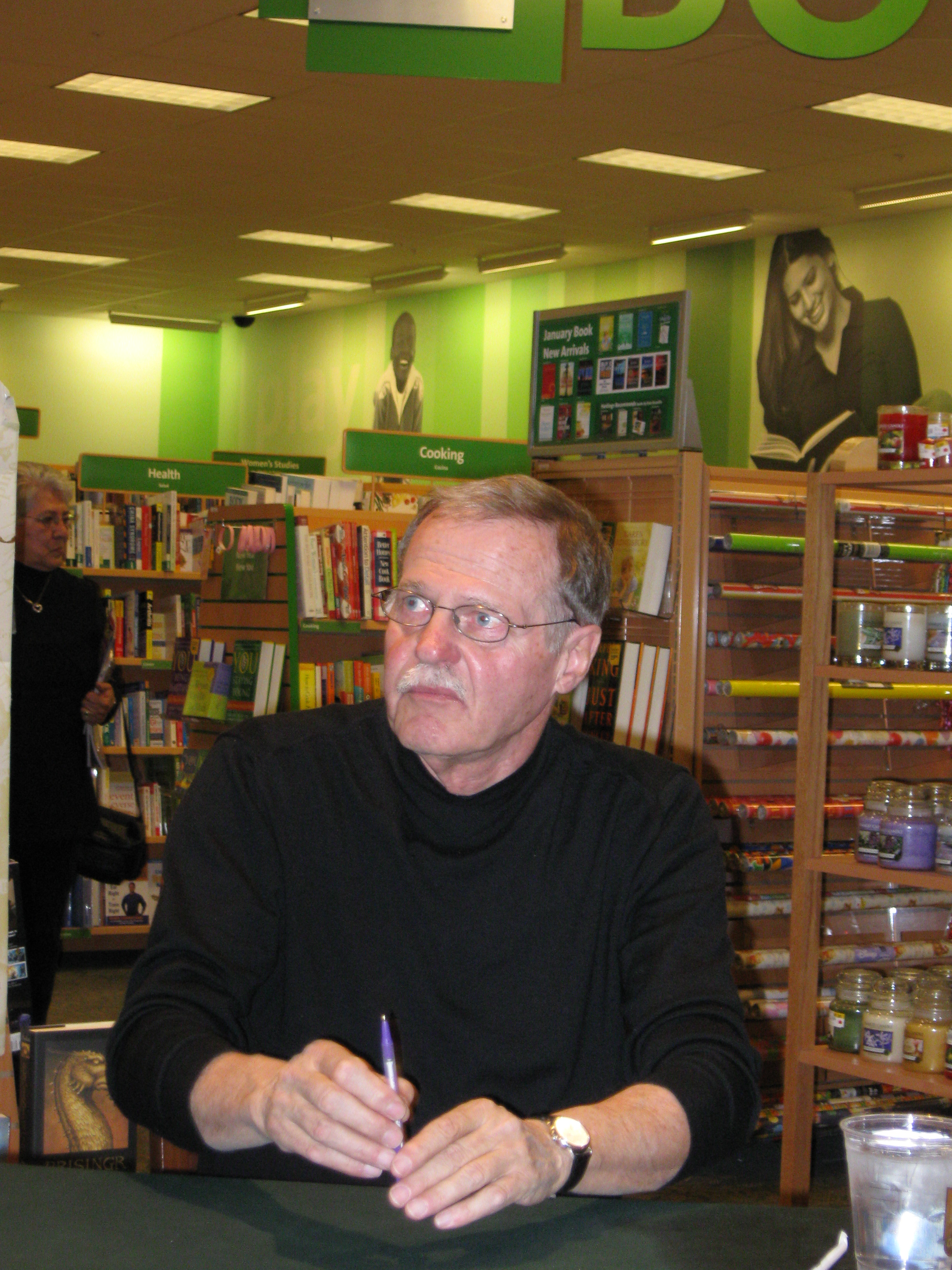
Michael McGarrity in 2009

Michael McGarrity (born 1940) is a New Mexican author and former law enforcement officer. He has written a dozen crime novels set in New Mexico and the American West trilogy, historical novels also set in New Mexico consisting of Hard Country, Backlands and The Last Ranch. As deputy sheriff of Santa Fe County he founded their sex crimes unit.

== Early life ==
McGarrity attended the University of New Mexico for three years and graduated from San Jose State University with a Bachelor's degree with distinction in English and Psychology. He earned a Master's degree in clinical social work from the University of Iowa and is a graduate of the New Mexico Law Enforcement academy.

== Career ==
=== Legal career and nonfiction writing ===
In addition to law enforcement work, he has been an investigator and caseworker for the New Mexico Public Defender's Office. He worked on rehabilitating prison programs after the New Mexico State Penitentiary riot in 1980. McGarrity has taught at several colleges and universities as well as the New Mexico Law Enforcement Academy. As a social worker he published a number of articles in professional journals on a wide range of topics, ranging from therapy programs for children, to program assessment and evaluation, and drug treatment interventions.

=== Fiction writing ===
McGarrity's crime novels take place in modern New Mexico, with law enforcement officer Kevin Kerney as the protagonist. The settings are vividly evoked and range from the Tularosa Basin and Lincoln County to Hermit's Peak, although many take place in Santa Fe. Hard Country, Backlands, and The Last Ranch form a sweeping trilogy tracing the Kerney family's history in New Mexico from 1875 through the end of the Vietnam War. A ground breaking prequel trilogy, all three books are set on the Tularosa Basin of south central New Mexico.

== Awards ==
McGarrity has been nominated three times for the Western Writers of America Spur Award for Best Western Novel as well as an Anthony Award for his debut novel, Tularosa.

He has received the following awards:

- New Mexico Social Worker of the Year, 1980
- Santa Fe's Police Officer of the Year, 1987
- New Mexico Governor's Award for Excellence in the Arts — Literature, 2004
- Santa Fe Mayor's Award for Excellence in the Arts - Literature, 2015
- Frank Waters Exemplary Literary Achievement Award, 2015

== Bibliography ==
=== Kevin Kerney series ===
- Tularosa (1996) — White Sands Missile Range, Tularosa Basin
- Mexican Hat (1997) — Gila Wilderness in southwestern New Mexico
- Serpent Gate (1998) — Mountainair and Santa Fe
- Hermit's Peak (1999) — Hermit's Peak and Las Vegas, New Mexico
- The Judas Judge (2000) — Central and southeastern New Mexico
- Under the Color of Law (2001) — Santa Fe and western New Mexico
- The Big Gamble (2002) — Lincoln and Santa Fe counties
- Everyone Dies (2003) — Santa Fe
- Slow Kill (2004) — California and New Mexico
- Nothing But Trouble (2005) — Bootheel, the extreme southwestern New Mexico
- Death Song (2007) — Lincoln County and Santa Fe
- Dead or Alive (2008) — Northeastern New Mexico
- Residue (2018) — Southwestern New Mexico
- Head Wounds (2020) - Las Cruces, New Mexico

=== American West Trilogy books ===
- Hard Country (2012)
- Backlands (2014)
- The Last Ranch (2016)

=== Stand-alones ===
- The Long Ago (2023)
