= João Maria D'Agostini =

Italian lay monk (1801–1869)

João Maria D’Agostini
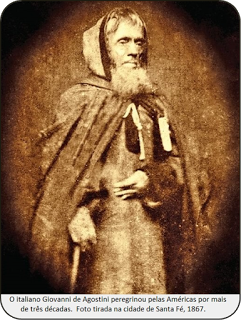
- Giovanni de Agostini in Santa Fe, 1867
- Born: Giovanni Maria de Agostini; 1801; Sizzano, Piemont, Italy
- Died: 17 April 1869 (aged 67–68); Las Cruces, New Mexico, US
- Occupations: Wandering preacher, healer

João Maria D'Agostini, or Giovanni Maria de Agostini (1801 – 17 April 1869), was a lay monk of Italian origin who travelled widely in South and North America preaching and healing with herbal remedies. He drew large crowds who believed that he was a holy man who could work miracles, although the authorities often viewed him with suspicion.

In Brazil, his devotees have conflated his identity with two other monks named João Maria. Thousands of people each year visit a cave in the state of Paraná, Brazil, where he once lived.

== Early years (1801–1843) ==
Giovanni de Agostini was born into a noble family in 1801 in Sizzano, Piedmont, Italy. After his mother died in 1819, he made a pilgrimage to Rome, and then to France and Spain. He tried to become a monk, but was unable to accept the secluded life of the monastery. He decided to become an evangelist in America and arrived in Caracas, Venezuela, in June 1838. He then travelled in Venezuela, Colombia, Ecuador, Peru and finally Brazil.

== Brazil (1843–1852) ==
Agostini lived in Brazil from 1843 to 1852 under the name of João Maria. He visited the cities of Rio de Janeiro, São Paulo, Curitiba, Florianópolis (then called Desterro) and Porto Alegre. In each place, he obtained authorization from the bishop and president of the province to preach the gospel before leaving for the interior to conduct his missionary work. Dressed in the habit of a Capuchin friar, he wore sandals and carried religious objects such as a Bible, medals of Our Lady and a staff.

Agostini knew the Gospel well, had a good understanding of theology and was fluent in French and Latin. He gave apocalyptic sermons in which he condemned luxury and avarice, warned of the day of judgement and the torments of hell, and spoke of the possibilities of salvation. Like other Capuchins, he established cruzeiros or sacred ways where the faithful could make penitential processions to reduce their debt to God. Agostini made rosaries and wooden crucifixes, which he sold for cash or bartered in order to support his mission. He made medicines from herbs, roots, leaves and water from special sources. He gained a reputation as a saint who could perform miracles and drew large crowds.

During his stay in Rio Grande do Sul between 1846 and 1848, he was visited by crowds of patients and others curious to see him, including some who came from Uruguay, Argentina and Paraguay. Although João Maria was not a revolutionary, he tried to improve the condition of the peasants. He organized processions, built chapels, blessed cattle and baptized children. He cared for the sick, and his herbal teas became famous.

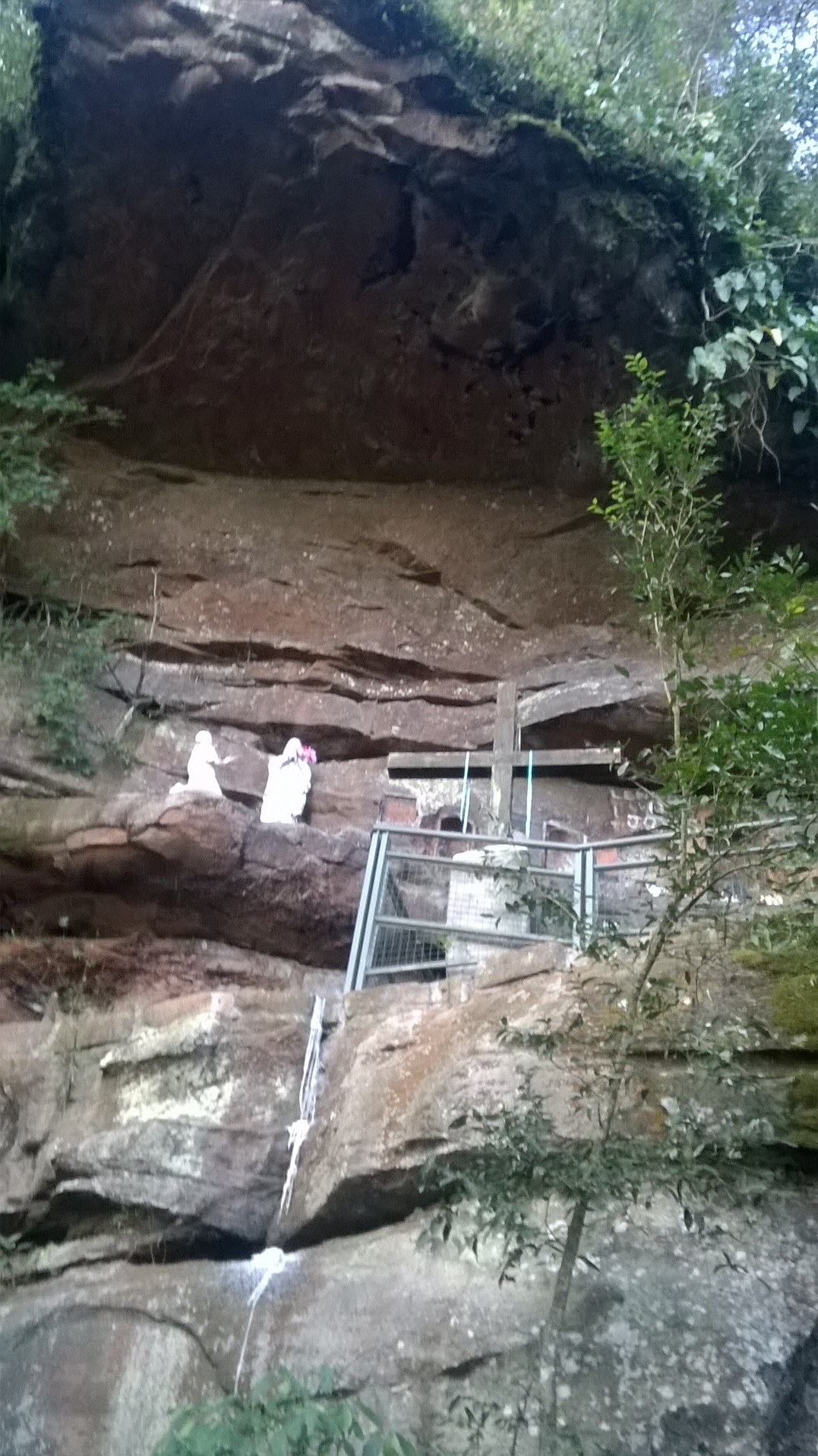
The monk's cave in Monge State Park near Lapa, Paraná

There are records from 1844 of João Maria going from Pará to Rio de Janeiro, where he became famous as a healer and counsellor. He moved to Sorocaba, São Paulo, and continued to practice medicine and give advice. João Maria left the city of São Paulo and disappeared for a time before showing up in Rio Grande do Sul.

Thousands of people came to him at Cerro Campestre, in Santa Maria, Rio Grande do Sul, drawn by word of the miraculous power of his waters. The authorities of Rio Grande do Sul analyzed the water and found it was potable but no different from any other water. He then continued through Santa Catarina and Paraná, where he lived in a cave near Lapa in 1847. There he performed marriages, baptisms, healings and gave blessings to the local people.

In 1848, João Maria was deported to Santa Catarina, then to Rio de Janeiro, where he was lost from sight for a while. He met Father Joaquim Gomes de Oliveira e Paiva, deputy provincial of Santa Catarina, in February 1849 on Arvoredo Island. The father spoke highly of him, and perhaps as a result, the Emperor Pedro II of Brazil gave him an audience and offered him gifts and favours which, as a mendicant, he could not use. The emperor's favour may have offered him protection when charges were later laid against him of charlatanism, illegal medicine, false promises of cure and religious imposture.

== Later career (1853–1869) ==
In 1852, Agostini moved to Monte Palma in Paraguay, now called El Cerro del Monje and now in the Misiones Province of Argentina. The next year, he was in Buenos Aires, then crossed the Andes to Chile, where he lived from 1854 to 1856. He was in Bolivia in 1857, Peru in 1858, Mexico in 1859, Cuba in 1860 and Canada in 1861. Because he drew large crowds from time to time, the activities of this foreign religious leader often roused the suspicions of the authorities.

Agostini reached the United States in 1861 and walked for almost 1,000 kilometres (620 mi) to New Mexico. He lived on a mountain later named for him, Hermit's Peak, near Las Vegas, New Mexico. In 1867, he moved to a cave near the town of Las Cruces, although the residents warned him that the Indians were dangerous. He lived there for two years, sometimes coming down to the village to preach, treat the sick and catechize children.

According to a plaque in the cave east of Las Cruces, New Mexico, where he spent his final two years, he told the people nearby that he'd light a fire every Friday night to let them know he was still alive. In April 1869, the villagers noted the absence of his fire, went up to his cave to investigate, and discovered that he had been killed. His murderer was never found. He had died on 17 April 1869 at the age of 69.

João Maria's tomb may still be seen in New Mexico.

== Legacy ==
João Maria D'Agostini inspired others who became mendicants in Brazil in the following decades, and was the first of the three "monks" named João Maria in southern Brazil.

Some widely distributed photographs with the legend "Jõao Maria de Agostinho Propheta" are actually pictures of a later monk, João Maria de Jesus.

Even now, some people believe that João Maria still wanders in the region and works his miracles. There are many sites in the center and east of Paraná and Santa Catarina, the south of São Paulo and the north of Rio Grande do Sul, where a small altar or cross marks a place where one of the "João Marias" would have passed.

The Monge State Park was created in Lapa in 1960. An important feature is the monk's cave, which is a place of religious pilgrimage for thousands of faithful people. It also includes a source of water that is considered to be miraculous.

Hermit Peak, a mountain in San Miguel County, New Mexico, is named for him.

== Sources ==
- Cueto, Marcos; Palmer, Steven (15 December 2014), Medicine and Public Health in Latin America, Cambridge University Press, ISBN 978-1-107-02367-3
- Feldman, Louis H.; Hata, Gåohei (1989), Josephus, the Bible, and History, BRILL, ISBN 90-04-08931-4
- Karsburg, Alexandre de Oliveira (1 October 2012), Assim caminhou João Maria (in Portuguese), Revista de História da Biblioteca Nacional
- Kubaski, Derek (25 May 2012), "Os monges "Joões Marias" de um Paraná caboclo", Gazeta do Povo (in Portuguese)
- Lapa: Parque Estadual do Monge - Gruta do Monge (in Portuguese), Paraná Turismo, archived from the original on 1 October 2016
- Olhos d'água do monge João Maria: Paraná Turismo avalia criação de rota turística em Prudentópolis (in Portuguese), Prefeitura de Prudentópolis, 2 December 2015
- Silva, Gabriel Ribeiro da; Kunrath, Gabriel Carvalho (2015), "Os caminhos do Monge Joao Maria no planalto meridional Brasileiro", O historiador e as novas tecnologias - reunião de artigos do II Encontro de Pesquisas Históricas - PUCRS: Evento acadêmico - História - Encontro - Pós-graduação - Graduação – PUCRS (in Portuguese), Memorial do Ministério Público do Rio Grande do Sul, ISBN 978-85-88802-22-3
- Welter, Tania (17 September 2007), "O Profeta São João Maria Continua Encantando no Meio do Povo" (PDF) (thesis) (in Portuguese), Florianapolis: Universidade Federal de Santa Catarina
