= Hermit Peak =

Mountain in New Mexico, United States

Hermit's Peak
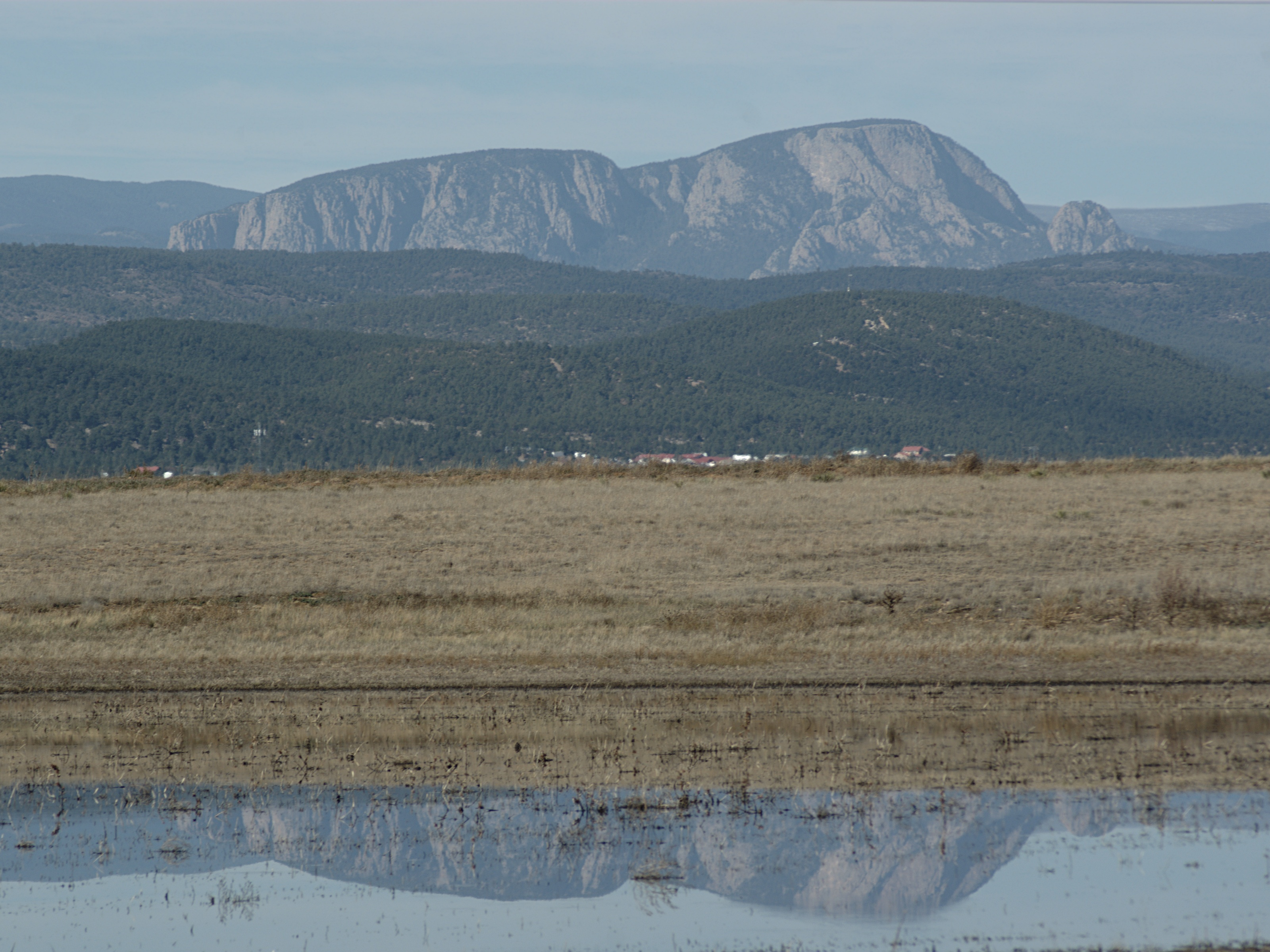
- Looking west from Las Vegas National Wildlife Refuge

Highest point
- Elevation: 10,267 ft (3,129 m) NAVD 88
- Prominence: 1,040 ft (320 m)
- Coordinates: 35°44′39″N 105°24′54″W

Geography
- Location: San Miguel County, New Mexico, U.S.
- Parent range: Sangre de Cristo Mountains
- Topo map: USGS El Porvenir

Climbing
- Easiest route: 9.5-mile trail from El Porvenir Trailhead

Hermit's Peak is a mountain in San Miguel County, in northern New Mexico, United States.

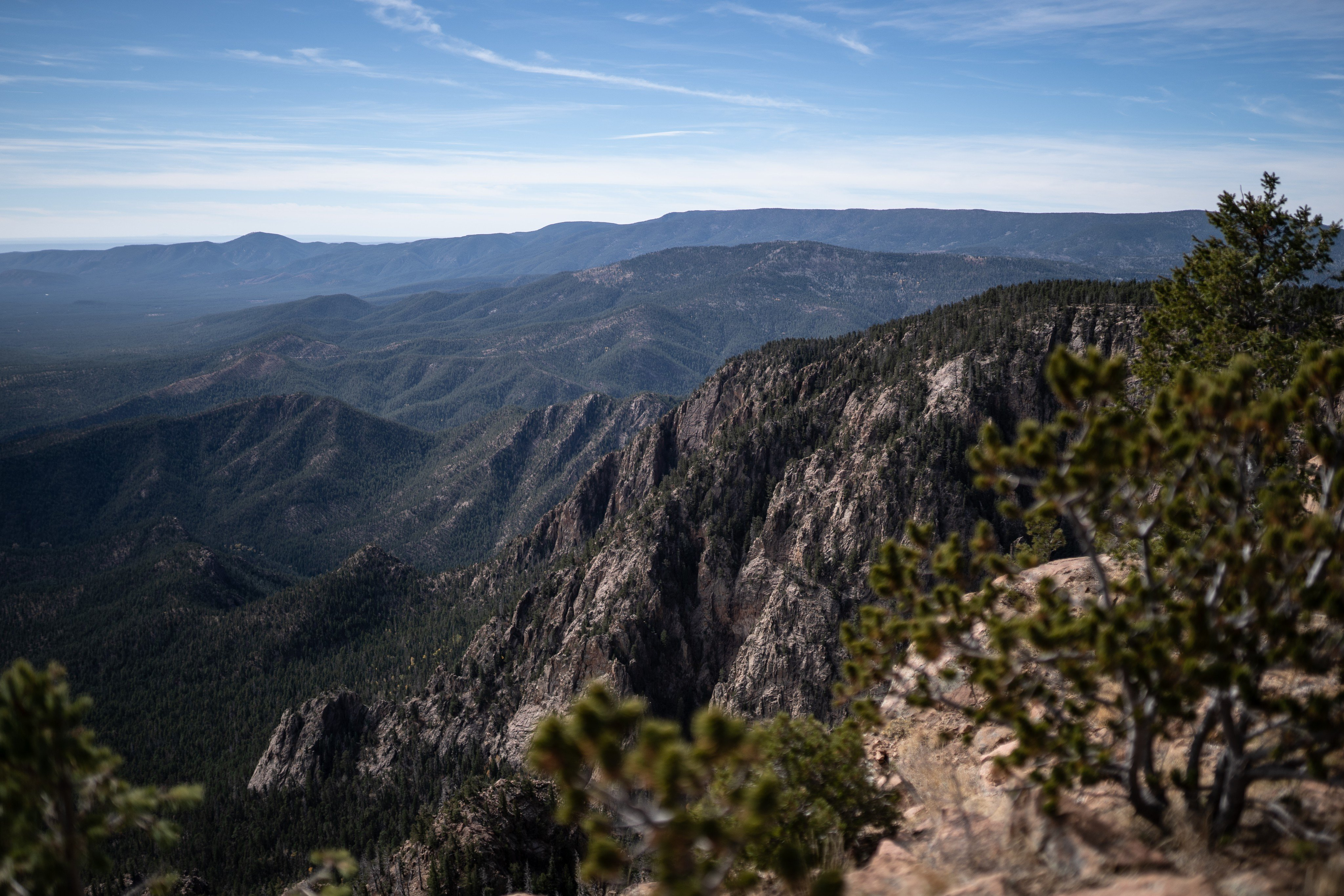
Looking South from Hermit's Peak, Pecos Wilderness, Santa Fe National Forest

The peak is named for the Italian religious recluse Giovanni Maria de Agostini, who lived in a cave on a narrow ledge on the southeast side of the mountain about one hundred feet below the summit rim. The cave could only be reached by descending from above. The cave roof was too low to allow Agostini to stand erect. To help shut out the elements and to protect himself from the sheer drop below, Agostini built a rock wall around the mouth of the cave. Agostini lived in the cave from August 1863 to May 1866. His cave became the subject of pilgrimage by some devout New Mexicans during his life and for a number of years after his death.

The Peak is in the Santa Fe National Forest, and the trail to the peak is maintained by the Pecos/Las Vegas Ranger District. The trail to the top is approximately four miles from the El Porvenir Campground.

From El Porvenir, Hermit's Peak has rocky features that seem to form a man's face looking to the sky. Left to right, one sees a forehead, eye, nose, two lips, and a chin. The rugged trail to the top of the "nose" winds through the "eye." The view from the tip of the "nose" is said to include five states. There is a rock overhang known as "Hermit's Cave" on the "nose."

The area was impacted by the Calf Canyon/Hermits Peak Fire, the largest in state history, in 2022.

== Literature ==
Hermit Peak is the location for Michael McGarrity's suspense novel Hermit's Peak.
