= João Maria (monk) =

- Died: 1869, 1908, 1912
- Occupation: Lay monks
- Known for: Apocalyptic preaching Herbal cures Peasants' revolt

João Maria was the name given to three lay monks who were in turn active in southern Brazil during the second half of the 19th century and early 20th century, although two originally had other names and the third was only called João Maria after his death. They were all ascetic wanderers and preachers who healed with herbs. The third led a peasant revolt in 1912. Their followers think they were the same person in different incarnations, a saint. The Monge State Park (Note: The Monge State Park is named after the first monk (Portuguese: Monge João Maria).) maintains a cave where the first monk once lived, visited by thousands of pilgrims annually.

== João Maria D’Agostini ==
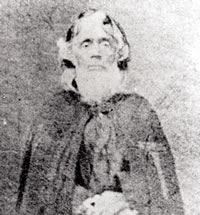
João Maria D’Agostini in 1861

The first João Maria was born in Piedmont, Italy. As a young man he entered the seminary in Rome, but left before being ordained priest. He wandered in Europe, then came to South America where he travelled in Venezuela, Colombia, Ecuador, Peru and finally Brazil. There are records from 1844 of João Maria going from Pará to Rio de Janeiro, where he became famous as a healer and counselor. He moved to Sorocaba and continued to practice medicine and give advice.

João Maria left the city of São Paulo and disappeared for a while before showing up in Rio Grande do Sul. Thousands of people came to him at Cerro Campestre, in Santa Maria, Rio Grande do Sul, drawn by word of the miraculous power of his waters. The authorities of Rio Grande do Sul analyzed the water and found it was potable but no different from any other water. He then continued through Santa Catarina and Paraná, where he lived in a cave near Lapa in 1847. There he performed marriages, baptisms, healings and gave blessings to the local people. João Maria was not a revolutionary, but tried to improve the condition of the peasants. He organized processions, built chapels, blessed cattle and baptized children. He cared for the sick, and his herbal teas became famous.

In 1848 João Maria was deported to Santa Catarina, then to Rio de Janeiro, where he was lost from sight for a while. He reappeared in Buenos Aires in 1853 and walked through Bolivia and all of south and central America until 1861, arriving in New Mexico in the United States in 1862, where he lived in the mountains. He was assassinated there on 17 April 1869 at the age of 69. His tomb may be seen in New Mexico.

== João Maria de Jesus ==
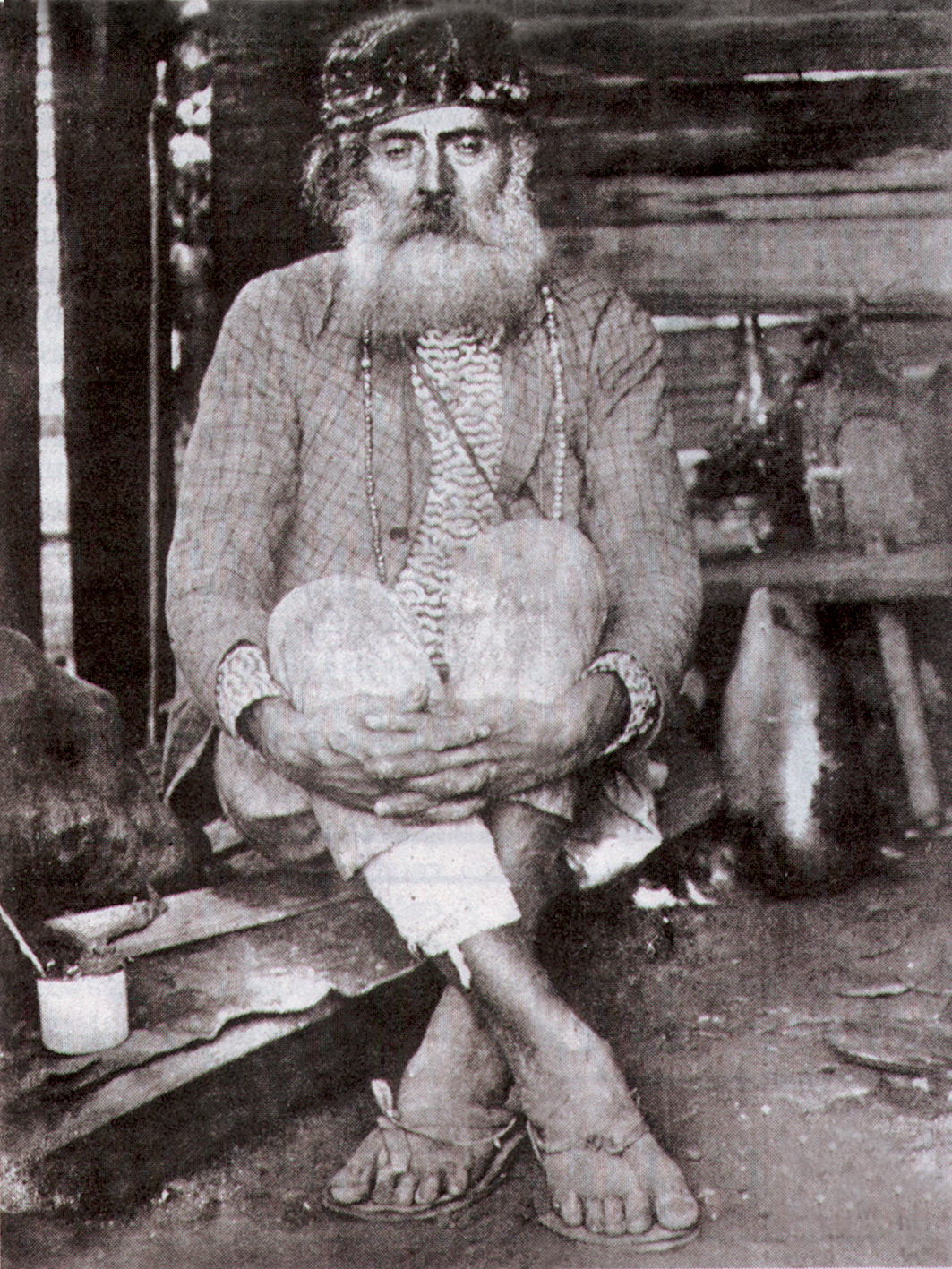
João Maria de Jesus in 1898

In 1890 João Maria de Jesus began to travel in southern Brazil. His appearance, with a long white beard, and way of life were similar to Agostini. João Maria de Jesus was famous as a healer, and his medicine was thought to be miraculous. It was said he could cure a person simply by praying for their health and prescribing a tea from a common herb called "monk's broom". He was quoted as saying, "He who does not know how to read the book of nature is illiterate in God's eyes." His devotees thought that all objects or places that he touched became sacred, and would provide the hermit's blessings after he had disappeared.

During the Federalist Revolution of 1893–95 he attended wounded rebels. His teachings were prophetic and apocalyptic. He said God would punish mankind with plagues of insects and bloody wars. He thought the First Brazilian Republic of 1889 was the work of the devil, and defended restoration of the monarchy as the "order of God". He may have died in 1908 in hospital in Ponta Grossa, Paraná, or may be buried in Lagoa Vermelha, Rio Grande do Sul, but his devotees think he is still living in the Morro Taió, a hill in Santa Catarina.

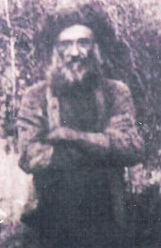
José Maria de Santo Agostinho

== José Maria de Santo Agostinho ==
José Maria de Santo Agostinho was formerly the soldier Miguel Lucena de Boaventura. He settled in Taquaraçu, Santa Catarina, where he gained a reputation for healing powers. He established a "people's pharmacy" where he would provide herbs, seeds and roots as well as prayers. José Maria claimed to be the first João Maria's brother. He was the religious leader of the rebels during the "Contestado War" of 1912–16, in which small farmers and settlers in Paraná and Santa Catarina who had been expelled from their lands fought against the large capitalist landowners and companies. He organized the dispossessed peasants and sharecroppers from his base at the Fazenda do Irani.

The state government's security regiment marched to Taquaruçu to disperse his followers. In a clash on 22 October 1912 the troops were defeated, but José Maria, who was leading the rebels, was killed. In their religious excitement the rebels sanctified José Maria and began to call him São João Maria, thinking he would return in a few months with an enchanted army commanded by Saint Sebastian.

== Legacy ==
The people of the region began to conflate José Maria and the João Marias, uniting them as one person. A socio-religious movement led by André Ferreira França began in Soledade, Rio Grande do Sul, in 1935. The group was persecuted and André França decided to withdraw, but was shot in a clash with the city's military brigade.

There is a large literature about the monks called João Maria, but the devout population have little interest in their historicity and are much more concerned with the sacred characteristics attributed to them. There are people today who think that João Maria, now more than 200 years old, still wanders in the region and works his miracles. There are many places in the center and east of Paraná and Santa Catarina, the south of São Paulo and the north of Rio Grande do Sul, where a small altar or cross marks a place where one of the "João Marias" would have passed.

The various wanderers recognized as the monk or prophet João Maria all have strong similarities. They are pilgrims, without home or family. They have withdrawn from the pleasures of the world to do penance by serving God. They preach the Apocalypse, when God will punish all sinners. They have the miraculous power of healing, and they are immortal.

The Monge State Park was created in Lapa in 1960. The main attraction is the monk's cave, a place of religious pilgrimage for thousands of faithful. It includes a source of water that it considered to be miraculous. In 2015 Paraná Turismo was considering definition of a tourist circuit to visit the olhos d'água in places where the monk was present. As of December 2015 the secretariat of tourism had identified 38 municipalities where the monk was present.

== Sources ==
- Alves, Robinson Fernando (January–June 2010), "O Monge João Maria de Agostinho em Campestre, Santa Maria: Aspectos Históricos", Debates do NER (in Portuguese), 11 (17), Porto Alegre
- Cueto, Marcos; Palmer, Steven (2014-12-15), Medicine and Public Health in Latin America, Cambridge University Press, ISBN 978-1-107-02367-3
- Feldman, Louis H.; Hata, Gåohei (1989), Josephus, the Bible, and History, BRILL, ISBN 90-04-08931-4
- Kubaski, Derek (25 May 2012), "Os monges "Joões Marias" de um Paraná caboclo", Gazeta do Povo (in Portuguese)
- Lapa: Parque Estadual do Monge - Gruta do Monge (in Portuguese), Paraná Turismo, archived from the original on 2016-10-01
- Olhos d'água do monge João Maria: Paraná Turismo avalia criação de rota turística em Prudentópolis (in Portuguese), Prefeitura de Prudentópolis, 2 December 2015
- Silva, Gabriel Ribeiro da; Kunrath, Gabriel Carvalho (2015), "Os caminhos do Monge Joao Maria no planalto meridional Brasileiro", O historiador e as novas tecnologias - reunião de artigos do II Encontro de Pesquisas Históricas - PUCRS: Evento acadêmico - História - Encontro - Pós-graduação - Graduação – PUCRS (in Portuguese), Memorial do Ministério Público do Rio Grande do Sul, ISBN 978-85-88802-22-3
- Welter, Tania (17 September 2007), "O Profeta São João Maria Continua Encantando no Meio do Povo" (PDF) (thesis) (in Portuguese), Florianapolis: Universidade Federal de Santa Catarina
