= Irani, Santa Catarina =

Municipality in Santa Catarina, Brazil

Coordinates: 27°01′30″S 51°54′07″W

- Municipality
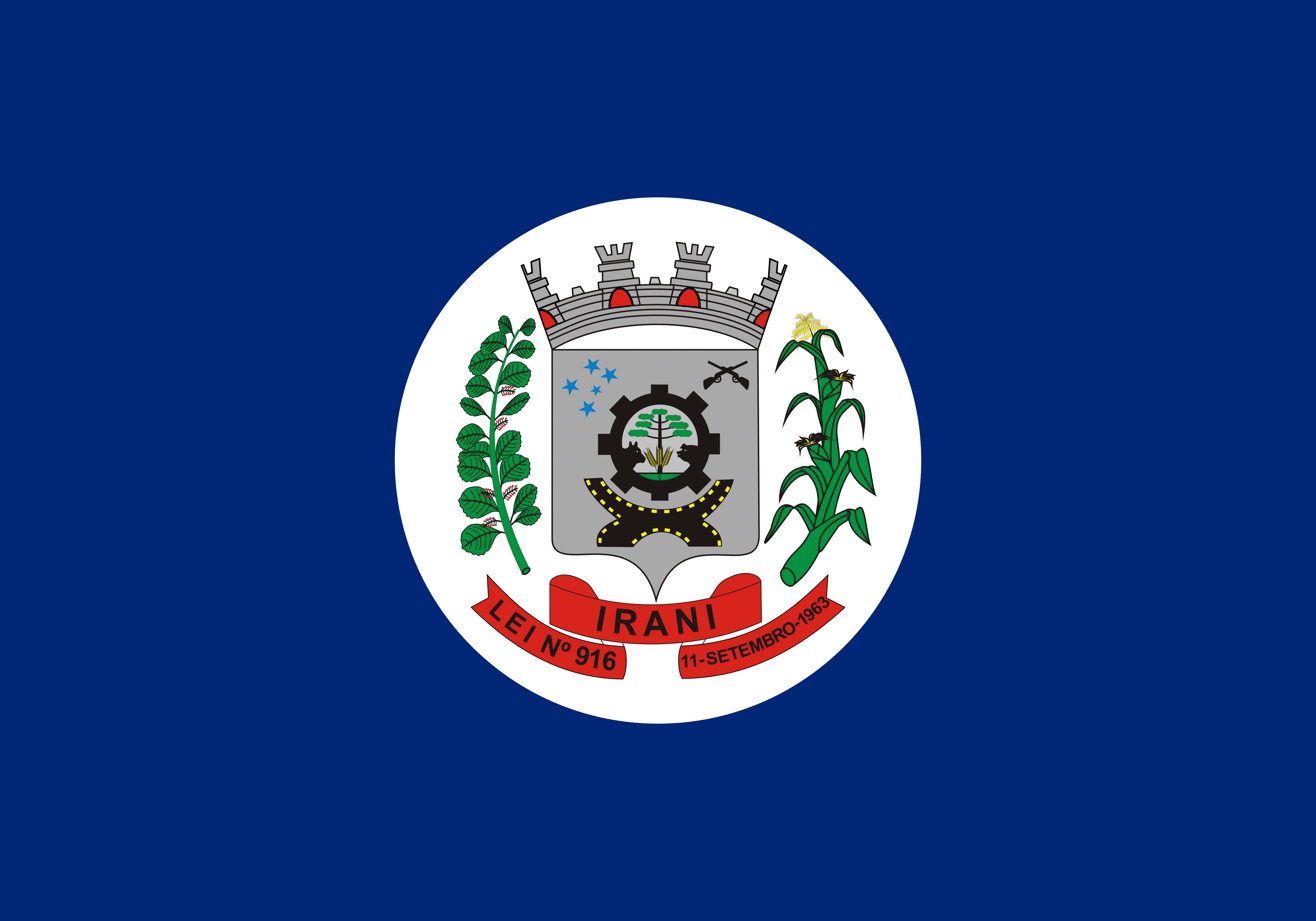
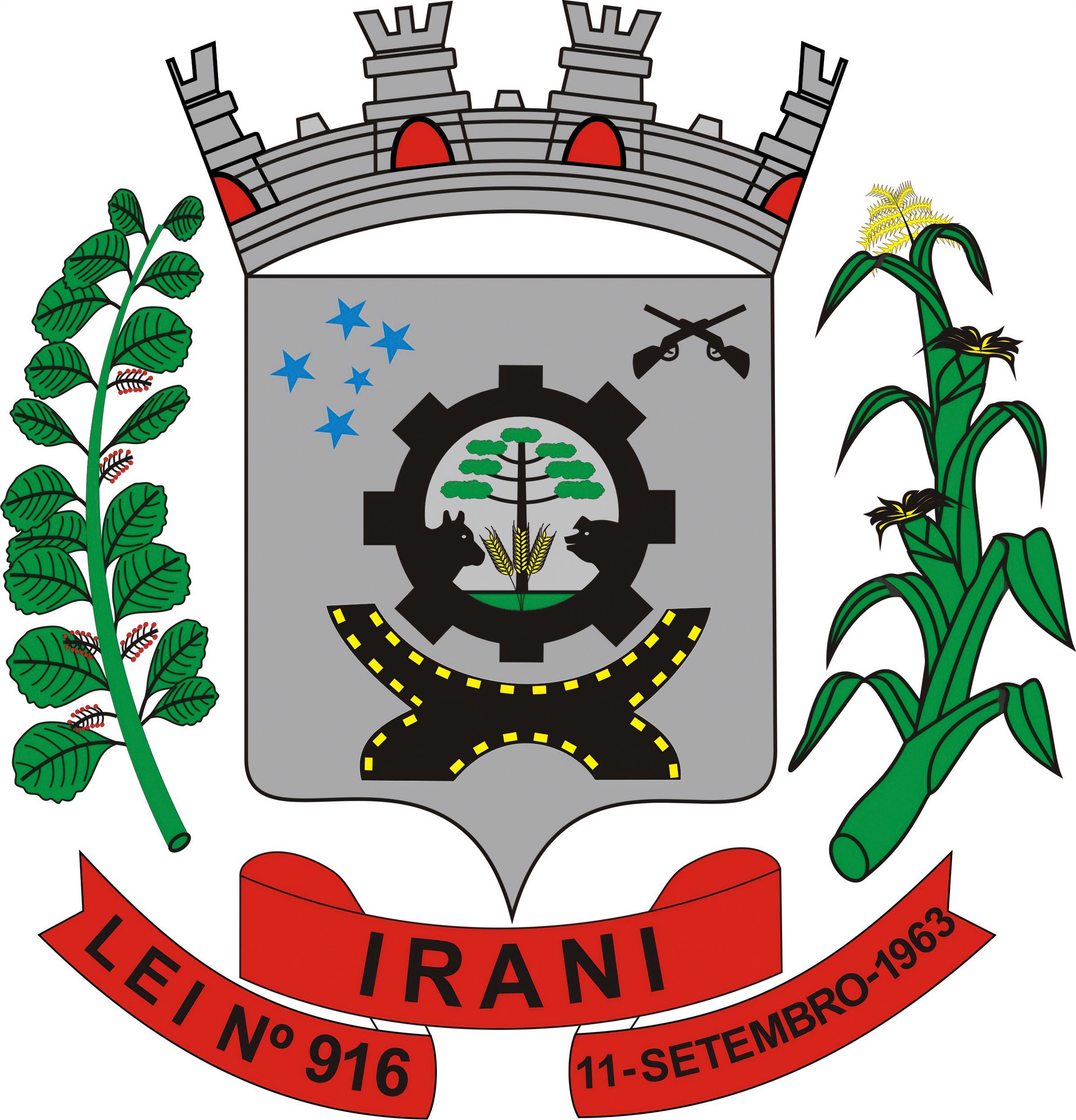
- Flag Coat of arms
- Interactive map of Irani, Santa Catarina
- Country: Brazil
- Time zone: UTC−3 (BRT)

Irani is a municipality situated in the state of Santa Catarina, Brazil, with an estimated population in 2020 of 10,498 inhabitants. It is located in 27º01'29" S and 51º54'06" W and 1,047 m above sea level.
