= Palmas, Paraná =

Palmas
- City
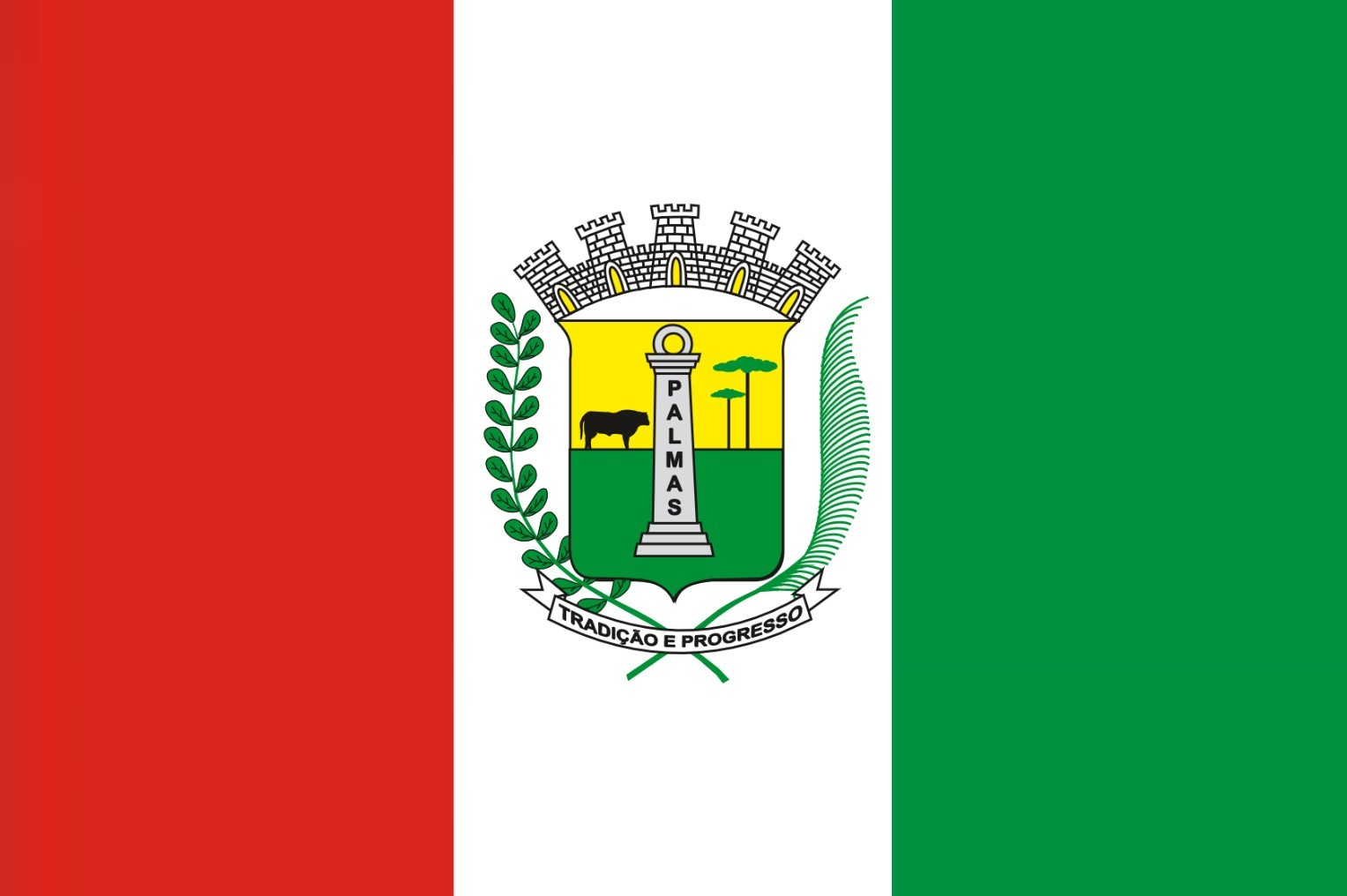
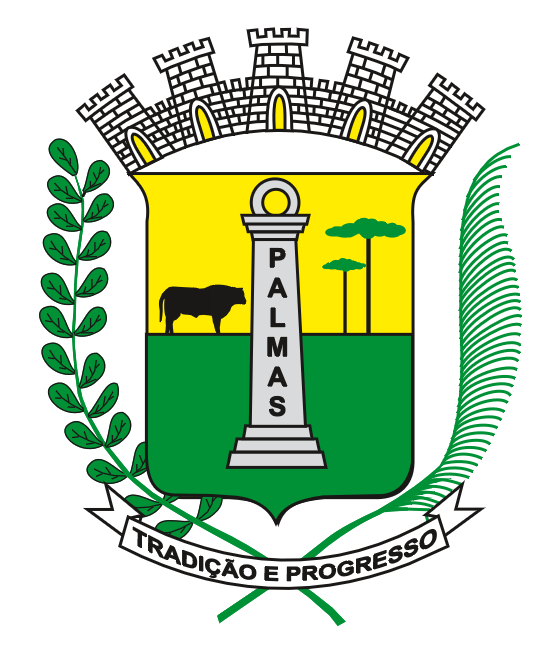
- Flag Coat of arms

- Location within Brazil
- Coordinates: 26°29′3″S 51°59′26″W
- Country: Brazil
- State: Paraná
- Meso-Region: Southcentral Paraná (Central-Sul do Paraná)
- Micro-Region: Palma
- Founded: 1877

Area
  - Total: 1,557.90 km^{2} (601.51 sq mi)
- Elevation: 1,035 m (3,396 ft)

Population (2020)
  - Total: 51,755
  - Density: 33.221/km^{2} (86.042/sq mi)
- Time zone: UTC−3 (BRT)
- Postal code: 85555-xxx
- Area code: 4x

Palmas is a municipality in the south of the Brazilian state of Paraná. Palmas is located in the mountainous area of Paraná and is in the mesoregion of South-Central Paraná. Palmas is the capital of the microregion of the same name. The population is 51,755 (2020 est.) in an area of 1557.90 km^{2}. The elevation is 1,056 m.

== Climate ==
Climate data for Palmas, Paraná, elevation 1,100 m (3,600 ft), (1979–2017)
Month	Jan	Feb	Mar	Apr	May	Jun	Jul	Aug	Sep	Oct	Nov	Dec	Year
Record high °C (°F)	32.2 (90.0)	32.6 (90.7)	32.4 (90.3)	30.0 (86.0)	28.2 (82.8)	28.0 (82.4)	27.0 (80.6)	29.6 (85.3)	31.6 (88.9)	32.6 (90.7)	34.4 (93.9)	32.4 (90.3)	34.4 (93.9)
Mean daily maximum °C (°F)	26.5 (79.7)	26.0 (78.8)	25.3 (77.5)	22.9 (73.2)	19.3 (66.7)	18.1 (64.6)	18.1 (64.6)	20.4 (68.7)	21.0 (69.8)	23.0 (73.4)	24.7 (76.5)	25.8 (78.4)	22.6 (72.7)
Daily mean °C (°F)	20.3 (68.5)	20.2 (68.4)	19.1 (66.4)	16.8 (62.2)	13.3 (55.9)	12.1 (53.8)	11.8 (53.2)	13.6 (56.5)	14.6 (58.3)	16.9 (62.4)	18.4 (65.1)	19.8 (67.6)	16.4 (61.5)
Mean daily minimum °C (°F)	16.0 (60.8)	16.2 (61.2)	15.0 (59.0)	12.8 (55.0)	9.3 (48.7)	8.0 (46.4)	7.5 (45.5)	8.8 (47.8)	10.0 (50.0)	12.4 (54.3)	13.6 (56.5)	15.2 (59.4)	12.1 (53.7)
Record low °C (°F)	6.2 (43.2)	6.2 (43.2)	2.4 (36.3)	−1.0 (30.2)	−2.6 (27.3)	−6.8 (19.8)	−6.4 (20.5)	−5.1 (22.8)	−3.4 (25.9)	−1.4 (29.5)	3.2 (37.8)	4.4 (39.9)	−6.8 (19.8)
Average precipitation mm (inches)	181.8 (7.16)	180.6 (7.11)	146.4 (5.76)	172.8 (6.80)	193.5 (7.62)	178.9 (7.04)	156.7 (6.17)	128.2 (5.05)	181.8 (7.16)	258.5 (10.18)	169.3 (6.67)	193.6 (7.62)	2,142.1 (84.34)
Average precipitation days (≥ 1.0 mm)	15	15	12	10	10	10	10	8	11	14	12	14	141
Average relative humidity (%)	79	80	79	80	82	81	78	73	74	76	73	76	78
Mean monthly sunshine hours	210.8	183.8	206.0	182.5	173.4	163.6	186.8	206.9	180.5	191.6	219.7	210.7	2,316.3
Source: IDR-Paraná
