= João Maria de Jesus =

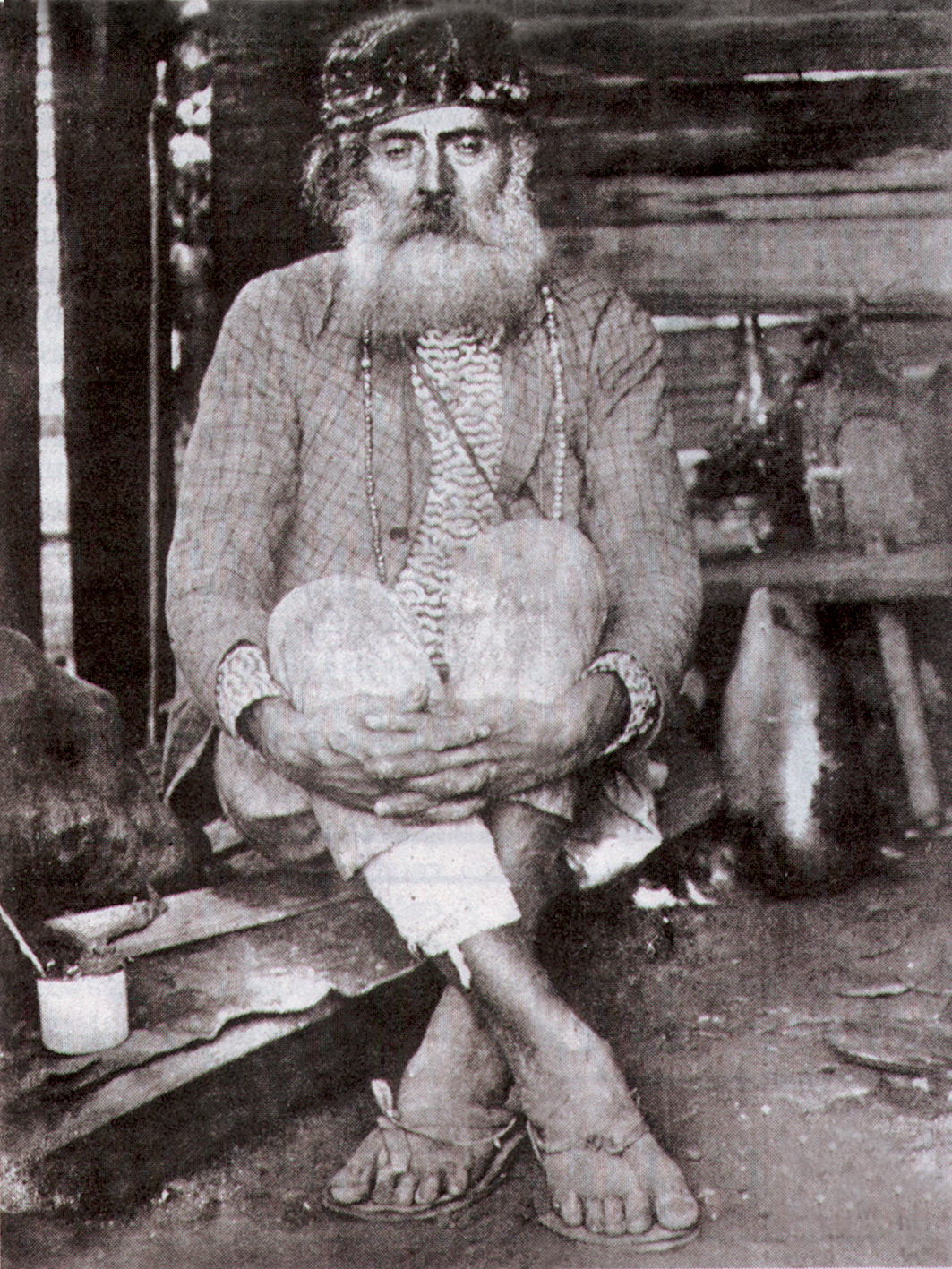
- The monk João Maria in 1898
- Born: Anastás Marcaf; Syria
- Disappeared: c. 1908; Brazil
- Occupation: Monk
- Known for: Healing, prophesy

João Maria de Jesus, born Anastás Marcaf (disappeared c. 1908) was an itinerant preacher and healer who was active in southern Brazil around the end of the 19th century and start of the 20th century. After his death his devotees conflated his identity with two other monks named João Maria who wandered, preached and cured in the region. There are many places where a small cross or altar marks a place where the monk "João Maria" stopped. There are many who think that João Maria is still working his miracles today.

== Life ==
João Maria de Jesus was originally named Anastás Marcaf. He was probably a Syrian of Greek ancestry. He arrived in Brazil from Argentina in 1886. (Note: Other sources say Anastás Marcaf may have come from France, and his name may have been Atanás Markaf.) When asked where he came from he said he was born in the sea and raised in Buenos Aires. One legend about João Maria de Jesus is that he abandoned the Christian religion to marry a pagan, and fought the French expeditionary army. After his wife's death he was made a prisoner, managed to escape, and had a vision of the apostle Paul who sent him on a pilgrimage for 14 (or perhaps 40) years as penance. Other legends held that he had committed some crime, or had seduced a nun, and as penance had to wander alone in the back country.

In the 1890s João Maria de Jesus began to wander in southern Brazil. He said he had a dream that he would walk the world for fourteen years without eating meat on Wednesdays, Fridays or Saturdays, and without staying in anyone's house. João Maria de Jesus's appearance, with a long white beard, and way of life were similar to João Maria D'Agostini, who had preached and healed in the region earlier. He followed a similar path to D'Agostini, and blessed several sources of water. He assumed the first monk's names and sanctity as a means to gain credibility among the people, but never claimed that he was a reincarnation of the first João Maria.

During the Federalist Revolution of 1893–95 João Maria de Jesus attended wounded rebels. His teachings were prophetic and apocalyptic. He said God would punish mankind with plagues of insects and bloody wars. He thought the First Brazilian Republic of 1889 was the work of the devil, and defended restoration of the monarchy as the "order of God". The doctor and federalist colonel Angelo Dourado met João Maria, who claimed to have foreseen the present war, and said the republicans were animated by the devil, and had strength and money, but the others would win even without arms.

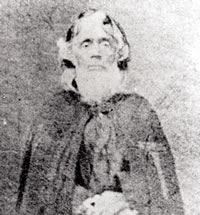
The earlier João Maria D'Agostini, whom João Maria de Jesus was said to resemble

João Maria de Jesus became famous as a healer, and his medicine was thought to be miraculous. It was said he could cure a person simply by praying for their health and prescribing a tea from a common herb called "monk's broom". He was quoted as saying, "He who does not know how to read the book of nature is illiterate in God's eyes." His devotees thought that all objects or places that he touched became sacred, and would provide the hermit's blessings after he had disappeared. João Maria de Jesus avoided gatherings of followers, and did not spend long in one place, so was less of a hermit than the first João Maria. He performed sacraments such as baptism despite being a layman, which caused conflicts with the clergy.

João Maria de Jesus disappeared in 1908. He may have died in 1908 in hospital in Ponta Grossa, Paraná, or may be buried in Lagoa Vermelha, Rio Grande do Sul. His devotees think the monk is still living in the Morro Taió, a hill in Santa Catarina.

== Legends ==
One legend tells that when João Maria de Jesus was passing through Ponta Grossa early in the 1900s some children playing in the street threw stones at him. The monk calmly called for retribution, saying, "Rude city, the stones that hurt me now will multiply and come back to you one day." According to the legend on 11 September 1906 an intense rain of stones fell in the town, damaging or destroying several houses. This is just one of several legends in which a cruel streak appears when the monk was offended in some way.

A common legend is that in the middle of storms the monk sat outside but did not get wet. Others said he could be praying in his cave and at the same time be next to a sick man, helping him. He was said to be able to become invisible to his persecutors, walk over the water of rivers, drive out evil spirits and calm storms, among other miracles. He was said to be immune to Indians and wild animals, who never attacked him. There are many stories of healing. The legends have become part of the folklore of the region.

== Legacy ==
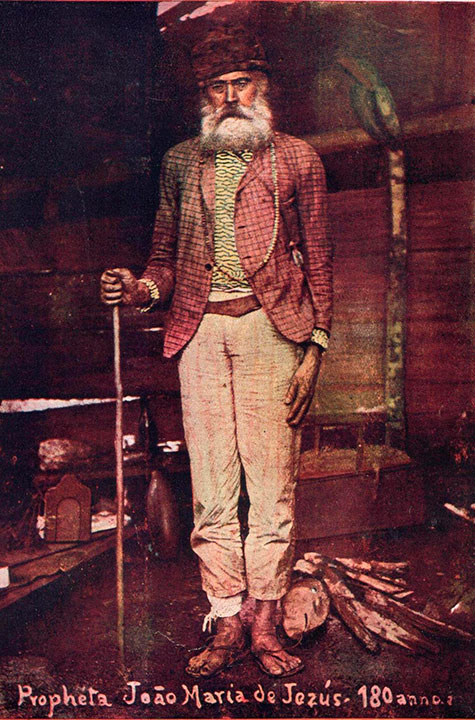
Hand-colored photograph from 1898

João Maria de Jesus and João Maria D'Agostini were the two best-known of the monks named "João Maria" who wandered in the region preaching in the last part of the 19th century. There is a large literature about the monks called João Maria, but the devout population have little interest in their historicity and are much more concerned with the sacred characteristics attributed to them. There are people today who think that João Maria, now more than 200 years old, still wanders in the region and works his miracles. There are many places in the center and east of Paraná and Santa Catarina, the south of São Paulo and the north of Rio Grande do Sul, where a small altar or cross marks a place where one of the "João Marias" would have passed.

The various wanderers recognized as the monk or prophet João Maria all have strong similarities. They are pilgrims, without home or family. They have withdrawn from the pleasures of the world to do penance by serving God. They preach the Apocalypse, when God will punish all sinners. They have the miraculous power of healing, and they are immortal.

João Maria de Jesus was photographed by Herculano Fonseca of Ponta Grossa in 1898, and these photographs were copied by a photographer from Caxias do Sul, Giácomo Geremia, who sold many copies of them. In the 1970s and 1980s the images were widely distributed among the local Kaingang and Xokleng people by leaders of the Indian Missionary Council. These photographs continue to be widely reproduced in southern Brazil today. Some have the legend "Prophéta Jõao Maria de Jesúz, 180 anos". Others calls him "Santo" (saint) with the legend "João Maria de Jesus com 188 anos", which would give a birth date around the time when the first João Maria was born. A painting that copies one of the photographs has the legend "Jõao Maria de Agostinho Propheta", reflecting the confusion with the earlier João Maria.

The monk stayed near a spring of water in the Uvaranas neighborhood of Ponta Grossa. The place was still being visited by devotees in 2012. A woman who cares for the site at that time said she had witnessed three apparitions of João Maria de Jesus.

== See also ==
- Zé Arigó

== Sources ==
- Alves, Robinson Fernando (January–June 2010), "O Monge João Maria de Agostinho em Campestre, Santa Maria: Aspectos Históricos", Debates do NER (in Portuguese), 11 (17), Porto Alegre
- Araújo, José Maria Grácia (23 June 2016), "Monge João Maria", Rádio Najuá (in Portuguese)
- Carvalho, Tarcísio Motta de (8 December 2010), "Monges peregrinos", Revista de História da Biblioteca Nacional (in Portuguese)
- Cueto, Marcos; Palmer, Steven (2014-12-15), Medicine and Public Health in Latin America, Cambridge University Press, ISBN 978-1-107-02367-3
- Kubaski, Derek (25 May 2012), "Os monges "Joões Marias" de um Paraná caboclo", Gazeta do Povo (in Portuguese)
- Silva, Gabriel Ribeiro da; Kunrath, Gabriel Carvalho (2015), "Os caminhos do Monge Joao Maria no planalto meridional Brasileiro", O historiador e as novas tecnologias – reunião de artigos do II Encontro de Pesquisas Históricas – PUCRS: Evento acadêmico – História – Encontro – Pós-graduação – Graduação – PUCRS (in Portuguese), Memorial do Ministério Público do Rio Grande do Sul, ISBN 978-85-88802-22-3
- Welter, Tania (17 September 2007), "O Profeta São João Maria Continua Encantando no Meio do Povo" (PDF) (thesis) (in Portuguese), Florianapolis: Universidade Federal de Santa Catarina
