= Lapa, Paraná =

Municipality in Paraná, Brazil

Coordinates: 25°46′12″S 49°42′57″W

Lapa
- Municipality
- Municipality of Lapa
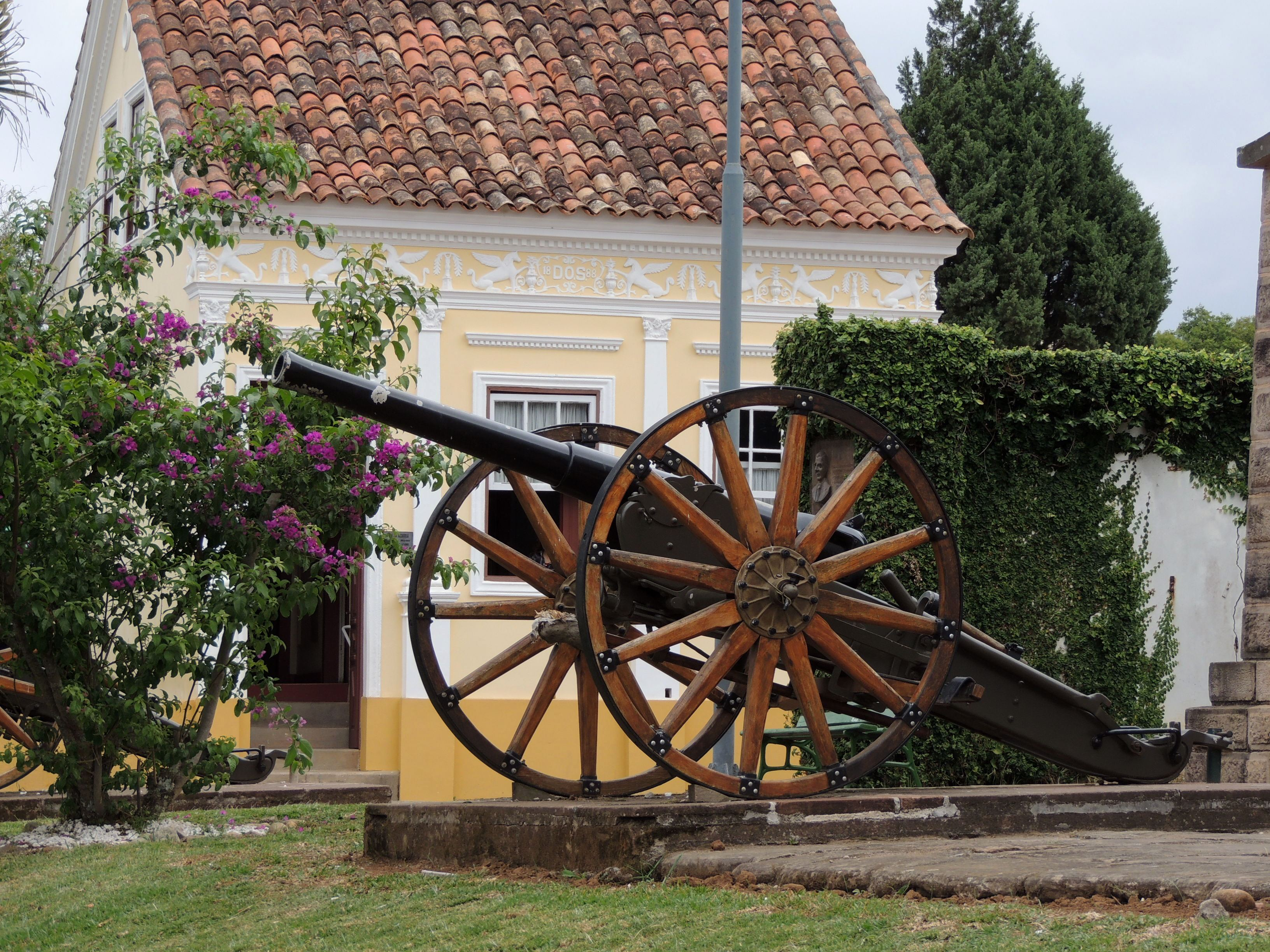
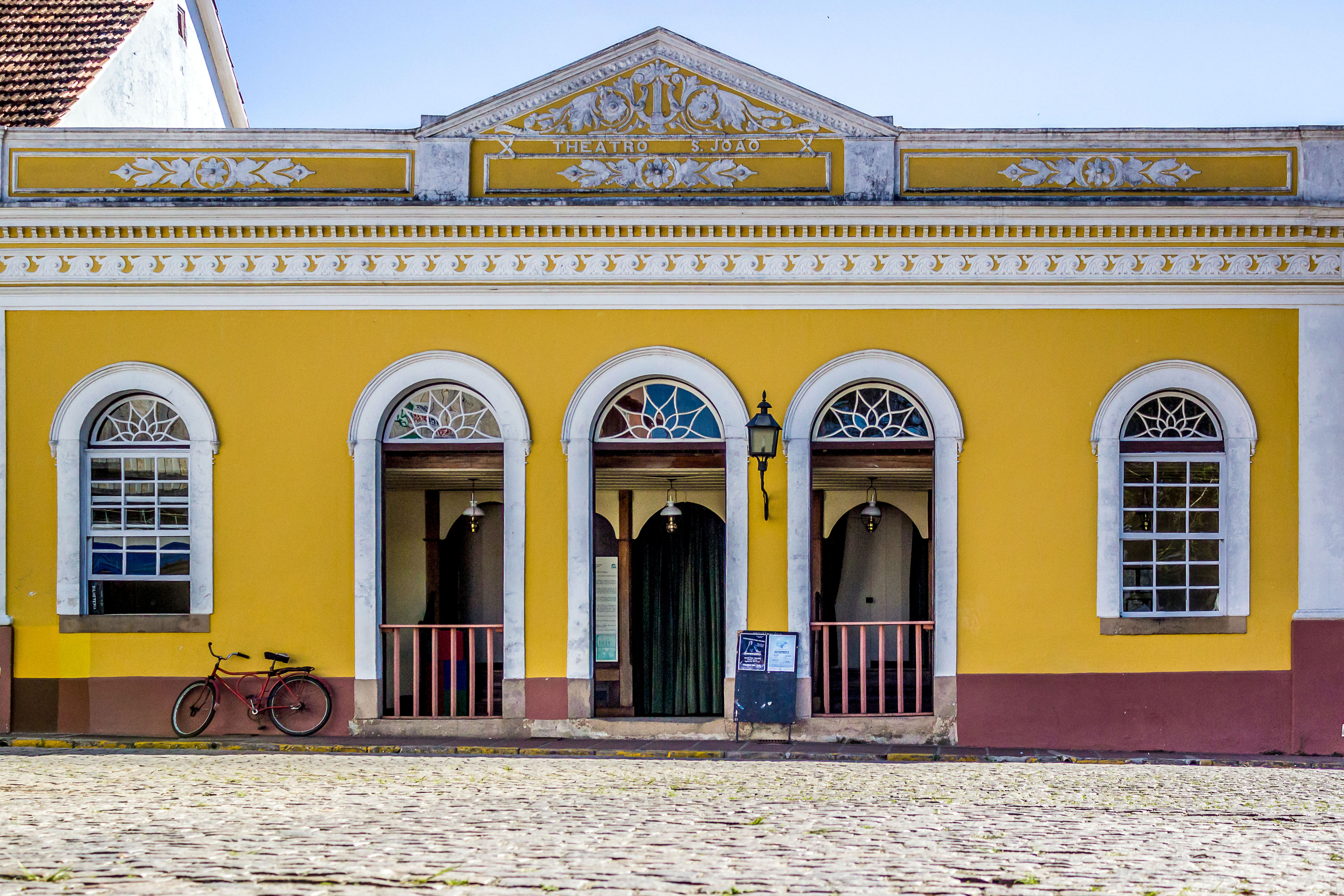
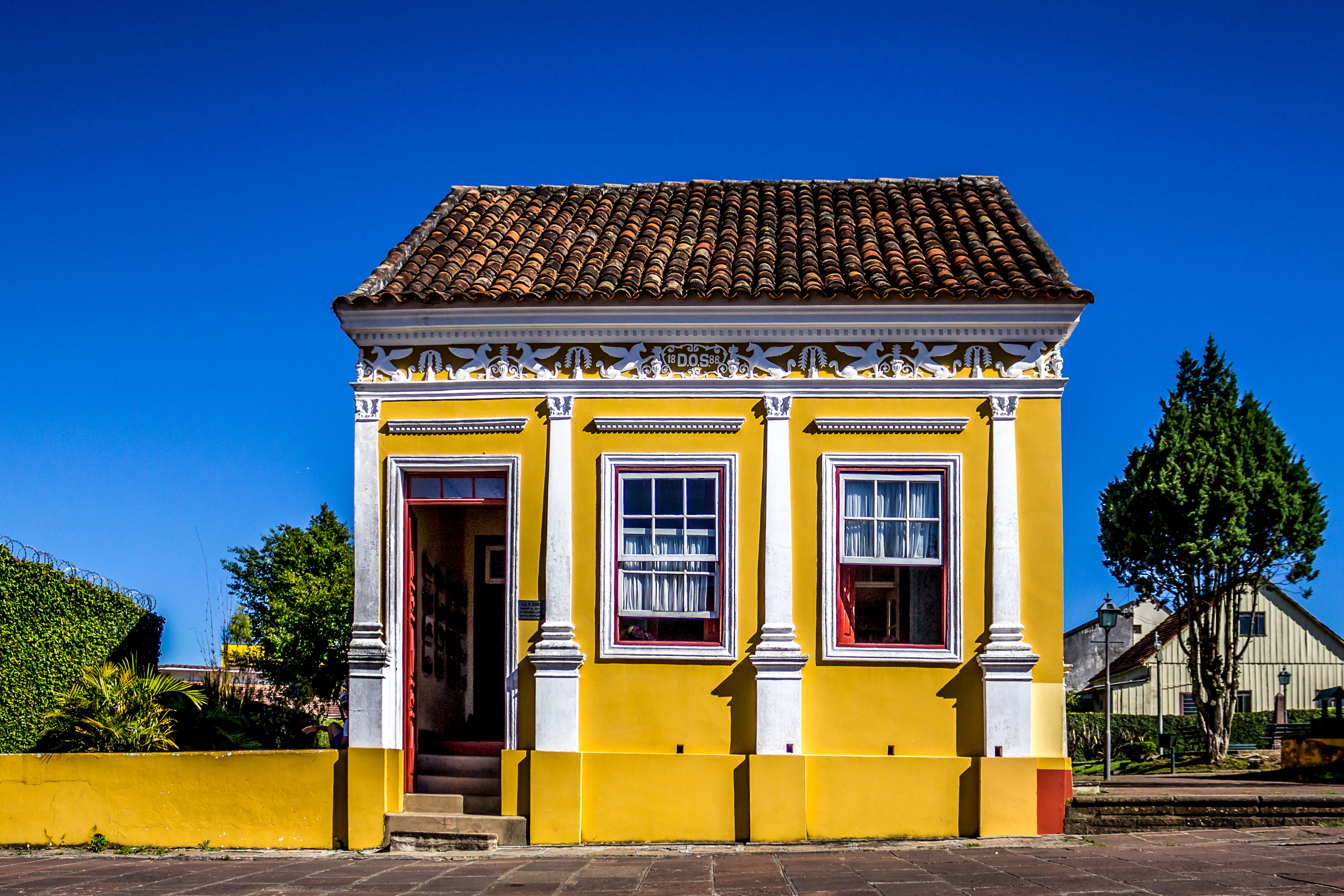
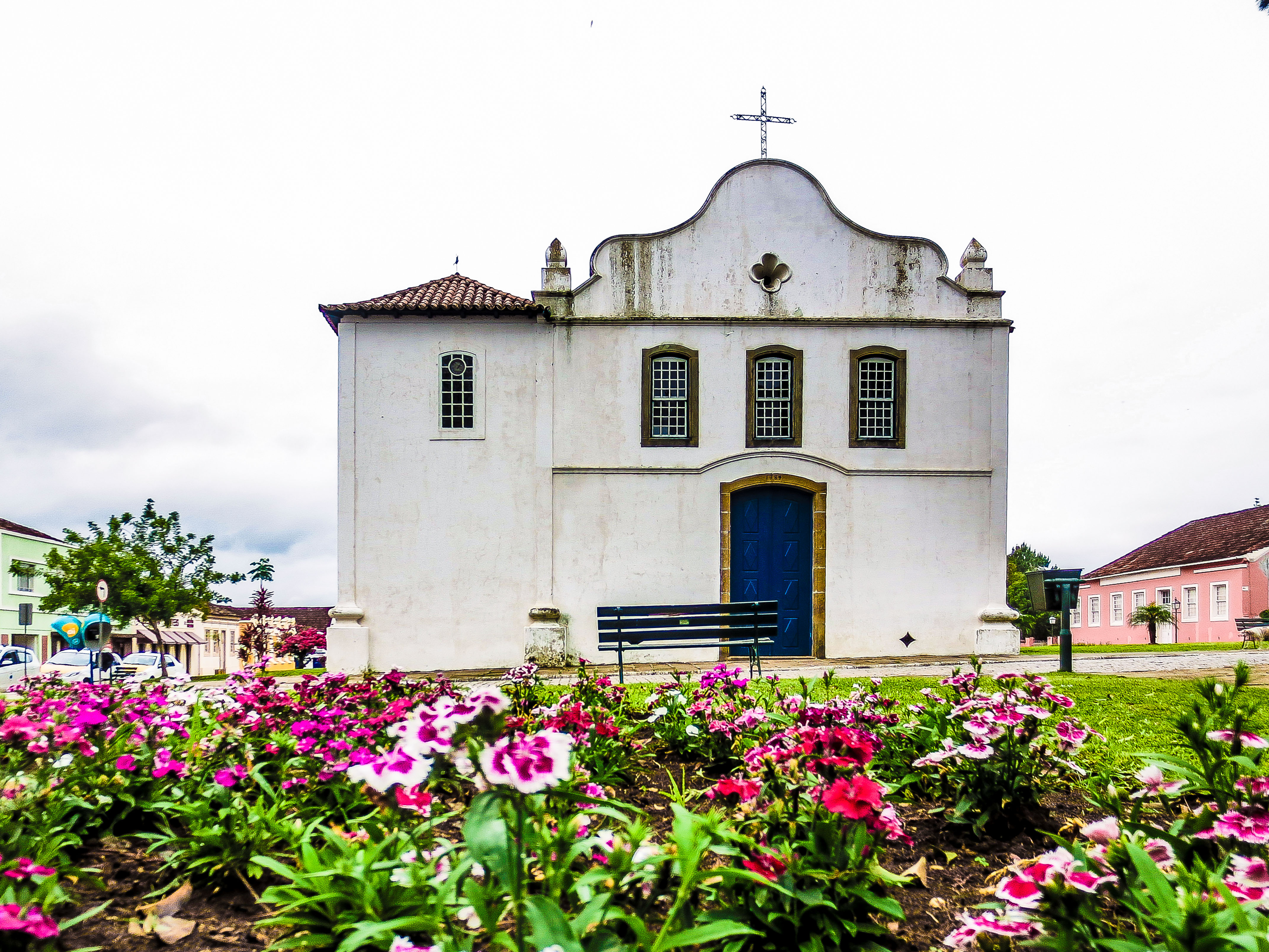
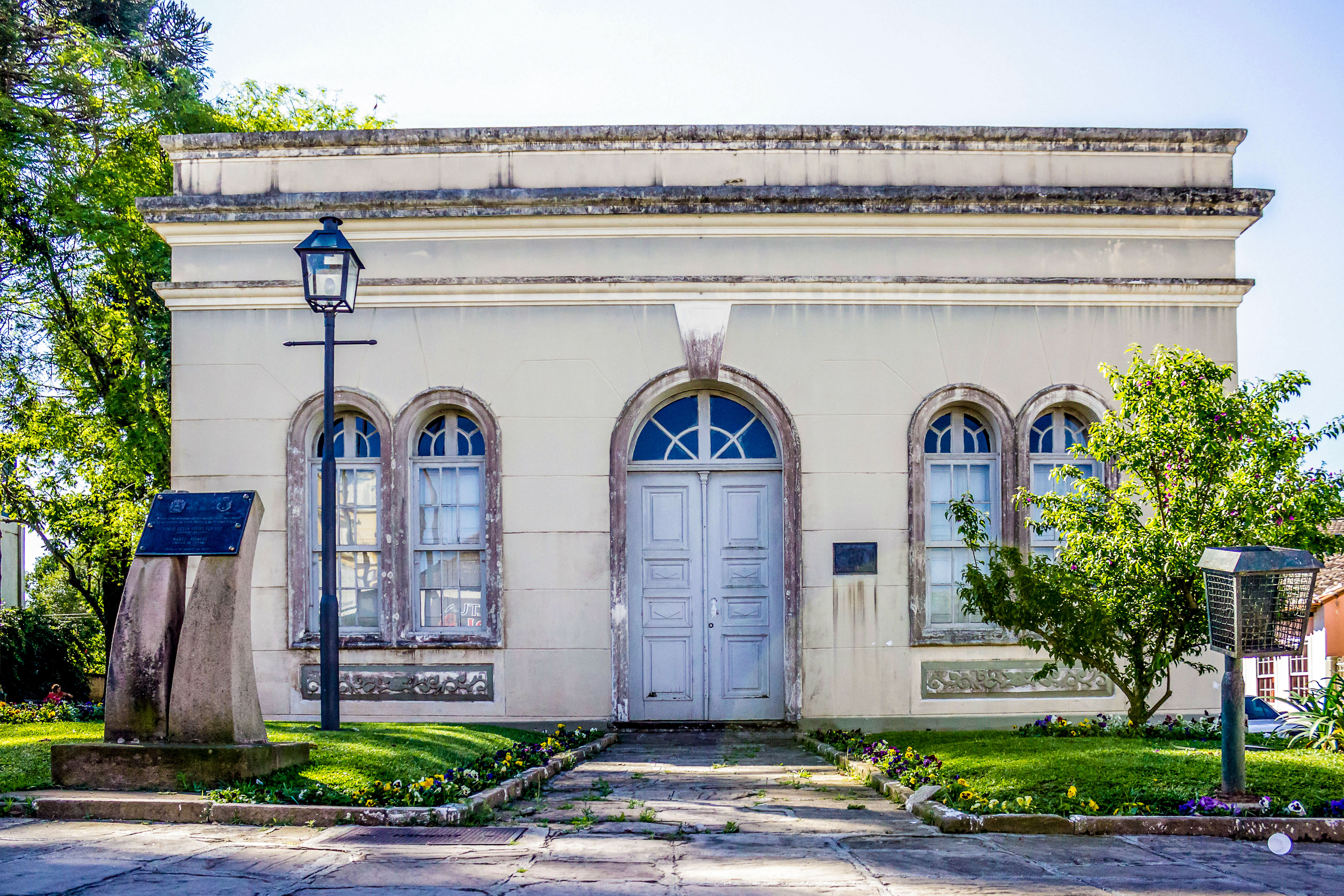
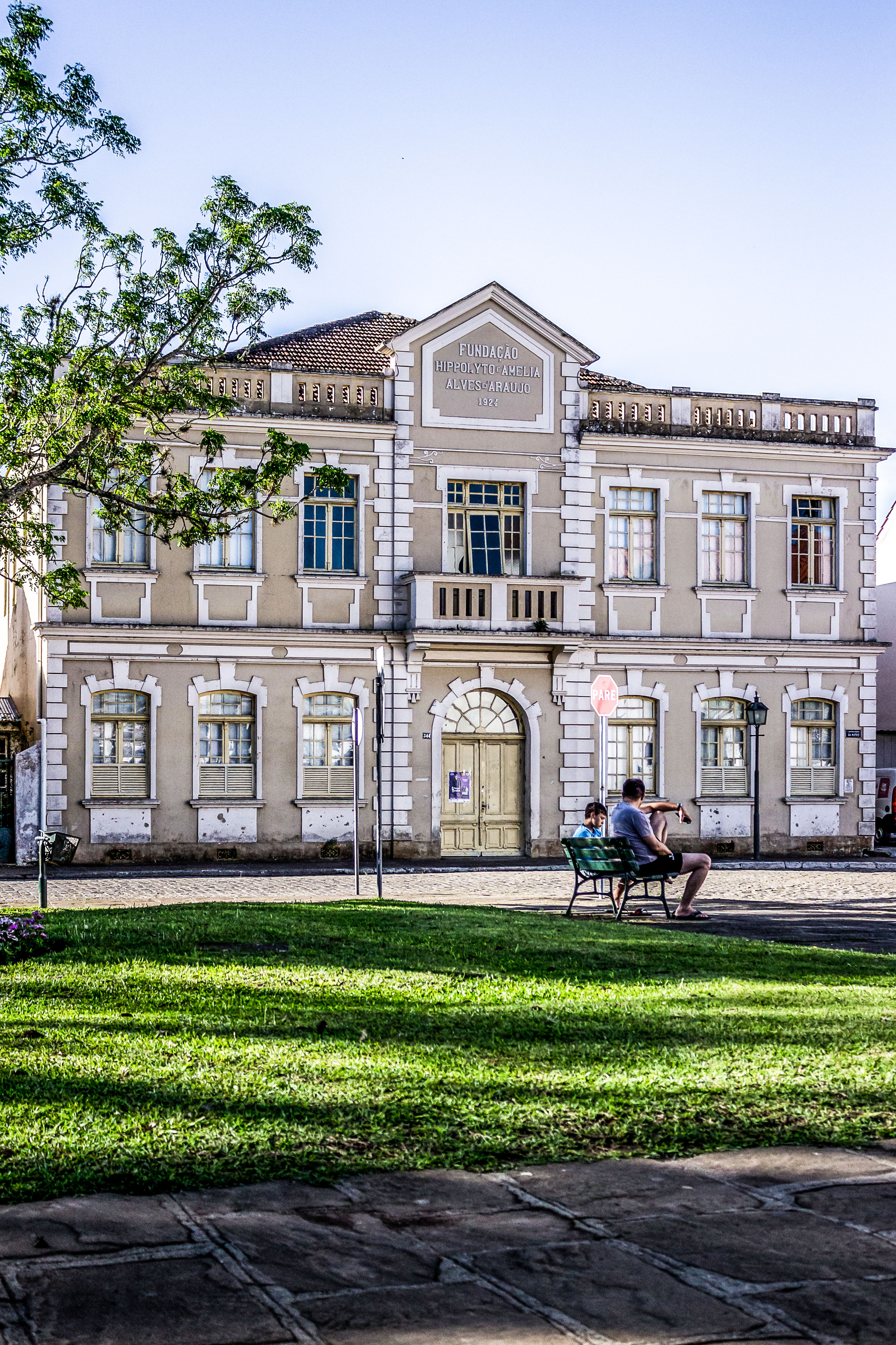

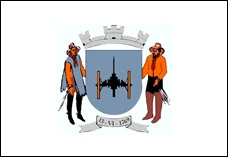
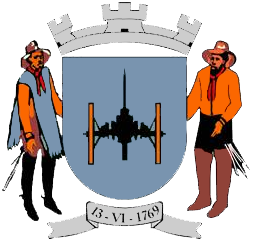
- Flag Coat of arms

- Location in Paraná
- Country: Brazil
- Region: South
- State: Paraná
- Mesoregion: Metropolitana de Curitiba

Population (2020)
  - Total: 48,410
- Time zone: UTC−3 (BRT)

Lapa is a municipality in the state of Paraná, in the Southern Region of Brazil.

The municipality contains the 371.6-hectare (918-acre) Monge State Park, created in 1960.

== History ==
Lapa was discovered in 1731, and became municipality on 7 March 1872.

== Culture ==
Lapa is known for being a historical city in Paraná, Brazil. The cuisine is coxinha de farofa, it is a typical food in Lapa.

== Geography ==
=== Climate ===
Lapa is classified as oceanic climate (Köppen climate classification: Cfb). The annual temperature on summer is 27 °C, on winter, the temperature reaches to 9 °C. Frost are common on winter.

Climate data for Lapa, Paraná, elevation 910 m (2,990 ft), (1989–2017)
Month	Jan	Feb	Mar	Apr	May	Jun	Jul	Aug	Sep	Oct	Nov	Dec	Year
Record high °C (°F)	34.8 (94.6)	33.5 (92.3)	32.6 (90.7)	31.0 (87.8)	28.7 (83.7)	26.9 (80.4)	27.8 (82.0)	31.5 (88.7)	32.7 (90.9)	33.4 (92.1)	33.5 (92.3)	33.7 (92.7)	34.8 (94.6)
Mean daily maximum °C (°F)	26.9 (80.4)	26.7 (80.1)	25.7 (78.3)	23.7 (74.7)	20.1 (68.2)	19.1 (66.4)	19.3 (66.7)	21.0 (69.8)	21.4 (70.5)	23.1 (73.6)	24.8 (76.6)	26.2 (79.2)	23.2 (73.7)
Daily mean °C (°F)	20.7 (69.3)	20.8 (69.4)	19.7 (67.5)	17.7 (63.9)	14.4 (57.9)	13.3 (55.9)	12.9 (55.2)	14.3 (57.7)	15.4 (59.7)	17.2 (63.0)	18.6 (65.5)	20.2 (68.4)	17.1 (62.8)
Mean daily minimum °C (°F)	16.9 (62.4)	17.2 (63.0)	16.1 (61.0)	14.2 (57.6)	10.7 (51.3)	9.6 (49.3)	8.8 (47.8)	9.8 (49.6)	11.4 (52.5)	13.5 (56.3)	14.6 (58.3)	16.3 (61.3)	13.3 (55.9)
Record low °C (°F)	9.0 (48.2)	10.5 (50.9)	5.8 (42.4)	0.6 (33.1)	−1.8 (28.8)	−3.8 (25.2)	−4.5 (23.9)	−3.9 (25.0)	−1.6 (29.1)	4.5 (40.1)	5.2 (41.4)	6.5 (43.7)	−4.5 (23.9)
Average precipitation mm (inches)	206.3 (8.12)	173.0 (6.81)	137.6 (5.42)	99.8 (3.93)	100.1 (3.94)	127.9 (5.04)	117.6 (4.63)	87.9 (3.46)	152.1 (5.99)	166.2 (6.54)	121.5 (4.78)	154.7 (6.09)	1,644.7 (64.75)
Average precipitation days (≥ 1.0 mm)	17	16	13	9	10	10	9	8	12	14	12	14	144
Average relative humidity (%)	85	84	84	83	84	85	82	78	79	82	79	80	82
Mean monthly sunshine hours	166.9	161.9	179.3	169.9	158.8	151.7	172.1	195.5	152.1	148.3	176.0	178.0	2,010.5
Source: IDR-Paraná

== See also ==
- List of municipalities in Paraná
