= Curitibanos =

Municipality in South, Brazil

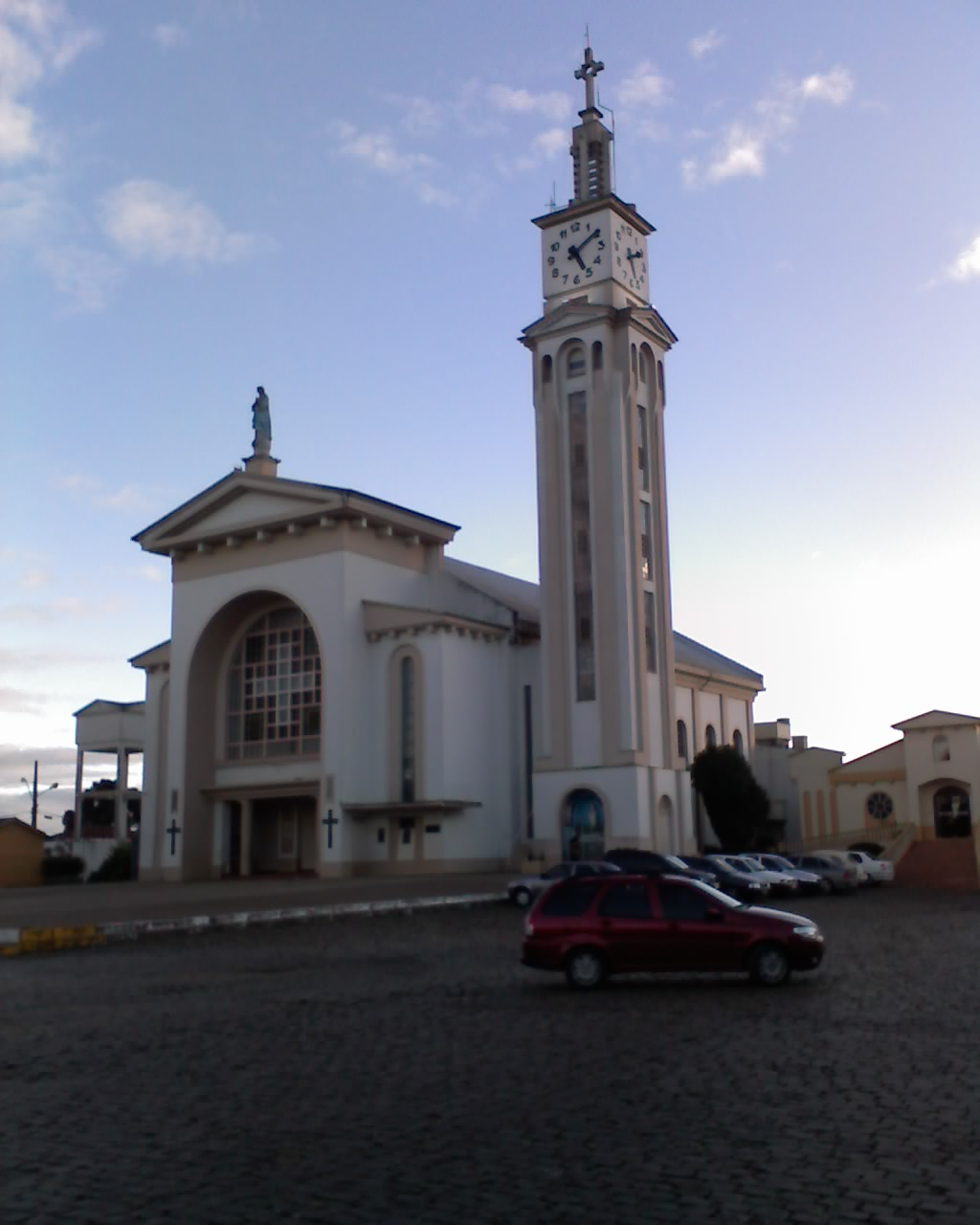
- Church in Curitibanos

- Flag Coat of arms
- Nickname: Ame Curitibanos (Love Curitibanos)
- Location of Curitibanos

- Location within Brazil
- Coordinates: 27°18′00″S 50°34′30″W
- Country: Brazil
- Region: South
- State: (Santa Catarina (state)) Santa Catarina
- Founded: June 11, 1869

Government
  - Mayor: Kleberson Luciano Lima (PMDB)

Area
  - Total: 952.283 km^{2} (367.679 sq mi)
- Elevation: 987 m (3,238 ft)

Population (2020)
  - Total: 39,893
  - Density: 40/km^{2} (100/sq mi)
- Time zone: UTC-3 (UTC-3)
  - Summer (DST): UTC-2 (UTC-2)
- HDI (2000): 0.769
- Website: www.curitibanos.sc.gov.br

Curitibanos is a Brazilian municipality in the state of Santa Catarina. It is located at 27º16'58"S latitude and 50º35'04"W longitude, at an elevation of 987 metres. It has an area of 953.67 km^{2} and its population, according to 2018 IBGE estimates, was 39,595 inhabitants.

== History ==
Curitibanos was founded in 1679, and became municipality on 11 June 1869.

== Climate ==
Curitibanos has oceanic climate (Köppen climate classification: Cfb) on summer the temperature reaches 25 °C, on winter it reaches 7 °C, rarely falling below 0 °C or exceeding 13 °C. The highest temperature was 34 °C. The lowest temperature was -5 °C. Frost is common on winter.

Climate data for Curitibanos, elevation 1,016 m (3,333 ft), (1976–2005)
Month	Jan	Feb	Mar	Apr	May	Jun	Jul	Aug	Sep	Oct	Nov	Dec	Year
Record high °C (°F)	33.2 (91.8)	31.3 (88.3)	31.5 (88.7)	30.1 (86.2)	27.6 (81.7)	26.2 (79.2)	28.6 (83.5)	31.0 (87.8)	32.0 (89.6)	32.6 (90.7)	33.5 (92.3)	33.4 (92.1)	33.5 (92.3)
Mean daily maximum °C (°F)	26.3 (79.3)	25.7 (78.3)	24.9 (76.8)	22.3 (72.1)	18.9 (66.0)	17.6 (63.7)	17.5 (63.5)	19.3 (66.7)	19.5 (67.1)	21.6 (70.9)	24.1 (75.4)	26.1 (79.0)	22.0 (71.6)
Daily mean °C (°F)	20.8 (69.4)	20.5 (68.9)	19.3 (66.7)	16.9 (62.4)	13.8 (56.8)	12.2 (54.0)	11.6 (52.9)	13.3 (55.9)	14.2 (57.6)	16.7 (62.1)	18.5 (65.3)	20.3 (68.5)	16.5 (61.7)
Mean daily minimum °C (°F)	16.7 (62.1)	16.5 (61.7)	15.5 (59.9)	13.2 (55.8)	9.4 (48.9)	8.1 (46.6)	7.7 (45.9)	8.8 (47.8)	10.5 (50.9)	12.8 (55.0)	14.1 (57.4)	16.0 (60.8)	12.4 (54.4)
Record low °C (°F)	6.8 (44.2)	6.2 (43.2)	3.1 (37.6)	5.0 (41.0)	−5.0 (23.0)	−6.5 (20.3)	−6.0 (21.2)	−7.8 (18.0)	−2.3 (27.9)	2.2 (36.0)	2.6 (36.7)	8.3 (46.9)	−7.8 (18.0)
Average precipitation mm (inches)	168.5 (6.63)	145.3 (5.72)	133.6 (5.26)	90.1 (3.55)	103.8 (4.09)	102.1 (4.02)	122.6 (4.83)	116.3 (4.58)	139.6 (5.50)	162.7 (6.41)	83.4 (3.28)	111.7 (4.40)	1,479.7 (58.27)
Average relative humidity (%)	79	79	80	79	79	80	78	74	77	79	74	74	78
Mean monthly sunshine hours	198	166	178	173	174	148	165	187	145	157	203	215	2,109
Source: Empresa Brasileira de Pesquisa Agropecuária (EMBRAPA)

== See also ==
- List of municipalities in Santa Catarina
- Battle of Curitibanos
