= Cambirela Hill =

Mountain in Palhoça, Santa Catarina, Brazil

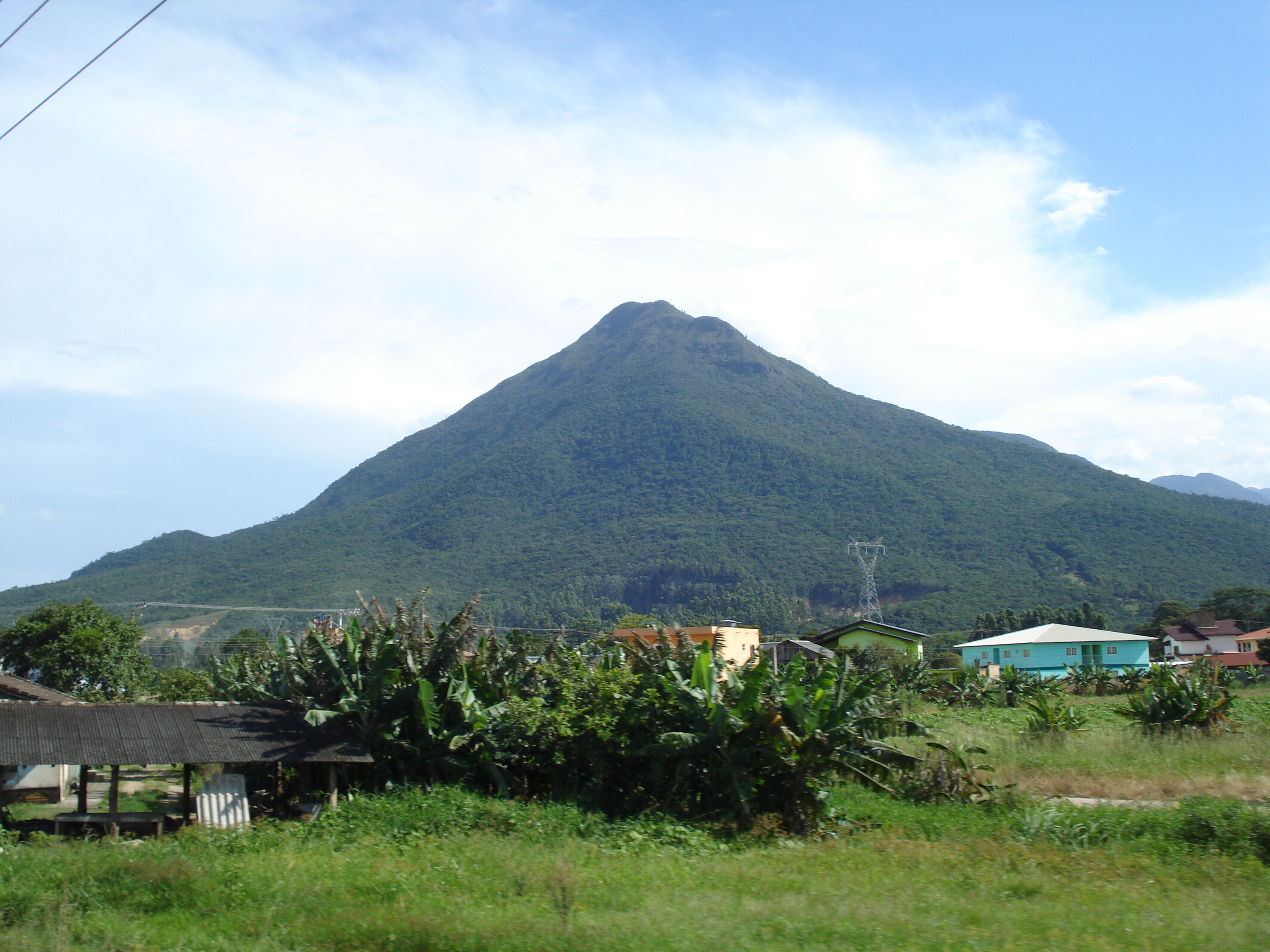
- Cambirela Hill, in Palhoça, Santa Catarina, Brazil.

Highest point
- Elevation: 1,052 m (3,451 ft)
- Coordinates: 27°45′47″S 48°38′50″W

Geography
- Location within Brazil
- Location: Palhoça, Santa Catarina, Brazil

Climbing
- First ascent: 1934
- Easiest route: North side

Cambirela Hill (Portuguese: Morro do Cambirela) is a mountain located in the same name massif, in the municipality of Palhoça, in the state of Santa Catarina. Its altitude is 1052 meters, which makes it the highest point in the municipality and the region, rising practically from sea level to a height of over a kilometer. It is located in the Serra do Tabuleiro State Park and dominates the entire Baía Sul.

It is thought to have been a volcano 590 million years ago. Cambirela Hill is popular with hikers who want to climb to the top. It is also known for the plane crash of 1949 and the snow of 2013, which accumulated at the top of the hill and was a climatic milestone in the Greater Florianópolis region. Its size and importance have led it to be depicted by artists such as Debret and Victor Meirelles and to lend its name to a wide variety of uses in Greater Florianópolis.

== Name ==
According to the Tupi-Guarani dictionary, the name "Cambirela" comes from kambi, which means “breasts of milk” and reya, which means “many”. These two words may refer to the various peaks of the Cambirela Massif and the clouds and waterfalls that are present on the hill.

"Cambirela" also became the name of the municipality next to Cambirela Hill, Santo Amaro da Imperatriz, which was until then called just Santo Amaro, in 1941, when the town was elevated to a village and the government issued a decree to eliminate duplicate names in towns - there were Santo Amaros in other states. However, a plebiscite resulted in the selection of the current name, which was made official in 1948.

== Geology and vegetation ==
The base of Cambirela Hill is made up of Granite Serra do Tabuleiro. Volcanic rocks overlying the Granite Serra do Tabuleiro, known as the Cambirela Plutono-Volcanic Suite, indicate that the hill was formed from volcanic eruptions. Rocks derived from this volcanism, classified as acid pyroclastic rocks, are found at the top of the hill. The Cambirela Plutono-Volcanic Suite, dated at 524+-68 million years, concludes the age of the Cambirela Hill.

The native vegetation is a remnant of the Atlantic Forest up to a certain altitude - around 800 m, after which there are grasses.

== Height, access, and trail ==
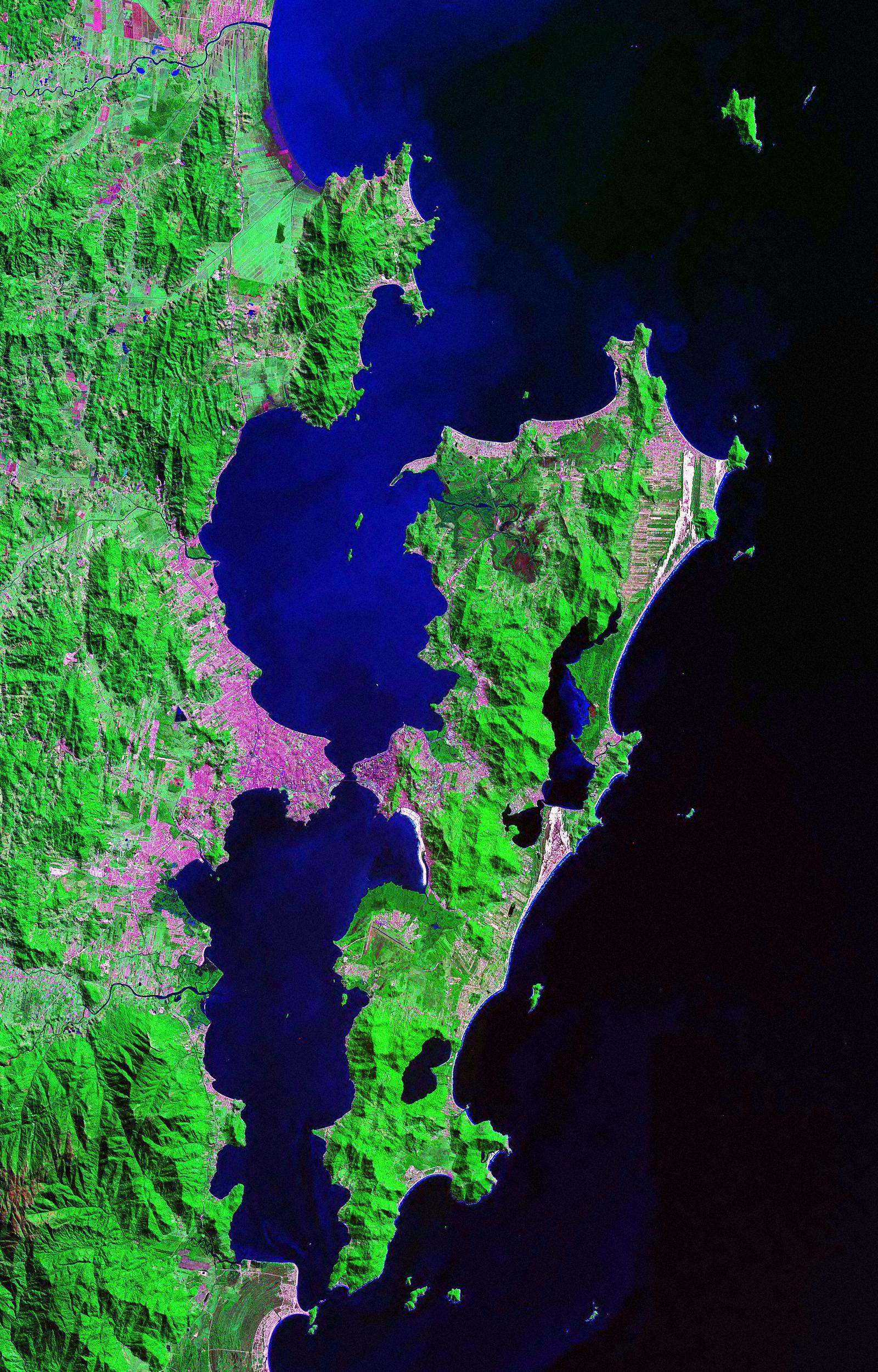
Satellite photo of Santa Catarina Island and the surrounding region. The Cambirela Massif is located in the bottom left-hand corner of the image.

The Cambirela Massif can be seen from Florianópolis at various points in the city, especially from the southwestern shore of Santa Catarina Island. It can also be seen from São José, Biguaçu, Santo Amaro da Imperatriz, and Palhoça. There are trails that lead to the top, along which are found some watercourses with clear water, such as the Cambirela River, which flows down from the mountain, and features some waterfalls. The walks take around three hours. Cases of people getting lost or needing rescue have been reported. They were rescued by the Fire Brigade, usually using a helicopter due to the difficulty of access.

There are two accesses, both from the BR-101 highway. The first is just after the bridge over the Cubatão River, on Jacob Vilain Filho Street. The second access is on the side of the road, at Km 222. The highest point accessible by trail is 980 meters high, on the north side. Recent studies by the technical course in Surveying at the Federal Institute of Santa Catarina have updated the measured height of Cambirela Hill, which is 1052 meters high at its peak, which is to the south of the part accessible by the regular trail - previous measurements recorded it as 1043 meters, as recorded by the IBGE. The first recorded climb of Cambirela Hill was in 1934 when the mountain was believed to be 1553 meters high. Until the 1980s, the trails were primarily used for exploratory and scientific purposes, and from then on trails with a recreational and environmental preservation purpose began to take place more frequently.

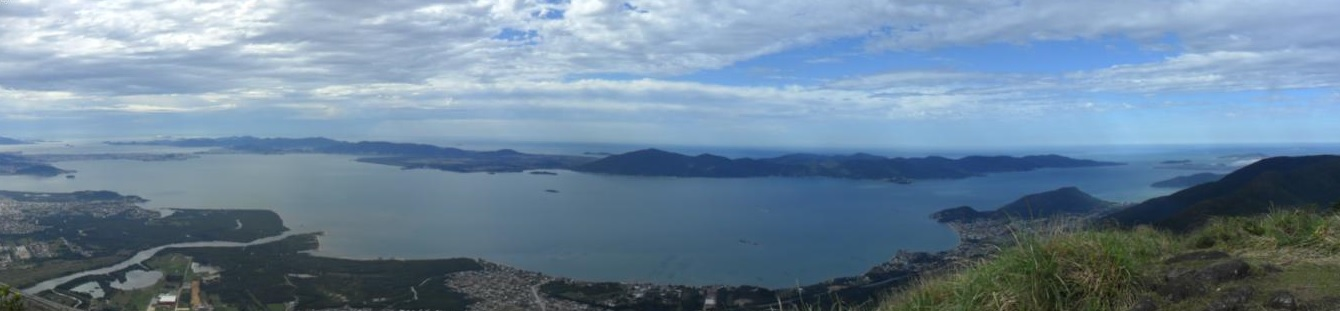
View from the top of Cambirela Hill, looking to East.

== Air crash of 1949 ==
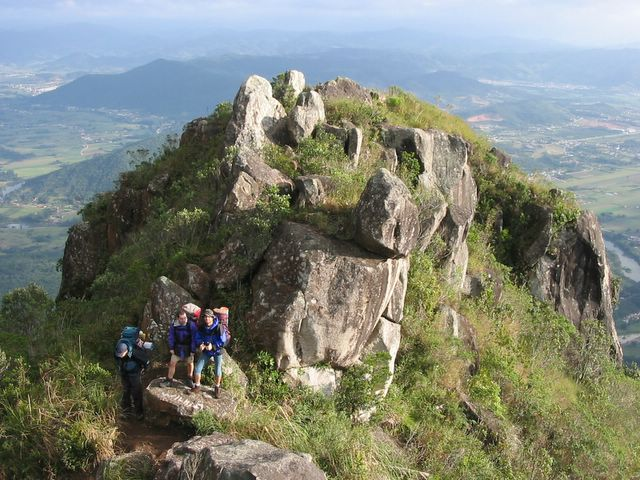
Highest accessible top of Cambirela Hill, approximately 980 meters above sea level.

On the afternoon of June 6, 1949, Flight 2023 - a Douglas C-47 from Correio Aéreo Nacional (CAN), coming from Rio de Janeiro, had left Hercílio Luz Airport in Florianópolis at 4 p.m. bound for Porto Alegre, crashing into Cambirela Hill shortly after takeoff. All 26 occupants died. Preliminary investigations suggested that the cause of the crash was adverse weather conditions.

== Snow ==
The formation of snow on Cambirela Hill has been recorded infrequently. Historically, snow visible from a distance has been recorded in 1942, 1984 and, the best known, in 2013. However, smaller precipitations, lasting a few minutes, may occur, but their frequency is unknown due to difficult access and limited recording.

In 2013, it snowed during the night of the day 23 of July and the ice remained on the peaks of the Serra do Tabuleiro until the next day, a phenomenon reported by the media and some residents of Greater Florianópolis.

== Fire ==
Fires that break out on the mountain have been reported, and it is difficult to fight them due to the difficult access. The last major fire started on April 26, 2020, in the morning, at the top of the mountain. The fire department was called to extinguish the fire and sent a helicopter to try to extinguish the flames with water. There were around 30 people at the scene, who were rescued by the firefighters. By the evening, the fire had still not been brought under control and the flames were visible from a considerable distance. The dry weather and the wind helped spread the flames and the area burned was about the size of a soccer field.

== Popular culture ==
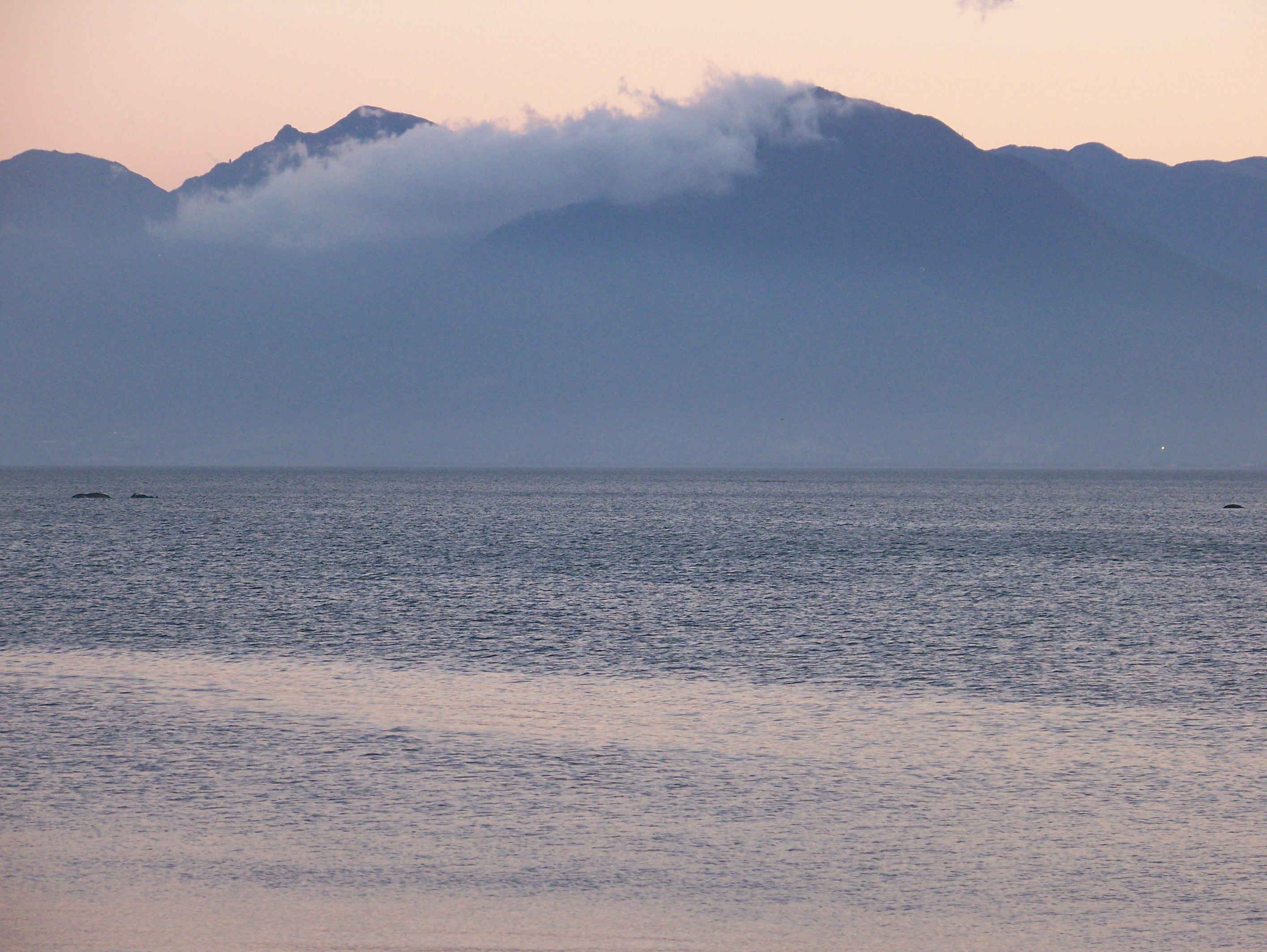
Cambirela Hill, with the peak behind the clouds, seen from Florianópolis. The face of the legendary giant can be seen on the left.

One of the stories from Florianópolis' folklore, which tells of the origin of the Itaguaçu stones, also features the "Cambirela giant": in it, the witches organized a party on the beach, with all the folkloric characters invited, except for the devil due to the character's portrayal in the story. The devil appears at the party and turns the witches to stone. The giant, who had been following the party from afar, witnessed it and is said to have turned his sorrow into the sea, lying down never to rise again. It is possible to see the giant's head, nose, neck, torso, legs, and feet, formed by the peaks of nearby hills, from certain points in the city, with Cambirela Hill serving as a pillow, and the mountain itself sometimes being called a giant. This legend is very similar to that of the Pedra da Gávea Giant in Rio de Janeiro.

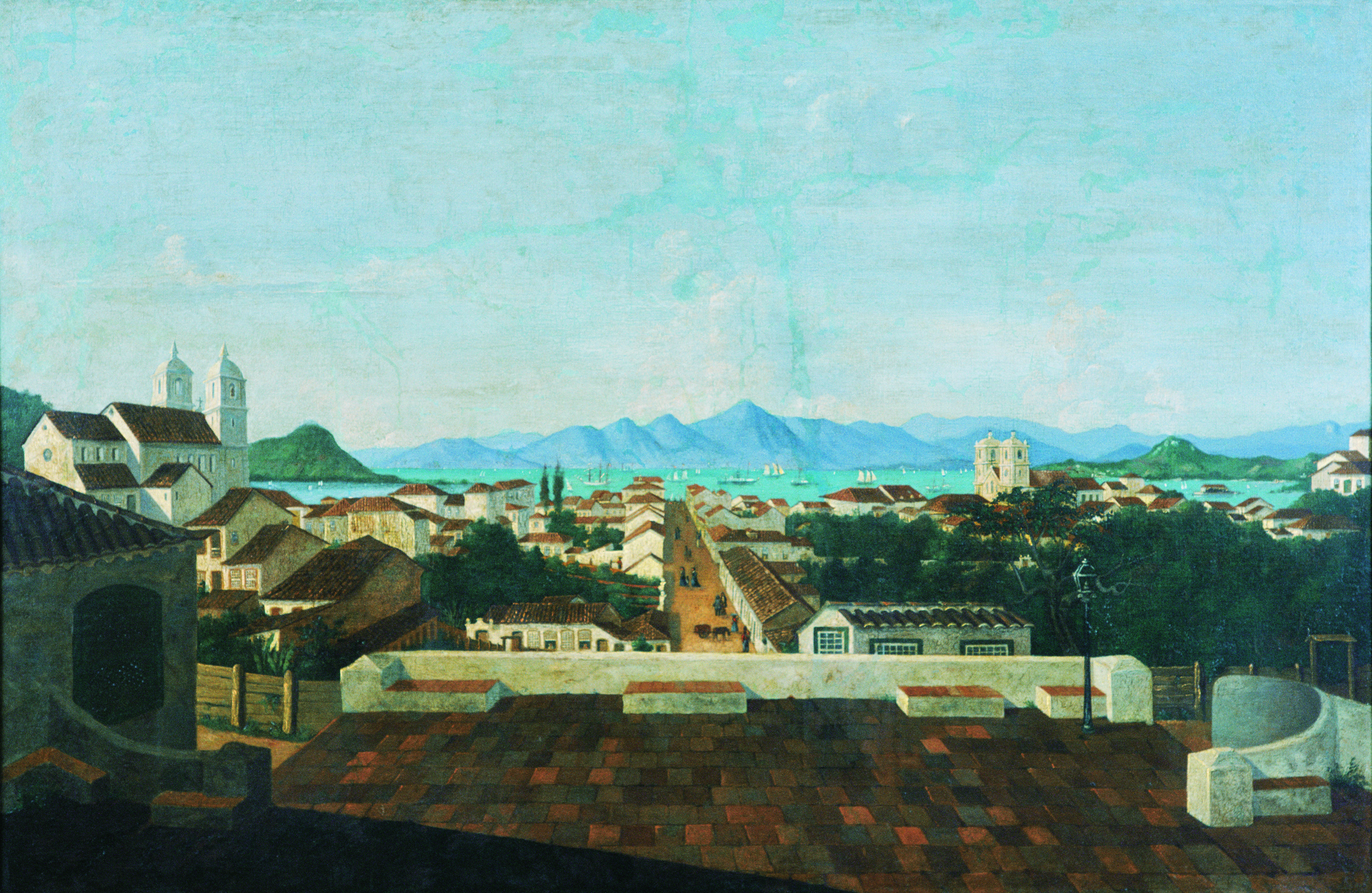
"Vista da Baía Sul", painting by Victor Meirelles.

In the arts, Cambirela Hill has been depicted in several paintings over the years. Some of them include “Entrada Norte da Ilha de Santa Catarina”, by George Anson in 1740; “Vista da Baia Sul da Ilha de Santa Catarina cidade de Desterro”, by Charles Landseer in 1824; “Panorama de São José e Cambirela” by Debret in 1826; “Vista da Antiga cidade de Desterro”, by Joseph Bruggemann in 1868; and the “Vista Parcial da Cidade de Nossa Senhora do Desterro” and "Vista da Baía Sul" by Victor Meirelles in 1847.

== See also ==
- Serra do Tabuleiro State Park
- Serra Furada State Park
