= Palhoça =

City in Santa Catarina State, southern Brazil

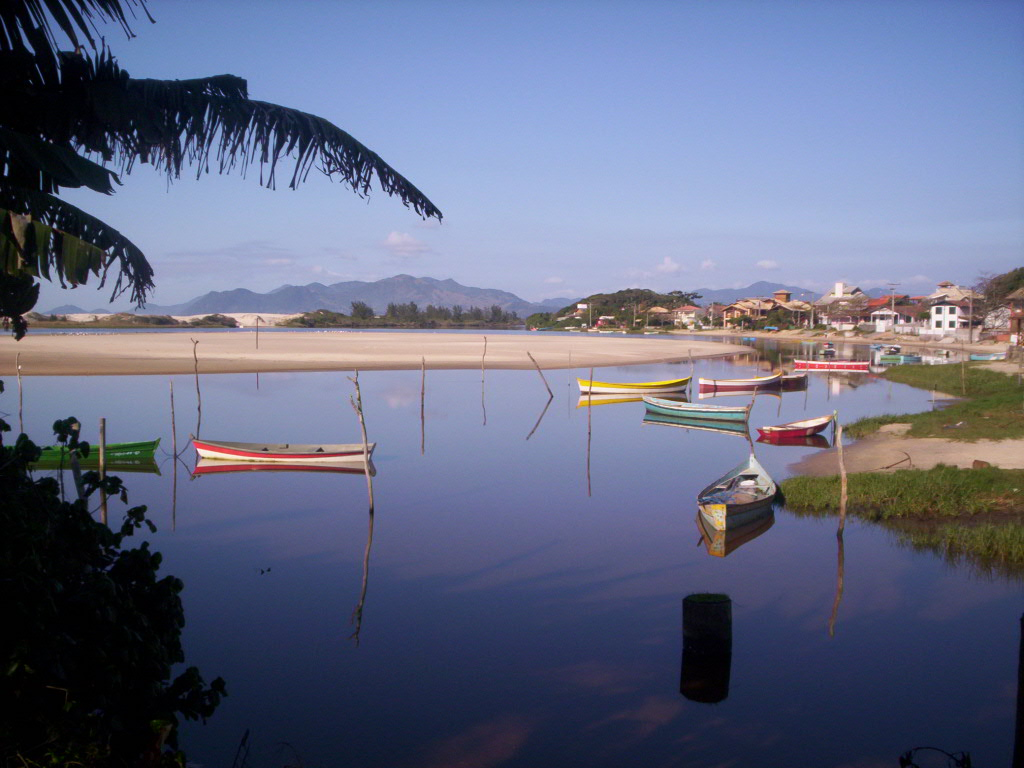
- Boats at Guarda do Embau, Palhoça

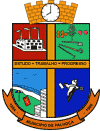
- Flag Coat of arms

- Location of Palhoça

- Location within Brazil
- Coordinates: 27°38′42″S 48°40′04″W
- Country: Brazil
- Region: South
- State: (Santa Catarina (state)) Santa Catarina
- Founded: July 31, 1793

Government
  - Mayor: Eduardo Freccia (PSD)

Area
  - Total: 394.662 km^{2} (152.380 sq mi)
- Elevation: 3 m (9.8 ft)

Population (2022 Brazilian census)
  - Total: 222,598
  - Estimate (2025): 253,469
  - Density: 564.022/km^{2} (1,460.81/sq mi)
- Time zone: UTC−3 (BRT)
- HDI (2000): 0.816
- Website: www.palhoca.sc.gov.br

Palhoça is a municipality in eastern Santa Catarina, Brazil. It is located on the Atlantic coast, 17 km (10 mi) from the state’s capital, Florianópolis.

== History ==
Palhoça was founded in 1793, when the city was part of the route between Lages and Florianópolis, in order to protect the state capital from possible invasions. Its name comes from “straw roof,” so called because of the large number of houses with this type of roof at the time, when the first inhabitants of Palhoça were natives.

== Geography ==
Palhoça is located in the Greater Florianópolis region. It is bordered to the north by São José, to the west by Santo Amaro da Imperatriz, to the south by Paulo Lopes, to the east by the southern bay of Santa Catarina Island, and to the southeast by the Atlantic Ocean.

Its coastline consists of an extensive mangrove area and beaches to the south.

The municipality contains part of the 84,130-hectare (207,900-acre) Serra do Tabuleiro State Park, a protected area created in 1975. The lushly forested park protects the sources of the Vargem do Braço, Cubatão and D'Una rivers, which supply most of the drinking water for Greater Florianópolis and the south coast region. The highest point in the city is Cambirela Mountain, located within the state park.

== Economy ==
The city’s most important industries are located in the industrial area of the Jardim Eldorado neighborhood. Commerce also plays a significant role, mainly in Ponte do Imaruim and the downtown area, although Pagani has become increasingly important to the city’s economy since the City Hall and City Council moved there in 2005. The southern region has developed tourism and fishing as ways to improve the local economy, as this area is not fully integrated with the rest of the city due to geographical and political reasons. The city’s major beaches are Guarda do Embaú, Pinheira, Ponta do Papagaio and Praia do Sonho.

The economy has been growing, and a major national clothing company as well as a multinational beverage company have established their distribution centers in Palhoça. A shopping mall was inaugurated in 2010, along with a large supermarket and a hotel, and more recently a medium-sized department store in the downtown area. For these reasons, the number of jobs has increased.

New private residential developments have also been built, with a focus on environmental preservation and quality of life, contributing to population growth and expanded employment opportunities.

== Transportation ==
The BR-282 highway connects the city to Santo Amaro da Imperatriz, while BR-101 connects Palhoça to São José and Paulo Lopes.

Buses are the only form of public transportation in Palhoça. Jotur, Imperatriz, and Paulo Lopes are the bus companies that operate in the city.

== Notable people ==
- Ricardo dos Santos (1990—2015), surfer who defeated Kelly Slater.

== See also ==
- List of municipalities in Santa Catarina
