= São Bonifácio =

Coordinates: 27°54′S 48°56′W

- Municipality
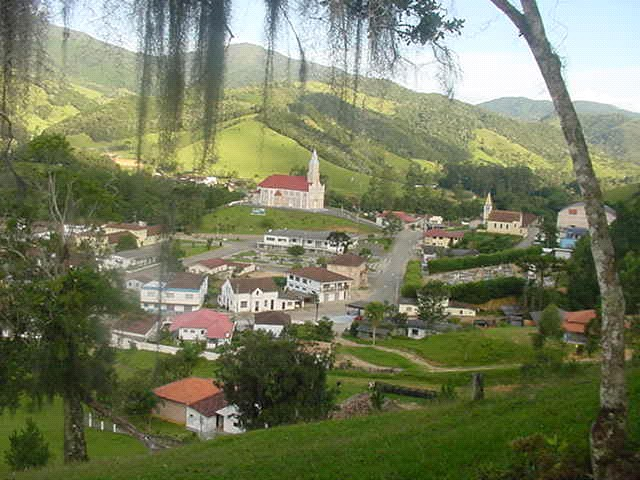

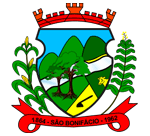
- Flag Coat of arms

- Location in Santa Caterina
- Country: Brazil
- Region: South
- State: Santa Catarina
- Mesoregion: Grande Florianópolis

Population (2020)
  - Total: 2,814
- Time zone: UTC -3

São Bonifácio is a municipality in the state of Santa Catarina in the South region of Brazil.

The municipality contains part of the 84,130-hectare (207,900-acre) Serra do Tabuleiro State Park, a protected area created in 1975. The lushly-forested park protects the sources of the Vargem do Braço, Cubatão and D'Una rivers, which supply most of the drinking water for greater Florianópolis and the south coast region.

== See also ==
- List of municipalities in Santa Catarina
