= Santo Amaro da Imperatriz =

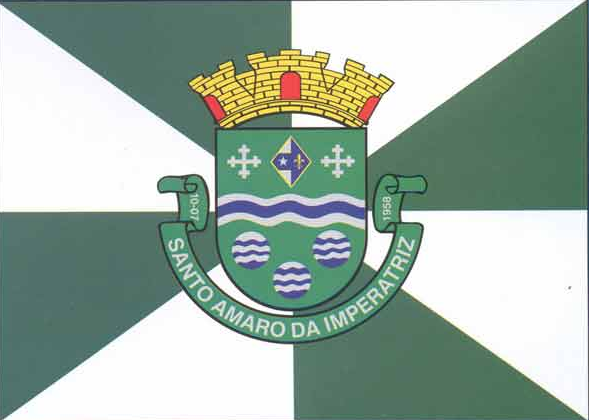
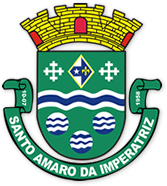
- Flag Coat of arms

- Location of Santo Amaro da Imperatriz

- Location within Brazil
- Coordinates: 27°41′16″S 48°46′44″W
- Country: Brazil
- Region: South
- State: (Santa Catarina (state)) Santa Catarina
- Founded: July 10, 1958

Government
  - Mayor: Ricardo Costa (MDB)

Area
  - Total: 352.4 km^{2} (136.1 sq mi)
- Elevation: 18 m (59 ft)

Population (2020)
  - Total: 23,579
  - Density: 58.7/km^{2} (152/sq mi)
- Time zone: UTC-3 (UTC-3)
  - Summer (DST): UTC-2 (UTC-2)
- HDI (2000): 0.843
- Website: www.santoamaro.sc.gov.br

Santo Amaro da Imperatriz, or simply Santo Amaro, is a municipality in Santa Catarina located close to the state capital Florianópolis and is connected to Palhoça by BR-282 in the northeast.

== Location ==
The municipality contains part of the 84,130-hectare (207,900-acre) Serra do Tabuleiro State Park, a protected area created in 1975. The lushly-forested park protects the sources of the Vargem do Braço, Cubatão and D'Una rivers, which supply most of the drinking water for greater Florianópolis and the south coast region. There are several farms in the municipality. The only urban zone is situated in Downtown Santo Amaro.

== Parties and festivals ==
The Festa do Divino Espírito Santo (Divine Holy Spirit Party) is the main religious celebration of the Florianópolis Region. Festa do Milho (Corn Festival) is another important festival of Santo Amaro.

== Economy ==
Even though Santo Amaro is a small city, important enterprises were founded in the city. Imperatriz Supermarkets was founded in 1974 and is the most profitable supermarket of Santa Catarina. É de Casa Supermarkets is also another important supermarkets network. It is also the headquarters of LOJA DA IRRIGAÇÃO, distributor of RAIN BIRD in Santa Catarina.

Auto Viação Imperatriz is the bus enterprise that drives people to Águas Mornas, Palhoça, São José and Florianópolis. Imperatriz is also another important enterprise that manufactures ice-cream.

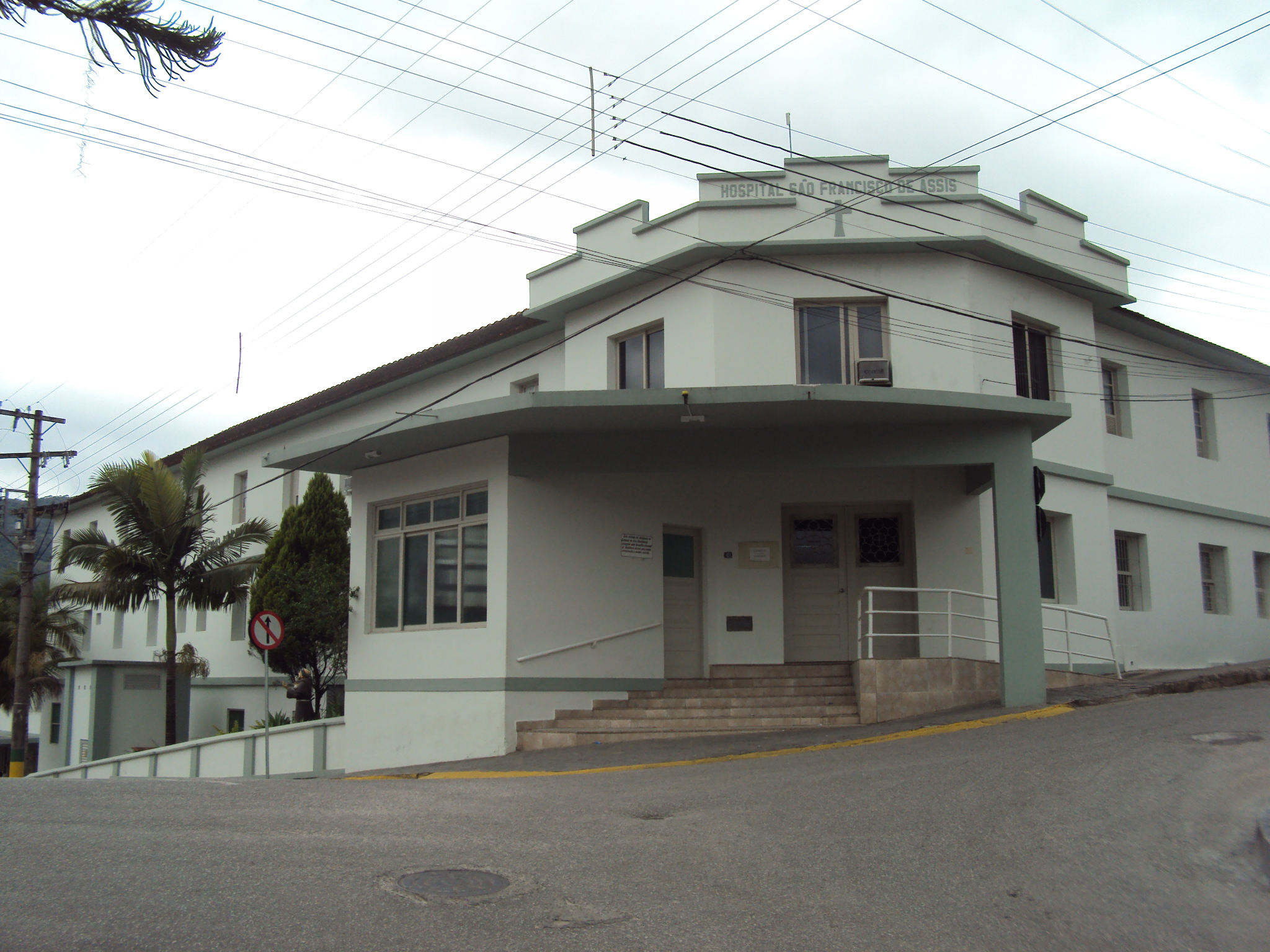
Hospital

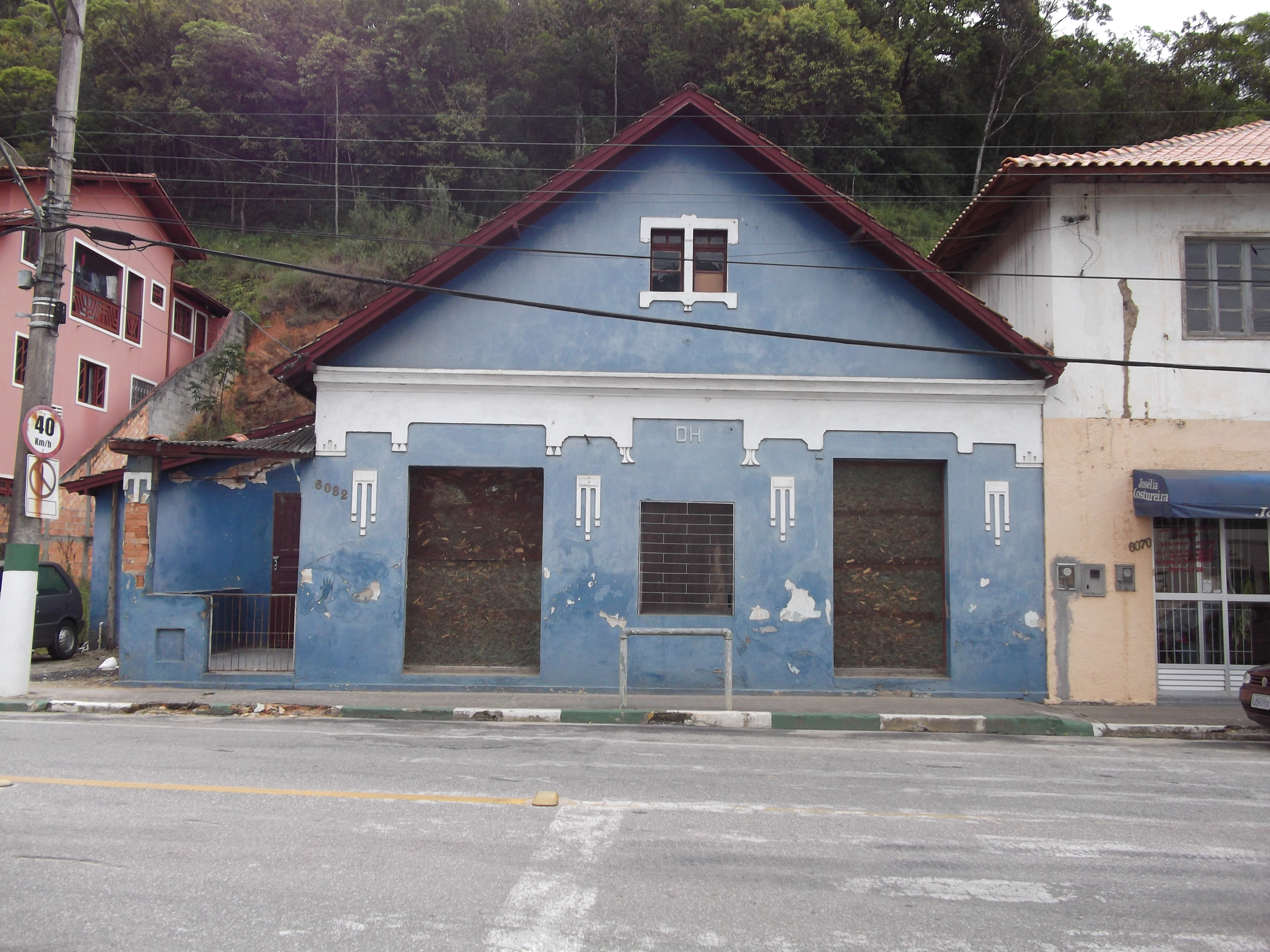
Street

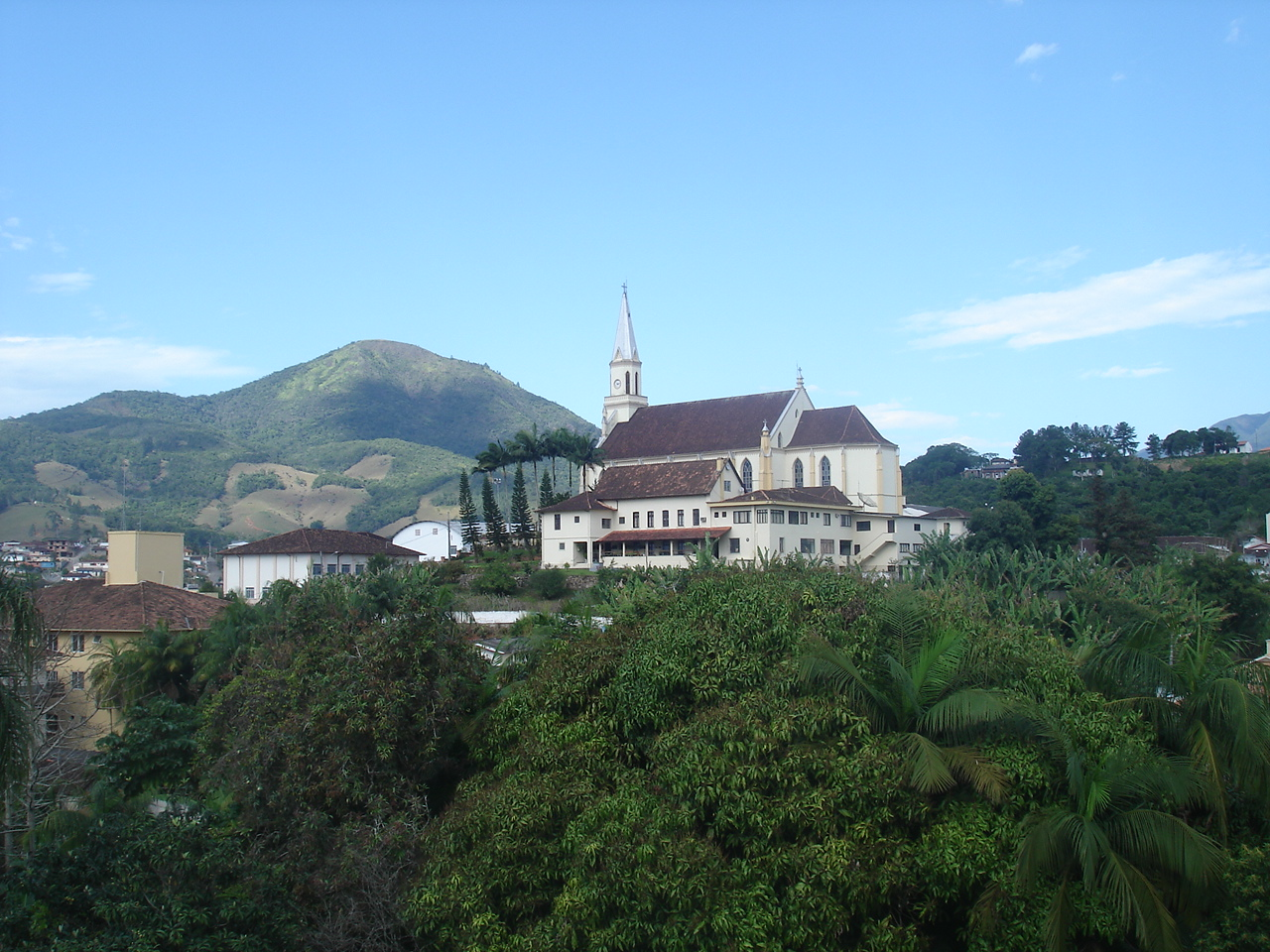
Church of Santo Amaro da Imperatriz
