= Rio das Lontras Private Natural Heritage Reserve =

Private natural heritage reserve in Brazil

- Reserva Particular do Patrimônio Natural Rio das Lontras
- IUCN category IV (habitat/species management area)
- Location within Brazil
- Nearest city: Santo Amaro da Imperatriz, Santa Catarina
- Coordinates: 27°37′34″S 48°52′52″W
- Area: 27.7 hectares (68 acres)
- Designation: Private natural heritage reserve
- Created: 4 May 2005
- Administrator: Teixeira family

The Rio das Lontras Private Natural Heritage Reserve (Portuguese: Reserva Particular do Patrimônio Natural Rio das Lontras) is a private natural heritage reserve in the state of Santa Catarina, Brazil.

== Location ==
The Rio das Lontras (Note: Rio das Lontras means "Otter River". The logo of the reserve is an otter drawn by cartoonist Ziraldo Alves Pinto. The original name was RPPN PT after the names of the proprietors, Pimentel and Teixeira. The cartoonist asked for a name he could illustrate. Otters were often seen bathing in the river that skirts the reserve, so the reserve was given its present name.) Private Natural Heritage Reserve was created by decree on 3 April 2005, modified on 14 May 2009. The decree creating the reserve, which had not yet been surveyed, said it had 23 hectares (57 acres). After a survey, the modified decree of May 2009 gave its area as 27.7 hectares (68 acres). It includes land in the municipalities of São Pedro de Alcântara and Águas Mornas in the state of Santa Catarina.

The average elevation is 300 metres (980 ft) above sea level. Re reserve's streams supply the Forquilhas River, a tributary of the Cubatão River. Average temperatures range from 16 to 25 °C (61 to 77 °F) with an average of 20.5 °C (68.9 °F). Annual rainfall is 1,390 millimetres (55 in) with no dry period but more rain in January and February.

== Environment ==
The reserve covers a fragment of the Atlantic Forest biome. It has rugged terrain with very well preserved dense montane rainforest and has a rich variety of trees, orchids, ferns and other flora. Fauna include anteaters, raccoons, coatis, armadillos, skunks, opossum, hedgehogs, squirrels, howler monkeys, ocelots, pumas and otters. Birds include weavers, toucans, woodpeckers, tanagers, jays, thrushes, ibises and hummingbirds.

== Conservation ==
The objectives are to preserve the environment and enable scientific research and environmental education. The proprietors make a small income from sale of T-shirts. The reserve is close to the Serra do Tabuleiro State Park to the south, which has more than 90,000 hectares (220,000 acres) of protected land, and is part of the mosaic of ecosystems and ecological corridors of great importance for maintenance of biological diversity.

== Sources ==
- Fabiana Dallacorte (July 2009), Plano de Manejo da RPPN Rio das Lontras - São Pedro de Alcântara e Águas Mornas, Santa Catarina (PDF) (in Portuguese), Brasília: ICMBio
- Reserva Particular do Patrimônio Natural Rio das Lontras (in Portuguese), MMA
- RPPN Reserve Ecologica Rio das Lontras (in Portuguese), Associação dos Proprietários de Reservas Particulares do Patrimônio Natural de Santa Catarina
- RPPN Rio das Lontras (in Portuguese), ICMBio
