= Águas Mornas =

- municipality
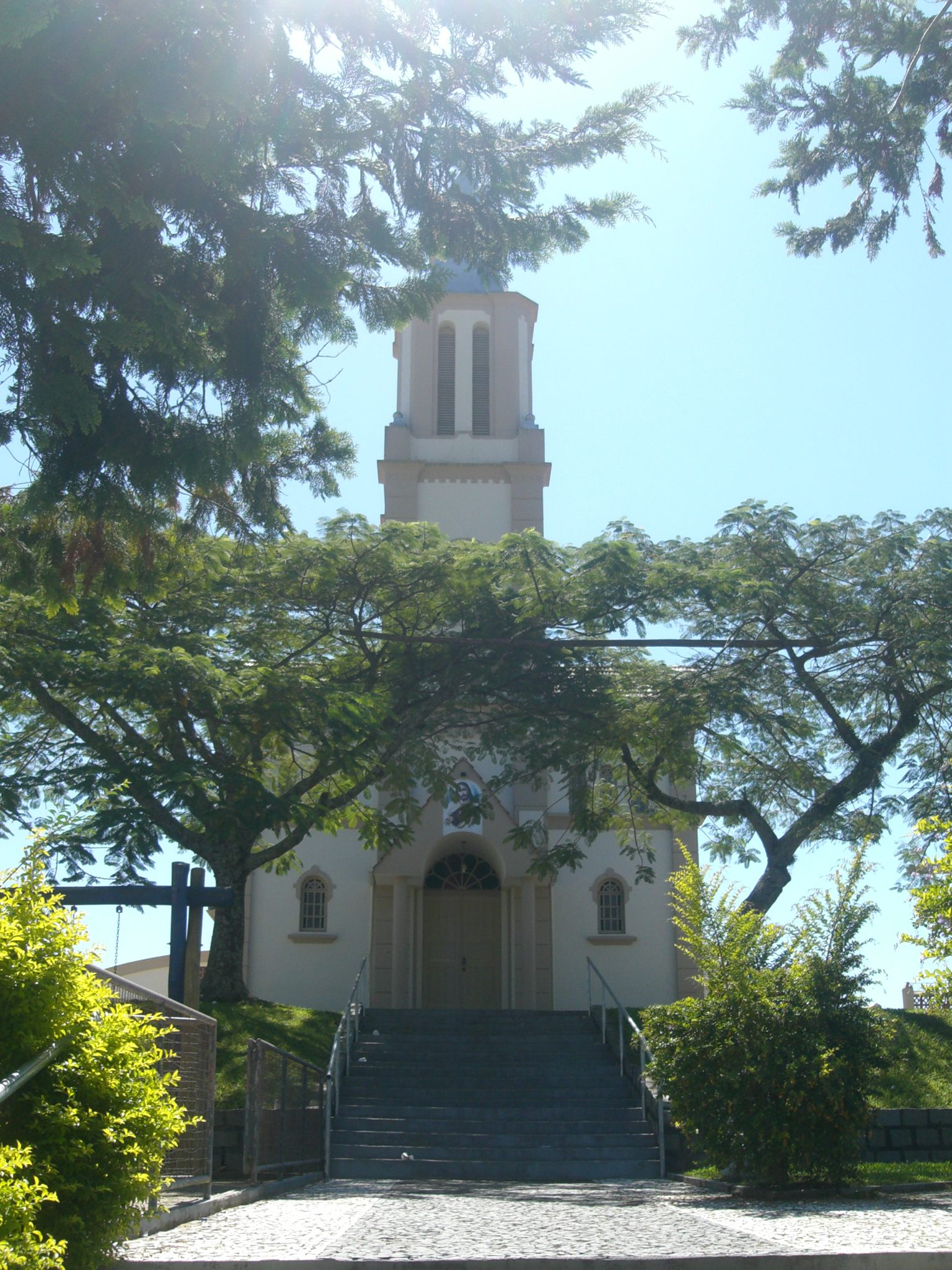
- Church of Águas Mornas and town square Evaldo Carlos Lehmkuhl

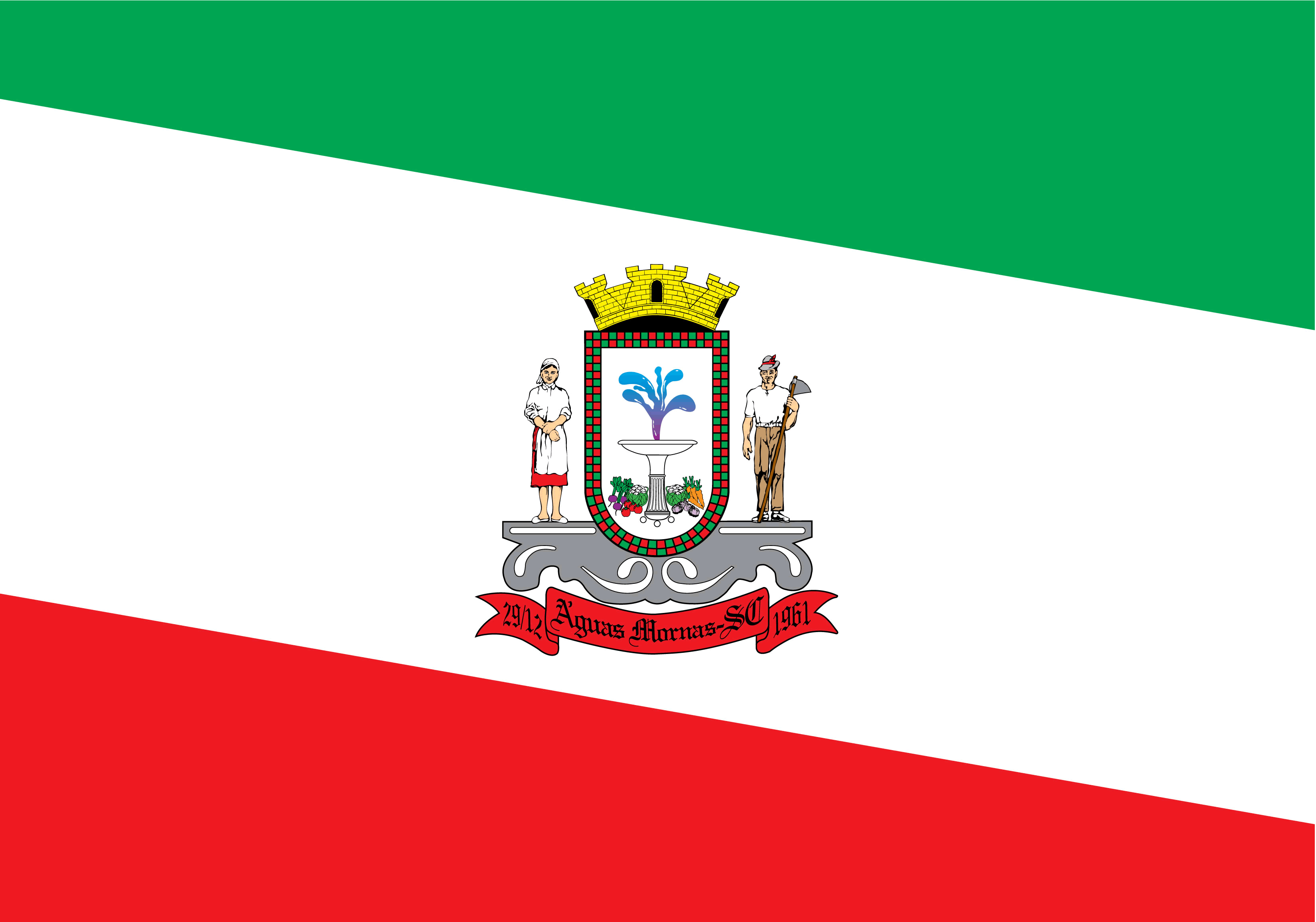
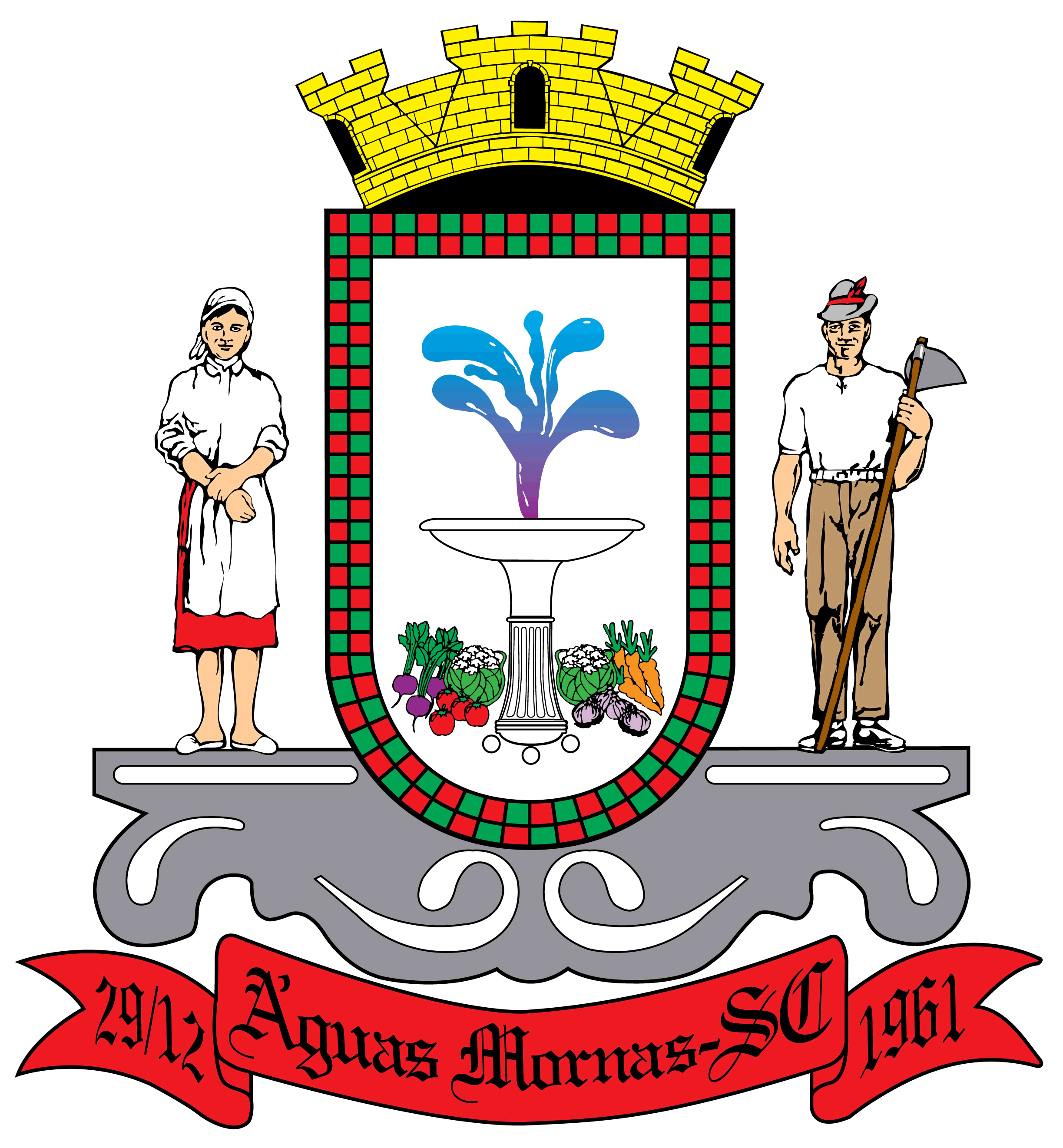
- Flag Coat of arms

- Location of Águas Mornas

- Location within Brazil
- Coordinates: 27°41′38″S 48°49′26″W
- Country: Brazil
- Region: South
- State: (Santa Catarina (state)) Santa Catarina
- Founded: December 29, 1961

Government
  - Mayor: Elmar Antônio Thiesen (PFL)

Area
  - Total: 360.757 km^{2} (139.289 sq mi)
- Elevation: 70 m (230 ft)

Population (2020)
  - Total: 6,559
  - Density: 12.4/km^{2} (32/sq mi)
- Time zone: UTC−3 (BRT)
- HDI (2000): 0.783
- Website: www.aguasmornas.sc.gov.br

Águas Mornas is a Brazilian municipality in the state of Santa Catarina.

The municipality contains part of the Rio das Lontras Private Natural Heritage Reserve, a fully protected area of montane rainforest in the Atlantic Forest biome. It also contains part of the 84,130-hectare (207,900-acre) Serra do Tabuleiro State Park, a protected area created in 1975. The lushly-forested park protects the sources of the Vargem do Braço, Cubatão and D'Una rivers, which supply most of the drinking water for greater Florianópolis and the south coast region.
