= São Martinho, Santa Catarina =

Coordinates: 28°09′54″S 48°58′44″W

- Municipality
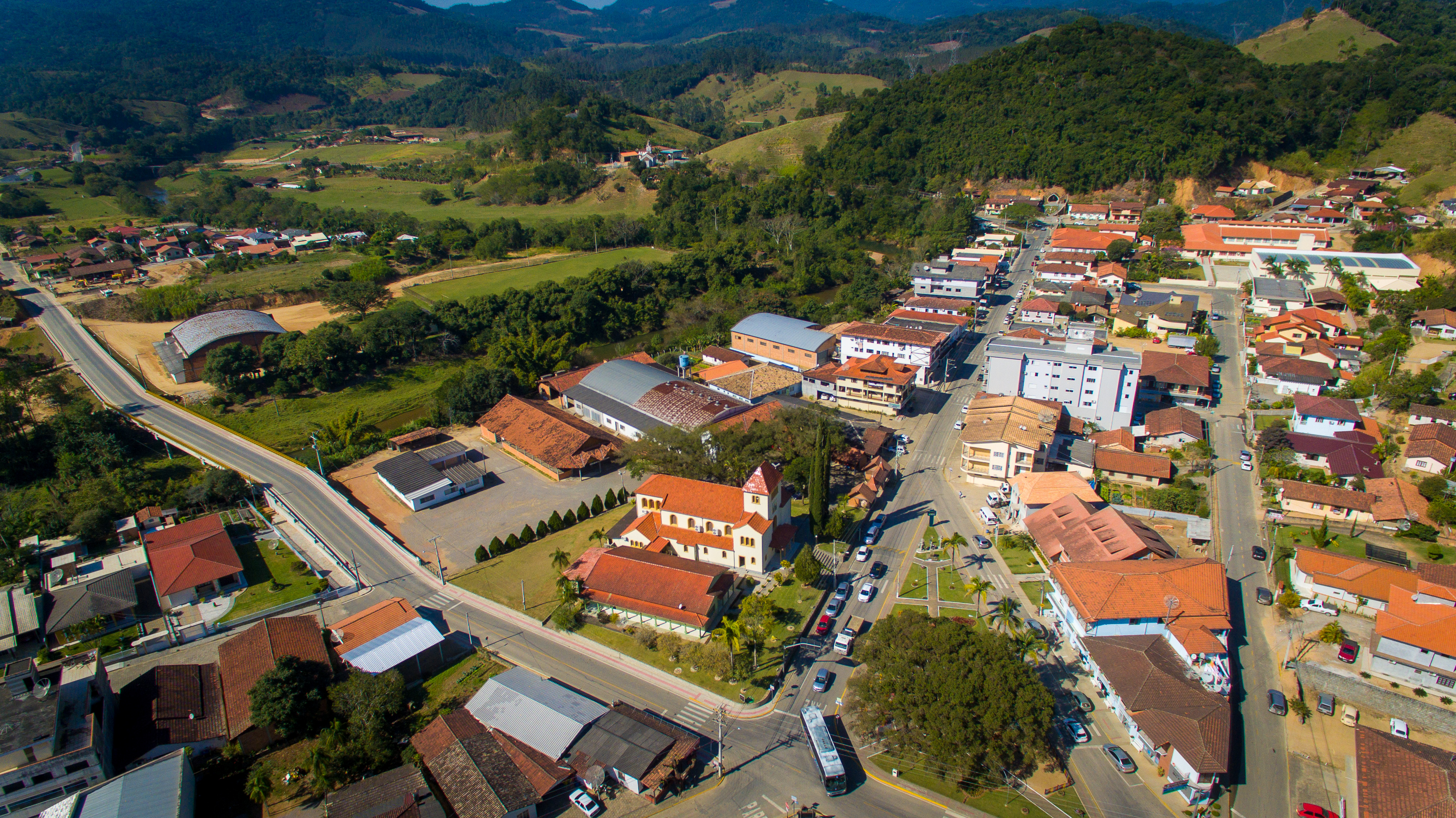

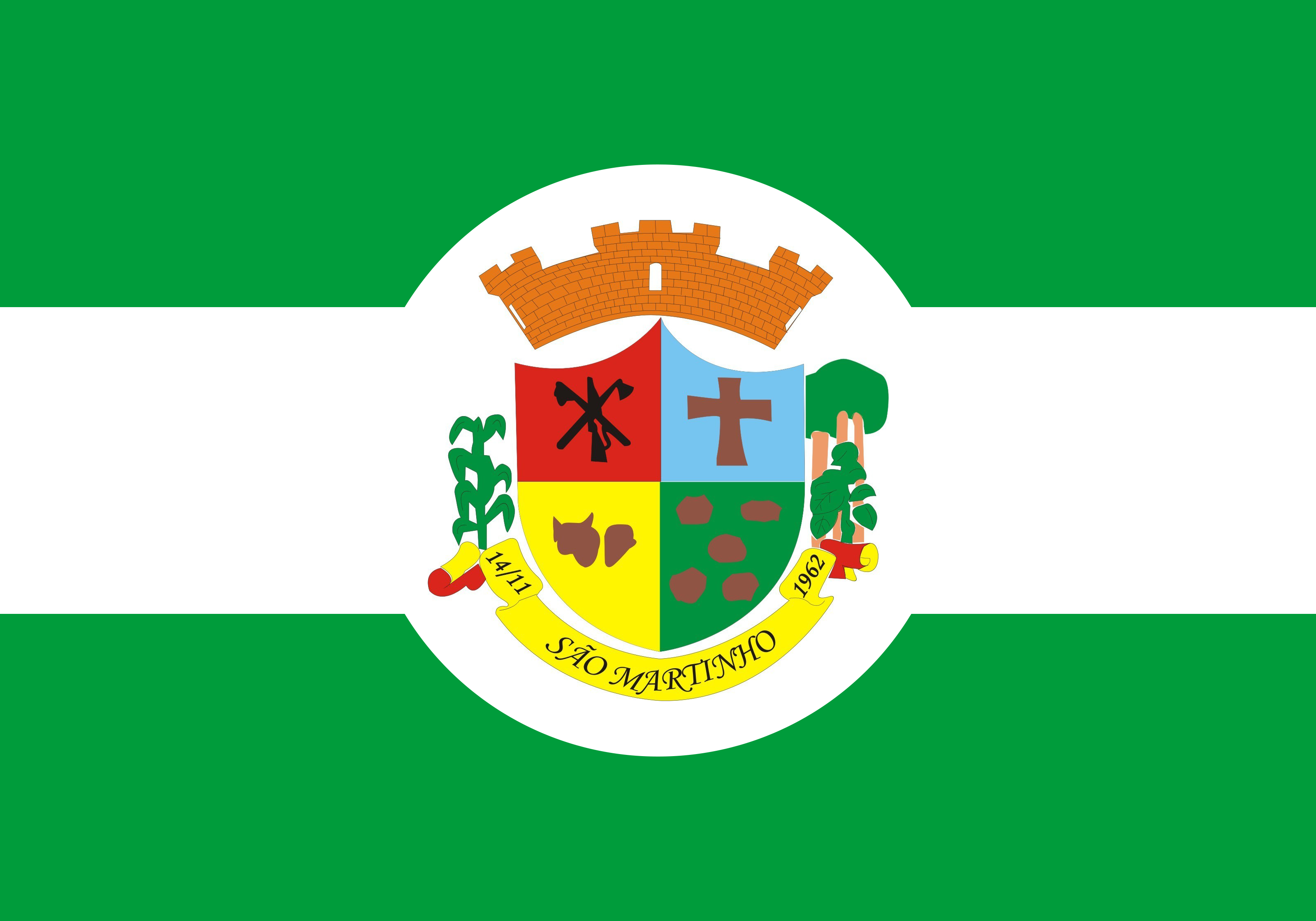
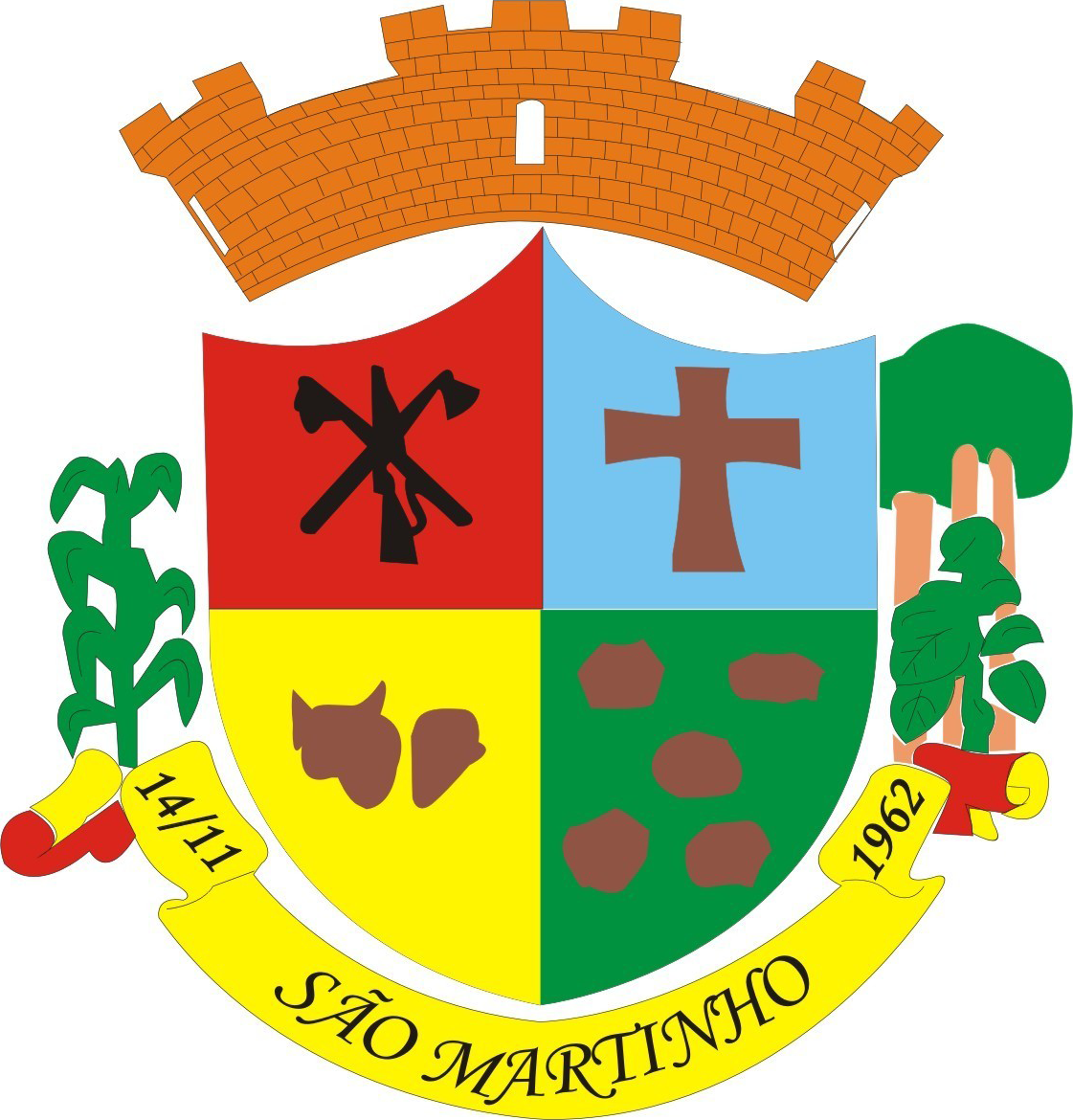
- Flag Coat of arms

- Location in Santa Caterina
- Country: Brazil
- Region: South
- State: Santa Catarina
- Mesoregion: Sul Catarinense

Population (2020)
  - Total: 3,171
- Time zone: UTC -3
- Website: www.saomartinho.sc.gov.br

São Martinho is a municipality in the state of Santa Catarina in the Southern region of Brazil.

The municipality contains part of the 84,130 hectares (207,900 acres) Serra do Tabuleiro State Park, a protected area created in 1975. The lushly-forested park protects the sources of the Vargem do Braço, Cubatão and D'Una rivers, which supply most of the drinking water for greater Florianópolis and the south coast region.

Venerable Aloísio Sebastião Boeing was born there.

== See also ==
- List of municipalities in Santa Catarina
