= Paulo Lopes =

- Municipality
- The Municipality of Paulo Lopes
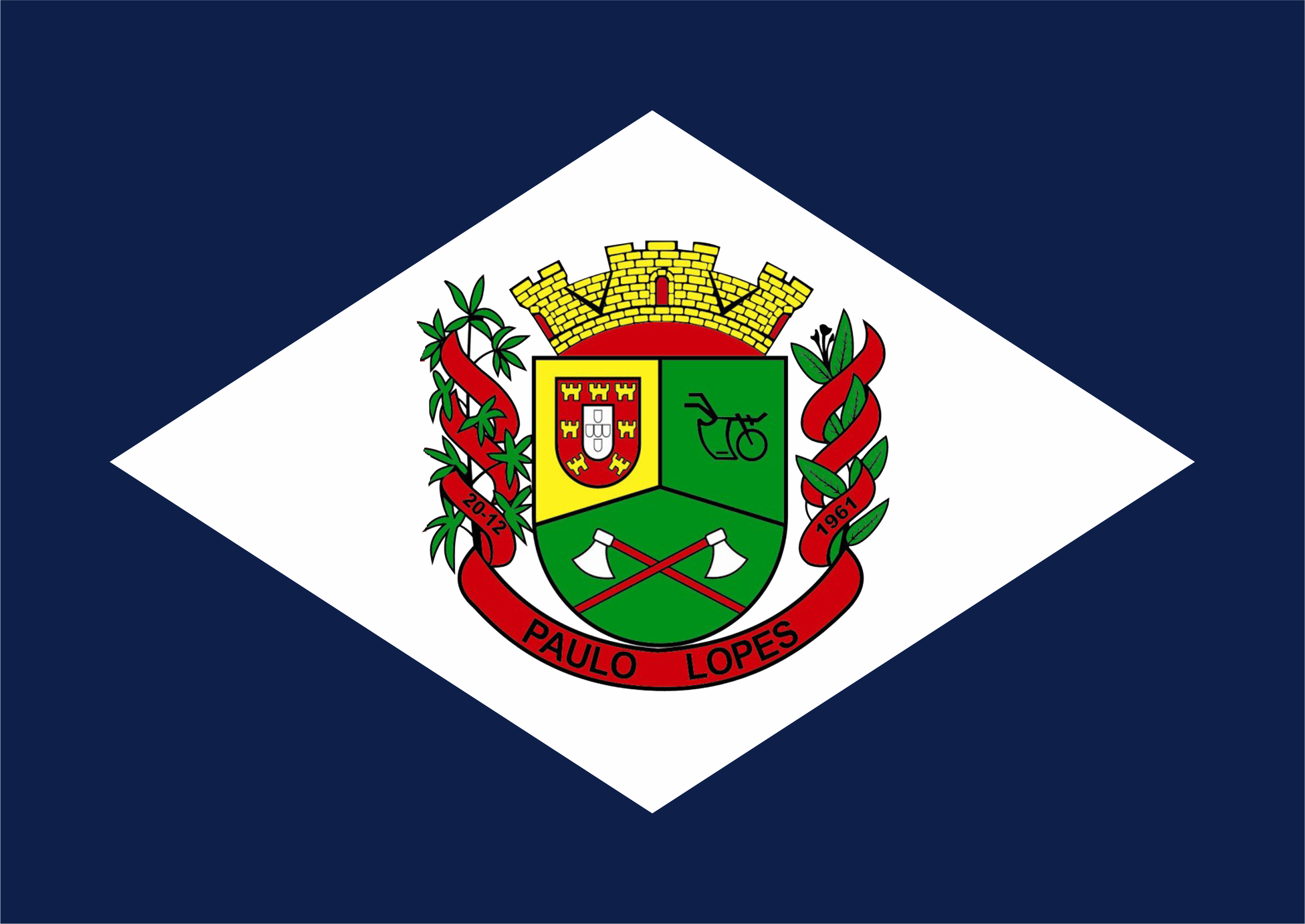
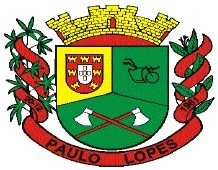
- Flag Coat of arms

- Location of Paulo Lopes in Santa Catarina state
- Coordinates: 27°57′43″S 48°41′02″W
- Country: Brazil
- Region: South
- State: Santa Catarina
- Founded: December 21, 1961

Government
  - Mayor: Evandro João dos Santos (PMDB)

Area
  - Total: 450.372 km^{2} (173.890 sq mi)
- Elevation: 2 m (6.6 ft)

Population (2020)
  - Total: 7,569
  - Density: 16.81/km^{2} (43.53/sq mi)
- Time zone: UTC−3 (BRT)
- HDI (2000): 0.759 – medium

Paulo Lopes is a municipality in the state of Santa Catarina in the South region of Brazil.

The municipality contains part of the 84,130-hectare (207,900-acre) Serra do Tabuleiro State Park, a protected area created in 1975. The lushly-forested park protects the sources of the Vargem do Braço, Cubatão and D'Una rivers, which supply most of the drinking water for greater Florianópolis and the south coast region.

== See also ==
- List of municipalities in Santa Catarina
