= Armazém =

Municipality in Santa Catarina, Brazil

- Municipality
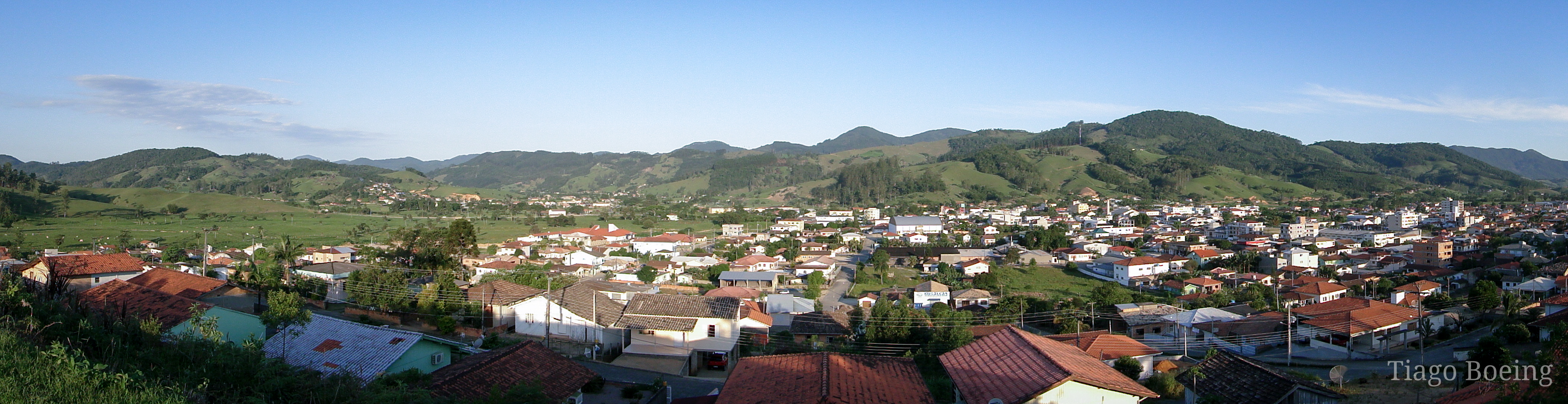
- Panoramic view of Armazém

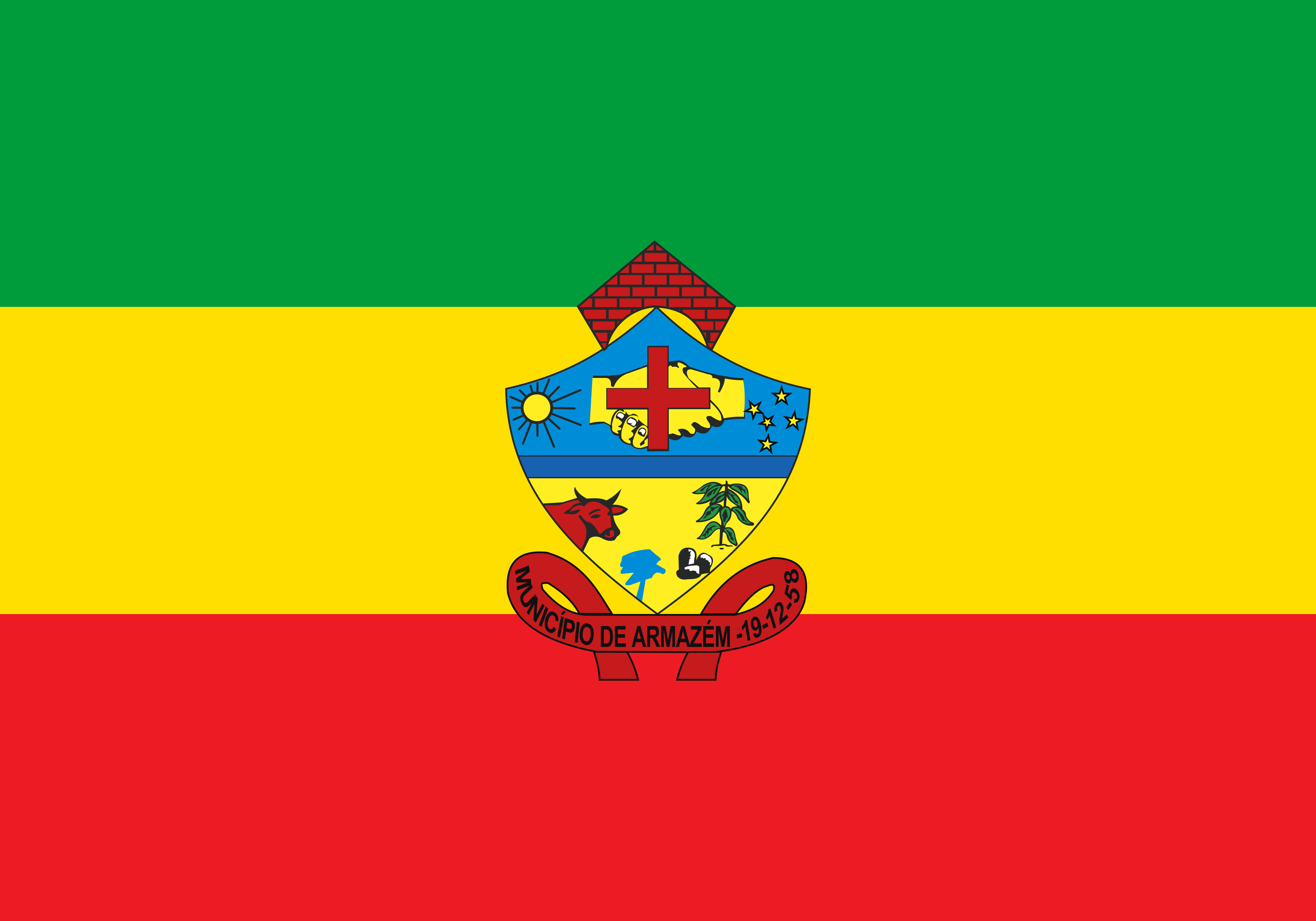
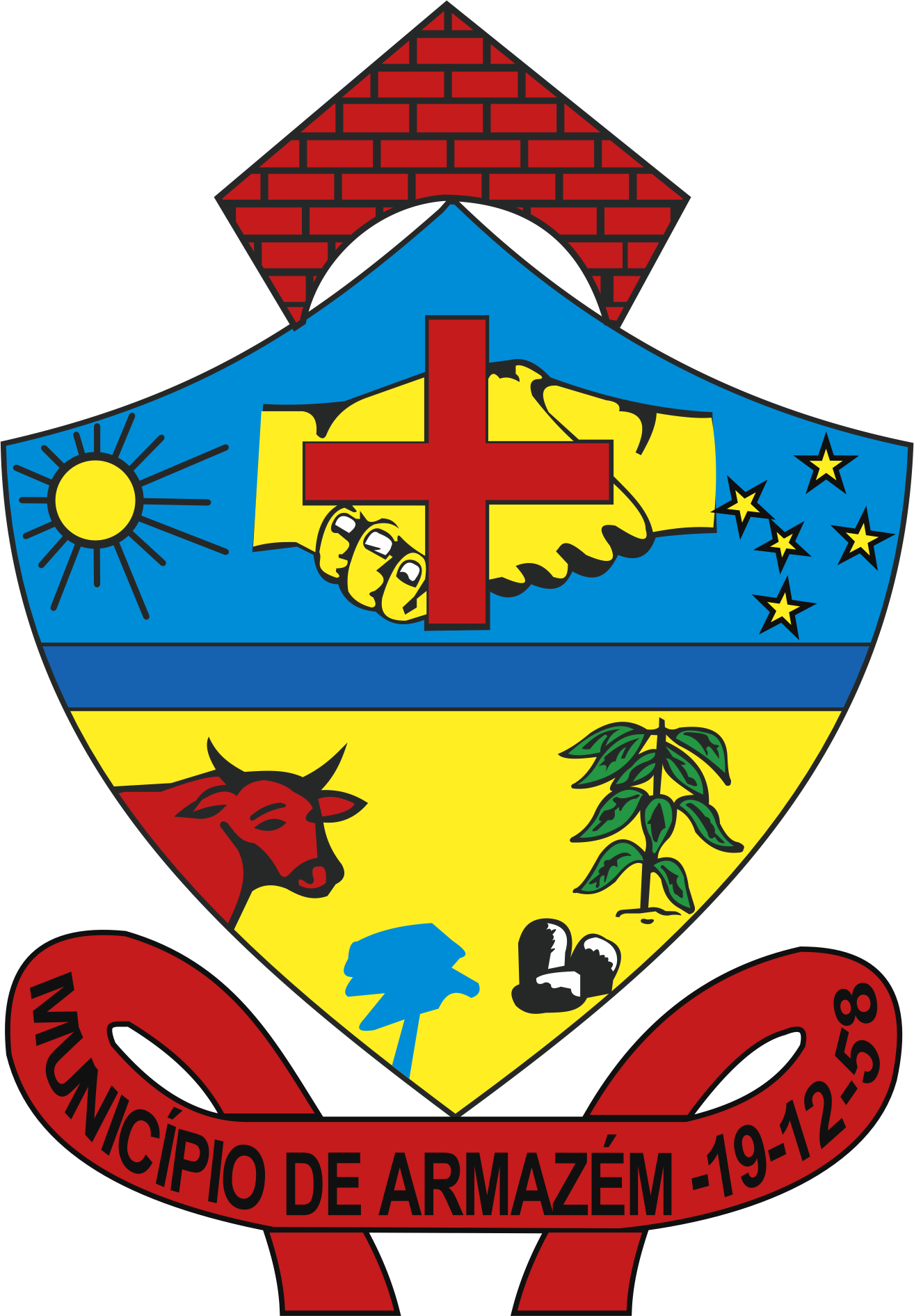
- Flag Coat of arms
- Etymology: Name of a small trading house
- Location in the state of Santa Catarina

- Location within Brazil Location within South America
- Coordinates: 28°15′43″S 49°1′3″W
- Country: Brazil
- Region: South
- State: Santa Catarina
- Founded: 19 December 1958

Government
  - Mayor: Luiz Paulo Rodrigues Mendes (PSD) (2025-2028)
  - Vice Mayor: Gilherme José Heerdt Corrêa (PL) (2025-2028)

Area
  - Total: 173.96 km^{2} (67.17 sq mi)
- Elevation: 30 m (98 ft)

Population (2022)
  - Total: 8,834
  - Density: 50.78/km^{2} (131.5/sq mi)
- Demonym: Armazenense (Brazilian Portuguese)
- Time zone: UTC-03:00 (Brasília Time)
- Postal code: 88740-000
- HDI (2010): 0.770 – high
- Website: armazem.sc.gov.br

Armazém is a municipality in the Brazilian state of Santa Catarina. Is located at latitude 28º15'43" south and longitude 49º01'03" west, with an elevation of 30 meters. The city's streets are embellished with manicured gardens. Armazém has an area of 138.6 km^{2} and was emancipated from the city of Tubarão on 19 December 1958.

== Municipal Data ==
- Municípios limítrofes: Braço do Norte, Rio Fortuna, São Martinho, Imarui e Gravatal.
- Área: 173,578 km^{2}
- Population: 8,759 (2020)
- Altitude: 30 m
- Tourist Region: Encantos do Sul
- Mais informações você encontra no site da prefeitura municipal de Armazém
