= Aloísio Sebastião Boeing =

Brazilian Priest Venerable

Venerable Aloísio Sebastião Boeing SCI
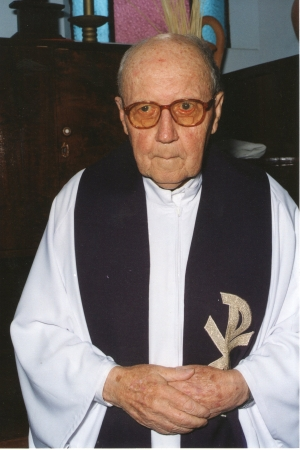
- Venerable Aloísio Sebastião Boeing
- Born: 24 December 1913; Vargem do Cedro, Brazil
- Died: 17 April 2006 (aged 92); Jaraguá do Sul, Brazil

Aloísio Sebastião Boeing (24 December 1913 – 17 April 2006), was a Catholic Dehonian priest from the Diocese of Joinville. On February 23, 2023, Pope Francis recognized his heroic virtue.

== Biography ==
=== First years ===
Aloísio Sebastião Boeing was born on December 24, 1913 (Wednesday), in Vargem do Cedro (Santa Catarina), at that time a district of Imaruí, today belonging to São Martinho. Firstborn of a German Catholic family, he was baptized on December 26 of the same year and confirmed on January 22, 1914, in the Parish of São Sebastião, Vargem do Cedro. His parents João Boeing and Josephina Effting Boeing, attended mass and prayed the rosary daily. It was in this environment that Boeing developed his life and personality in childhood: in a home of practicing Catholic parents.

At the age of twelve, on February 11, 1925, encouraged by the parish priest, he left his homeland with three other colleagues, to the priesthood.

=== At the seminary ===
The stages of their formation took place basically in Brusque and Taubaté (state of São Paulo). The first religious profession took place in Brusque on 16 January 1934. Theology studies were done in Taubaté from 1938 to 1941.

He was ordained a priest on December 1, 1940 (Sunday).

=== Priesthood ===
As a priest, Boeing dedicated much of his life to formation, especially in Jaraguá do Sul. In his convent, he was a novice master for 24 years. He became a trainer with a reputation as a firm, devout, and zealous. He had great devotion to the Virgin Mary. On his initiative, this novitiate was named after Our Lady of Fátima. Boeing was esteemed, distinguished by his kindness and paternal welcome from the students who sought him for spiritual guidance.

Boeing has always worked in the field of pastoral care. From the beginning of his priestly life, he was also sought by the people for spiritual counseling until the end of his life. That was the skill he developed throughout his life.

Often, until dawn, he was sought after at home or by telephone for spiritual guidance, family counseling, and health blessing. He never stopped answering. At the end of his life, often sick, in bed, he attended, lying down, to the most urgent cases. He felt compassion for the people, especially the sick, the elderly and the poor. He had a special talent for conversation on spiritual things and would discuss and listen attentively tirelessly.

== Death and legacy ==
Father Aloísio died on April 17, 2006. Feeling close to his departure and feeling leave to everyone he loved, said: "You will find me in the Eucharist." He was buried in the garden, next to the Church of Our Lady of the Rosary, in the Nereu Ramos neighborhood, in Jaraguá do Sul. People testify to having already achieved thanks for his intercession. Every 17th of each month, remembering the day of his death, the Mass of Mercy is celebrated at 3:00 p.m. "We have lost a very dear priest, but we have won a saint in heaven!", remarked Osnildo Klann, a fellow Dehonian.

=== Beatification ===
Boeing's beatification process was opened in 2013 by the then diocesan bishop, Bishop Irineu Roque Scherer. The diocesan phase was closed in 2015.

=== Biographical documentary ===
On December 1, 2020, the date of the 80th anniversary of the priestly ordination of Boeing, those responsible for his process of recognition of holiness released a free documentary, lasting 0:53:40, The Daily Holiness. It was made available via YouTube.
