= Albertina Berkenbrock =

Brazilian virgin and Blessed (1919–1931)

Blessed Albertina Berkenbrock

Virgin and martyr
- Born: 11 April 1919; São Luís, Imaruí, Santa Catarina, Brazil
- Died: 15 June 1931 (aged 12); São Luís, Imaruí, Santa Catarina, Brazil
- Venerated in: Catholic Church
- Beatified: 20 October 2007, Tubarão Cathedral, Brazil by Cardinal José Saraiva Martins (on behalf of Pope Benedict XVI)
- Feast: 15 June

Albertina Berkenbrock (11 April 1919 – 15 June 1931) was a Brazilian Catholic girl killed "in defensum castitatis" ("in defence of chastity") in 1931 after she resisted her attacker's rape attempts. Berkenbrock was of German descent on both sides and she worked on the family farm. A devoutly religious girl, she frequently attended Mass and taught catechism to other children.

The different phases of the cause for Albertina's beatification came to fruition with the solemn beatification ceremony held on 20 October 2007.

== Life ==
Albertina Berkenbrock was born in Imaruí in Brazil on 11 April 1919, one of nine children of devout farm workers Johann Hermann and Elisabeth Schmöller. Her grandparents immigrated from Schöppingen to Brazil and brought with them their three children one of who was Johann Hermann.

The baby was baptized on 25 May 1919 and was to receive Confirmation on 9 March 1925. On 16 August 1928 she made her First Communion which was an experience that she herself described as the most beautiful event in her entire life. Albertina also fostered a special devotion to the Mother of God and to Aloysius Gonzaga who was the patron saint of São Luís. Her teachers praised her behaviour and her generous nature. It was noted that she never retaliated against other children, including her brothers, who teased her or taunted her as children do.

On 15 June 1931, Maneco Palhoça, who worked for her father, tried to rape Albertina. The girl had been searching for a bullock that had strayed and she came across Maneco who was loading beans into a cart. When she asked if he had seen the animal, Maneco pointed her in the wrong direction to a wooded area, where he planned to attack her. Following his directions, the girl heard twigs cracking, and thought at first that this was the bullock, but was petrified when she saw Maneco had followed her. The girl fought back, and her attacker, realizing that the attack would not succeed and that he would be reported, grabbed her hair and slit her throat with a knife. Despite his attempts to cover up the crime he was suspected by the people and soon arrested. It is said that each time Maneco was taken near the girl's corpse the blood from her neck gushed as a sign he was the culprit. He confessed to the crime along with two other previous murders. Tried and convicted, he was given a life sentence. In prison he admitted to fellow prisoners that he had murdered the girl because she resisted his rape attempts. Her remains were later relocated in 2002.

== Beatification ==
The beatification process opened in Tubarão with an informative process that spanned from 30 December 1954 until the latter part of 2001; the Congregation for the Causes of Saints validated this process in Rome on 18 January 2002. The formal phase of the cause was introduced under Pope John Paul II on 2 October 2001 and Albertina Berkenbrock was given the title Servant of God. The Congregation received the official Positio dossier from the postulation in 2002 for assessment. On 26 September 2006 a panel of theologians made a positive report on the cause, confirmed then by the Congregation on 21 November 2006, while on 16 December 2006 Pope Benedict XVI approved the determination that Albertina Berkenbrock had been killed "in defensum castitatis", giving his authorization for her beatification.

Cardinal José Saraiva Martins presided over the solemn beatification ceremony on the pope's behalf in Brazil on 20 October 2007.

The current postulator for the cause is Paolo Vilotta.
