= Ricardo dos Santos =

Ricardo dos Santos may refer to:

- Ricardo dos Santos (surfer) (1990-2015), Brazilian surfer
- Ricardo dos Santos (athlete) (born 1994), Portuguese sprinter
