= Rio Fortuna =

Coordinates: 28°06′S 49°07′W

- Municipality
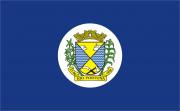
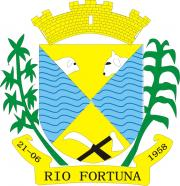
- Flag Coat of arms

- Rio Fortuna in Santa Catarina
- Country: Brazil
- Region: South
- State: Santa Catarina
- Mesoregion: Sul Catarinense

Area
  - Total: 115.952 sq mi (300.315 km^{2})
- Elevation: 430 ft (130 m)

Population (2020)
  - Total: 4,620
- Time zone: UTC -3

Rio Fortuna is a municipality in the state of Santa Catarina in the South region of Brazil.

== History ==
Indigenous people belonging to the Xokleng tribe were the first inhabitants of the municipality.

The colonization of the lands that now belong to Rio Fortuna began around 1872, with children of immigrants who came mostly from São Bonifácio and, in smaller numbers, descendants of Germans from Anitápolis, Tubarão and São Pedro do Sul (present-day Armazém).

On 15 April 1909, through Decree No. 789, Rio Fortuna became a district belonging to the municipality of Imaruí, and at that time the locality developed little due to its distance from the municipal seat.

On 3 January 1921, with the signing of Law No. 107, the district of Rio Fortuna was created, now belonging to the municipality of Tubarão, and the district came to have an intendant.

By Decree-Law No. 86 of 31 March 1938, the seat was elevated to the category of vila ("town") of Tubarão.

By State Law No. 1,022 of 30 December 1953, Rio Fortuna became a district of the newly created municipality of Braço do Norte, and while it belonged to the neighboring city, Rio Fortuna gained the right to representatives in the city council.

On 21 June 1958, through State Law No. 348, Rio Fortuna was emancipated, gaining administrative independence and increased funding. Adolfo Boeing was appointed interim mayor for six months, until Marcos Vandresen was elected to the office.

== Economy ==
The economic base of the municipality is centered on family farming and livestock (mainly dairy farming, with the municipality being one of the largest producers of milk in the state), with notable cultivation of tobacco, maize, beans, and forests of pine and eucalyptus.

Its economy once depended solely on agriculture, but today it is also based on the extraction of fluorite, a mineral for which the municipality has one of the largest reserves. Fluorite has significant economic value because, besides its use in the steel industry, it is the main source of fluorine for the chemical industry; as well as in pisciculture and in the manufacturing industry, including dairy industries (the most important economic chain in the municipality) and the wood processing industry.

== Geography ==
The municipality has an area of 300.315 square kilometres.

According to the IBGE census, in 2010 the municipality had a population of 4,446 inhabitants.

The rivers that run through the municipality and deserve mention are the Braço do Norte River, Fortuna River, Claro River, Bravo River, Branco River, Café River, Otília River, Facão River, dos Bugres River, Chapéu River, Espraiado River, Areão River and Azedo River.

== See also ==
- List of municipalities in Santa Catarina
