= Imaruí =

Coordinates: 28°21′S 48°49′W

- Municipality
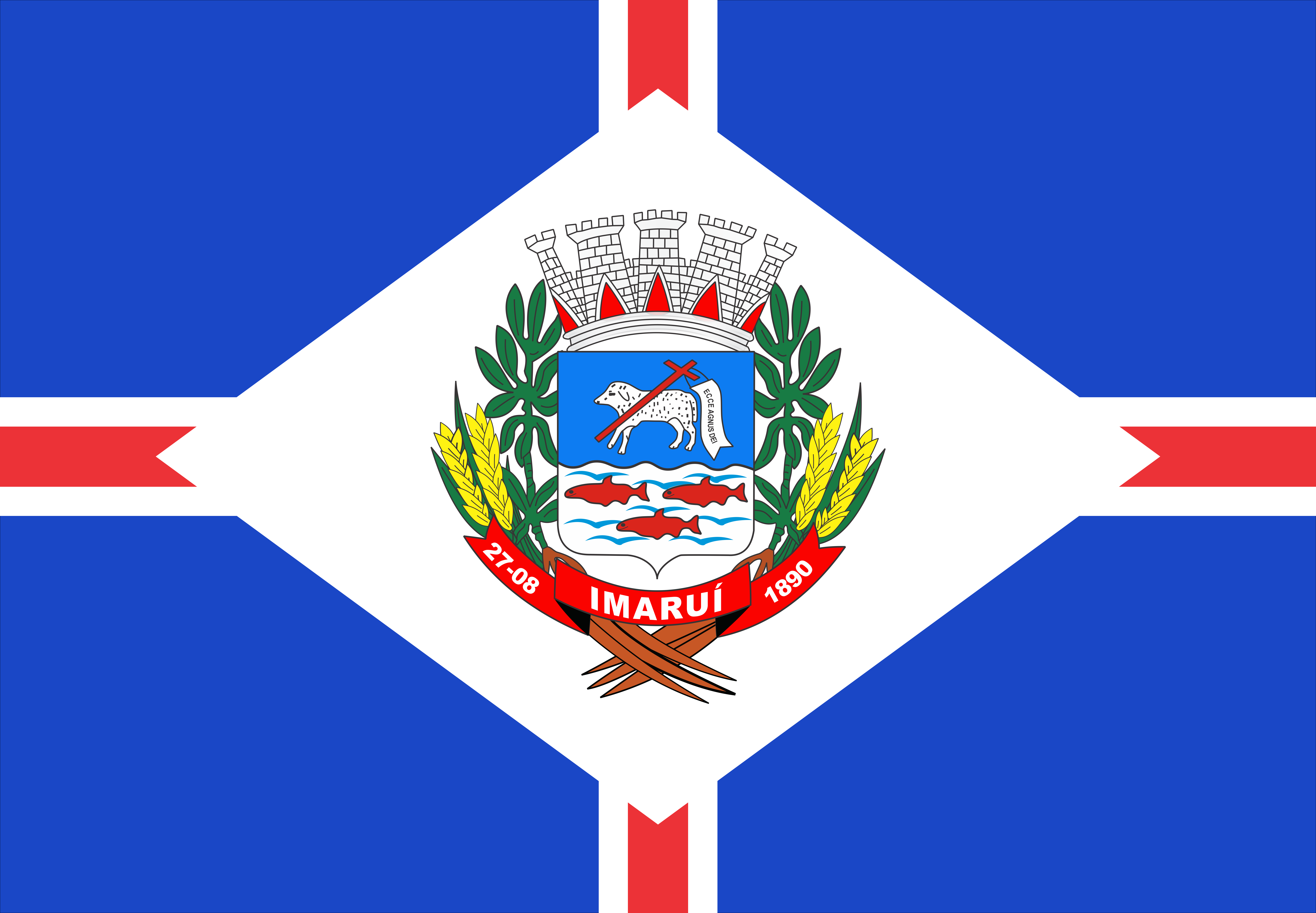
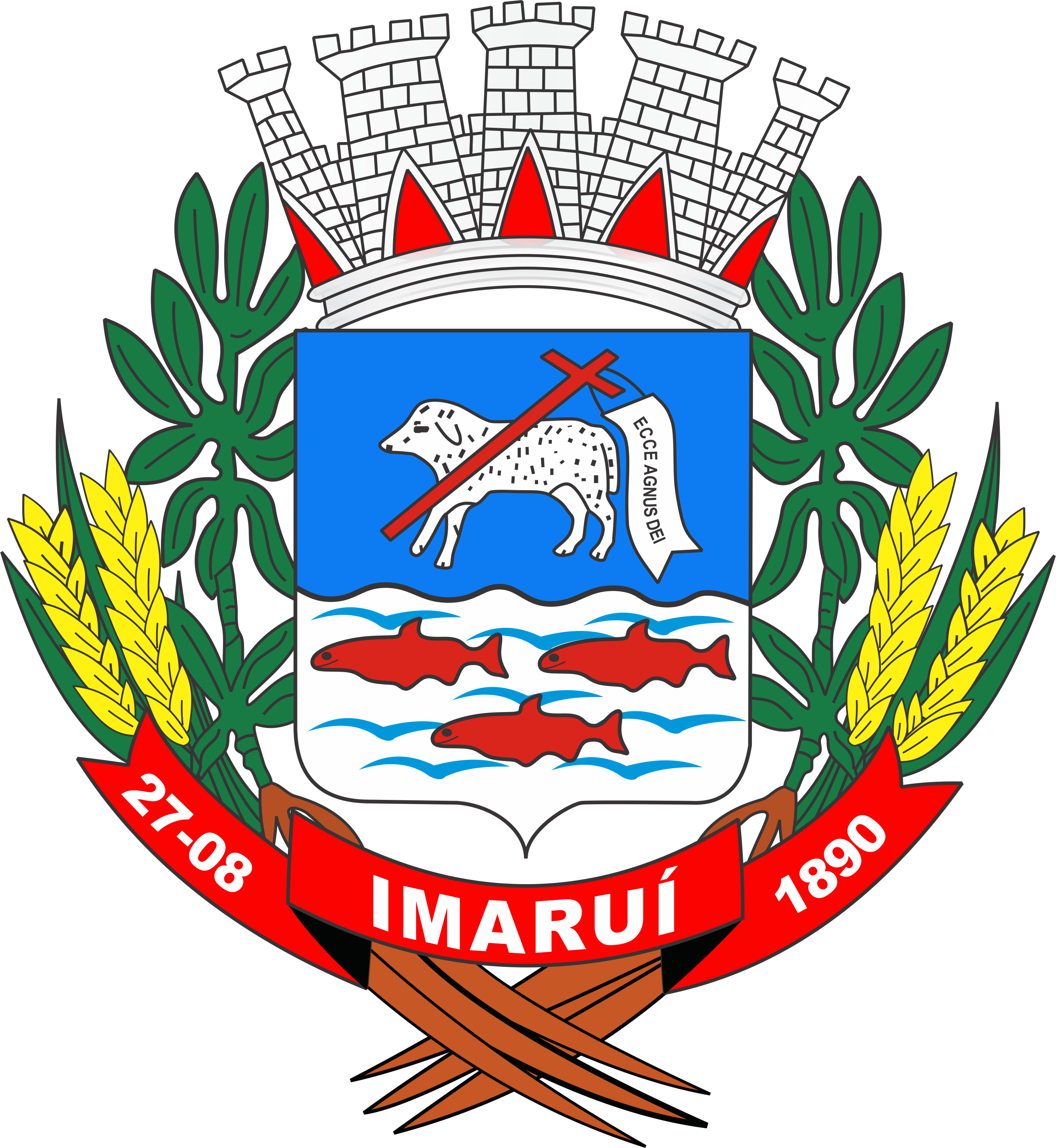
- Flag Coat of arms

- Location in Santa Caterina
- Country: Brazil
- Region: South
- State: Santa Catarina
- Mesoregion: Sul Catarinense

Population (2020)
  - Total: 9,948
- Time zone: UTC -3

Imaruí is a municipality in the state of Santa Catarina in the South region of Brazil.

The municipality contains part of the 84,130 hectares (207,900 acres) Serra do Tabuleiro State Park, a protected area created in 1975. The lushly-forested park protects the sources of the Vargem do Braço, Cubatão and D'Una rivers, which supply most of the drinking water for greater Florianópolis and the south coast region.

== See also ==
- List of municipalities in Santa Catarina
