= São Pedro de Alcântara, Santa Catarina =

- Municipality
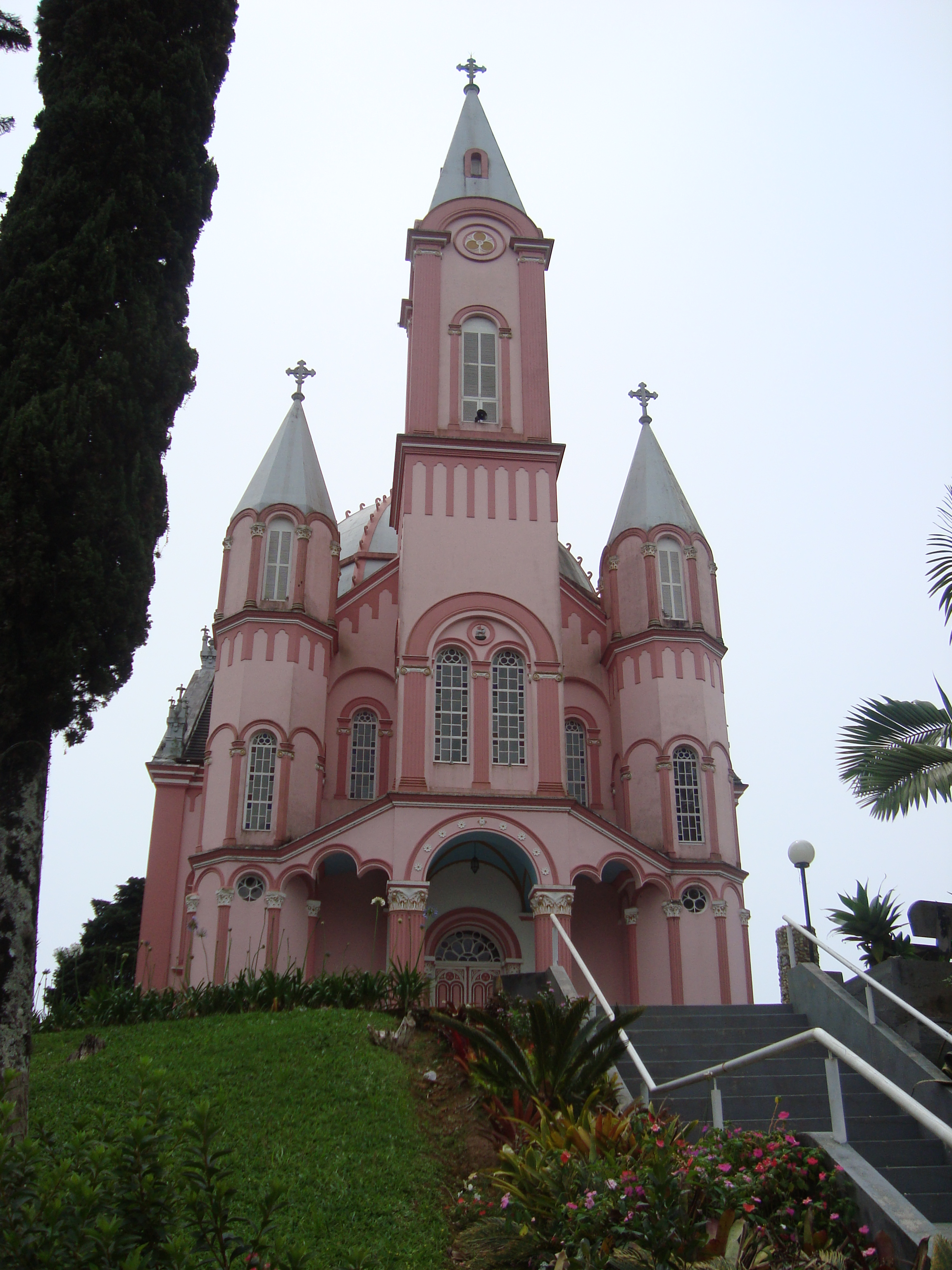

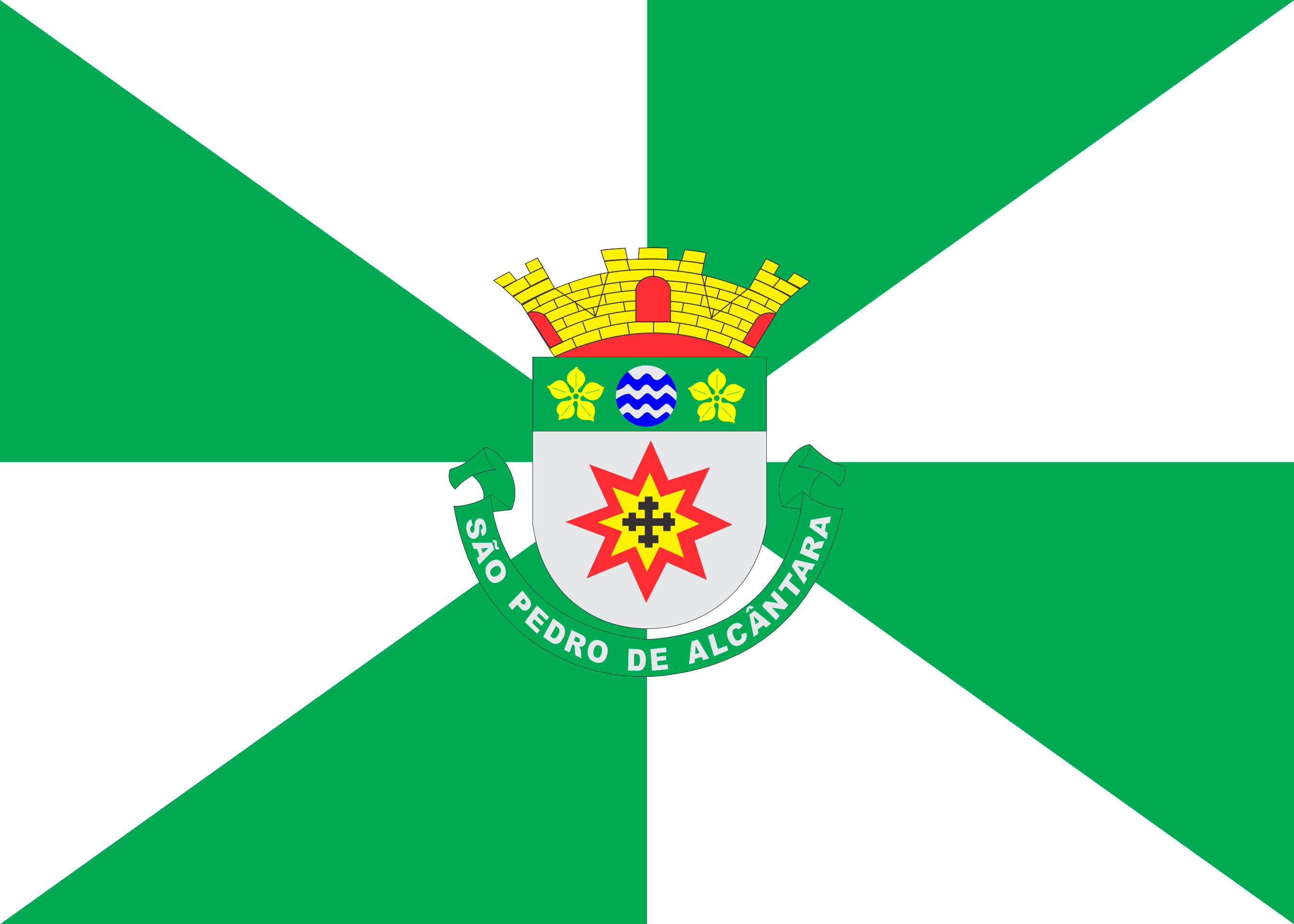
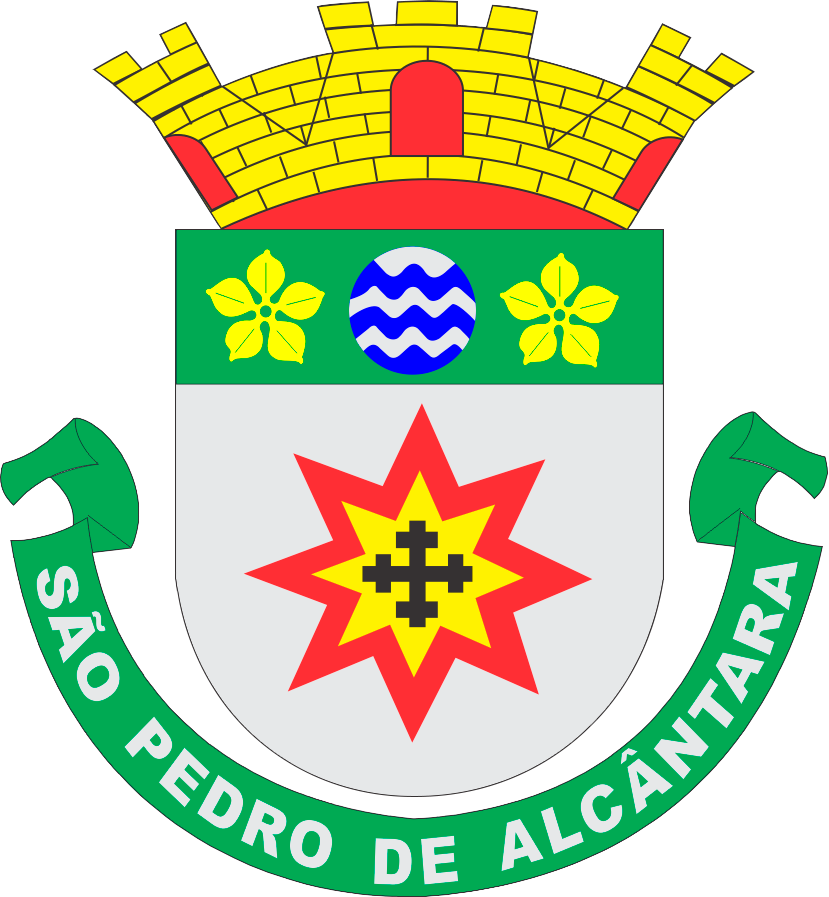
- Flag Coat of arms

- Location within Brazil
- Coordinates: 27.566°S 48.805°W
- Country: Brazil
- Region: South
- State: Santa Catarina
- Mesoregion: Grande Florianópolis

Government
  - Mayor: Ernei José Stähelin

Population (2020)
  - Total: 5,935
- Time zone: UTC -3
- Website: www.pmspa.sc.gov.br

São Pedro de Alcântara, Santa Catarina is a municipality in the state of Santa Catarina in the South region of Brazil.

The municipality contains part of the Rio das Lontras Private Natural Heritage Reserve, a fully protected area of montane rainforest in the Atlantic Forest biome.

== German influence ==
On 1 March 1829 the first German speaking colony of the state of Santa Catarina was founded, receiving the Portuguese name of Colônia São Pedro de Alcântara, located not too far from the state's capital, Desterro, having its name changed in modern times to Florianópolis. Initially the colony did not experience great success when compared to other similar federal, state, or private enterprises, but with time it got incorporated into Florianópolis, a modern and thriving Brazilian metropolitan area. The state of Santa Catarina has a highest percentage of German descent people compared to all other Brazilian states.

== See also ==
- List of municipalities in Santa Catarina
- São Leopoldo, in the neighboring state of Rio Grande do Sul, founded in 1824 by the first pioneer German speaking families to settle permanently in Brazil, is officially considered the cradle of German-Brazilian culture (see the Riograndenser Hunsrückisch German language of South America).
