= Ricardo dos Santos (surfer) =

Brazilian surfer

Personal information
- Nickname: Ricardinho
- Born: Ricardo dos Santos; May 23, 1990 Palhoça, Santa Catarina
- Died: January 20, 2015 (aged 24) São José, Santa Catarina

Surfing career
- Sport: Surfing
- Sponsors: Billabong

Ricardo dos Santos (23 May 1990 – 20 January 2015) was a Brazilian surfer. Dos Santos reached the quarterfinals at the 2012 Billabong Pro event in Tahiti in defeating among others Kelly Slater. At the aforementioned Tahitian tourney he was also presented with the Andy Irons award, bestowed upon the event's most determined competitor. He reached a career high Association of Surfing Professionals QS ranking of 62 in 2011.

Dos Santos was shot dead on January 20, 2015, by an off duty police officer outside his home in southern Brazil close to the city of Florianópolis. He was 24. The officer involved in his death was sentenced to 22 years in prison. It later emerged that Dos Santos was shot in the back. Over one thousand people attended the surfer's funeral.
