= Greater Florianópolis =

Coordinates: 27.592892°S 48.552361°W

Mesoregion Grande Florianópolis

Grande Florianópolis is a mesoregion in the Brazilian state of Santa Catarina, with its core city being Florianópolis.
