= Serra do Tabuleiro State Park =

State park in Santa Catarina, Brazil

- Parque Estadual da Serra do Tabuleiro
- IUCN category II (national park)
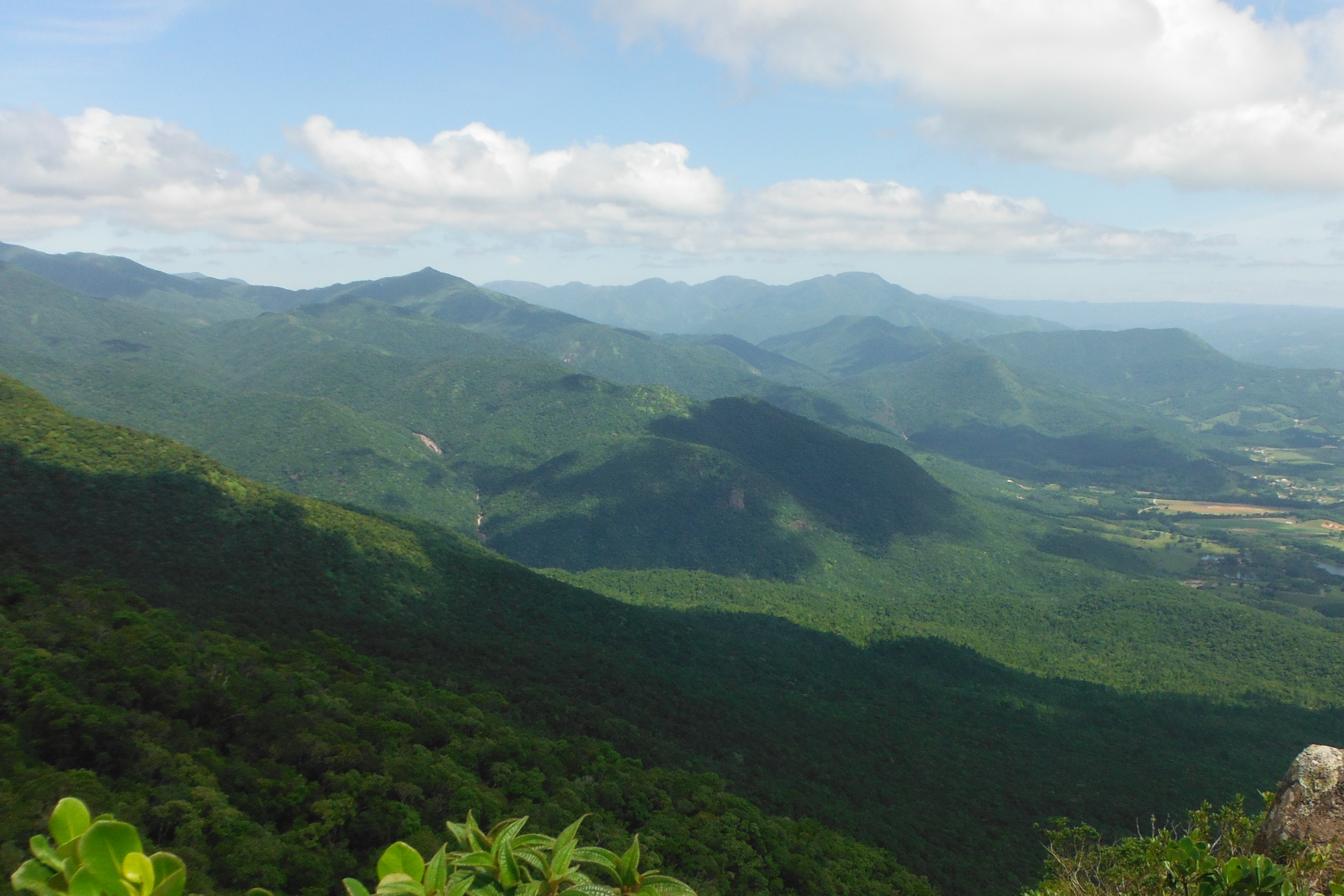
- Serra do Tabuleiro hills in the Atlantic Forest

- Location within Brazil
- Nearest city: São José, Santa Catarina
- Coordinates: 27°54′50″S 48°48′18″W
- Area: 84,130 hectares (207,900 acres)
- Designation: State park
- Created: 1975
- Administrator: FATMA: Fundação do meio Ambiente

Serra do Tabuleiro State Park (Portuguese: Parque Estadual da Serra do Tabuleiro) is a state park in the state of Santa Catarina, Brazil. It protects a mountainous area near the city of Florianópolis, covered in Atlantic Forest, which is an important source of drinking water. It also protects some coastal islands. The park is used for scientific research, education and eco-tourism.

== Location ==
The Serra do Tabuleiro State Park is named after the Serra do Tabuleiro, a tabular mountain that is a prominent feature. The Serra do Tabuleiro is one of Santa Catarina's Eastern Mountain Ranges, others being the Mar de Morros and part of the Serra do Mar. It covers an area of 84,130 hectares (207,900 acres) in the municipalities of Florianópolis, Palhoça, Santo Amaro da Imperatriz, Águas Mornas, São Bonifácio, São Martinho, Imaruí and Paulo Lopes. It includes the islands of Fortaleza/Araçatuba, Andrade, Papagaio Pequeno, Três Irmãs, Moleques do Sul, Siriú, Coral, Cardos and the south tip of Santa Catarina Island.

The park was established by decree 1.260 in 1975. The purpose was to protect the rich biodiversity of the region and the water sources for greater Florianópolis, Santa Catarina. The lush forests protect the sources of the Vargem do Braço, Cubatão and D'Una rivers, which supply most of the drinking water for greater Florianópolis and the south coast region. The basin of the Massiambu River is fully contained within the park.

== Environment ==
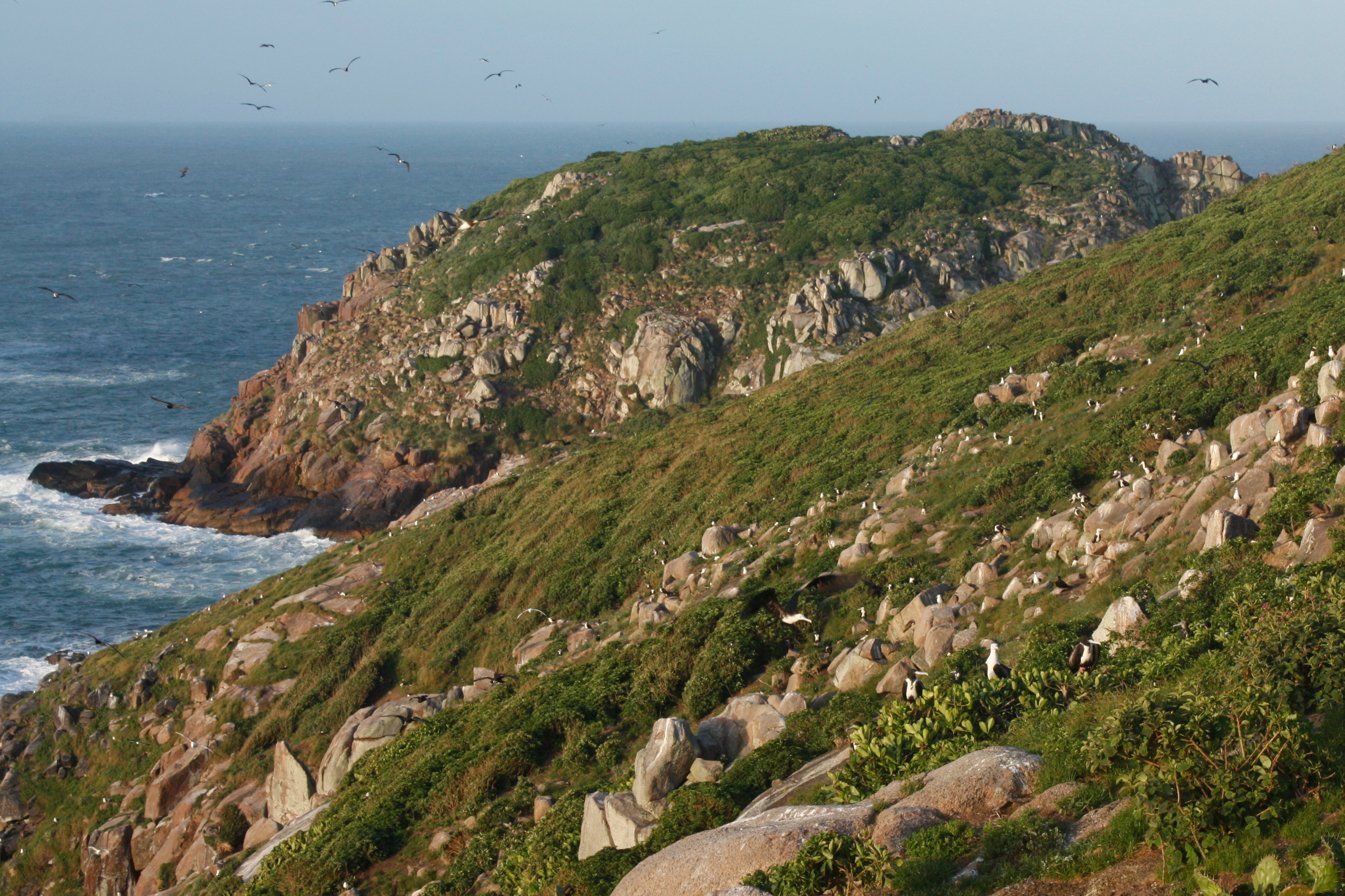
Moleques do Sul islands.

When the state park was created the environmental authorities expelled some traditional fishing and farming families. Others were allowed to stay under strict conditions for land use. Comparison of aerial photographs of the portion of the park in Florianopolis from 1957 and 1998 show after the abandonment of farming there has been substantial regeneration of the forest.

The park contains five of the six main plant formations of the Atlantic Forest biome. The coastal area contains salt marshes and mangroves. The mountains are mostly covered in dense rainforest rich in epiphytes. The upper slopes, shrouded in fog from the moist Atlantic air, holds cloud forest. The highest parts hold rainforest with Araucaria and alpine meadows. Each region has its own special fauna and flora, as do the coastal islands. The park contains the Baixada do Maciambu, a formation of semi-circular sand ridges formed by fluctuations in sea levels over the years and considered an important geological monument.

== Visitors ==
The park is readily accessible to residents of the nearby urban areas, and supports eco-tourism and environmental education as well as scientific research. The Praia dos Naufragados beach on the tip of Santa Catarina Island has become a tourism and recreation site. It can be reached by boat or by hiking along a trail through the secondary-growth forest. The hike from the end of the bus line takes about two hours each way along a path through subtropical rainforest thick with vines.

The headquarters and visitor centre are in Palhoça and there are two thematic centres in the municipal seats of Imarui and São Bonifácio. The headquarters is on the BR-101 coastal highway, 40 kilometres (25 mi) south of Florianópolis, and was opened on 6 June 1978. The visitor's centre includes a conference room and a gazebo from which the tops of the trees can be viewed. There is a 1 kilometre (0.62 mi) ecological trail where visitors are given guided tours. There is a program to restore the animals that once lived in the Baixada do Massiambu but have since vanished. Animals such as tapirs and capybaras that have been taken from hunters are held in semi-captivity in preparation for release.

== Sources ==
- Baptista, Sandra Regina (2008), Forest Recovery and Just Sustainability in the Florianopolis City-region, ProQuest, ISBN 978-1-109-06209-0
- Fodor's Travel Publications (2012), Fodor's See It: Brazil, Fodor's Travel Publications, ISBN 978-0-87637-147-3
- Parque Estadual da Serra do Tabuleiro (in Portuguese), FATMA: Fundação do meio Ambiente, archived from the original on 2016-05-10
- "Parque Estadual da Serra do Tabuleiro", Ponta do Papagaio (in Portuguese)
