= D'Una River =

- Location within Brazil
- Native name: Rio D'Una (Portuguese)

Location
- Country: Brazil

Physical characteristics
- Mouth
  - coordinates: 28.222002°S 48.739805°W

The D'Una River (Portuguese: Rio D'Una) is a river of the state of Santa Catarina, Brasil.

== Course ==
The D'Una rises in the 84,130 hectares (207,900 acres) Serra do Tabuleiro State Park. The lush forests of the park protect the sources of the Vargem do Braço, Cubatão and D'Una rivers, which supply most of the drinking water for greater Florianópolis and the south coast region. The river runs south into the Lagoa do Imaruí, which empties into the Atlantic Ocean beside Laguna, Santa Catarina.

== See also ==
- List of rivers of Santa Catarina
- List of rivers of Brazil

== Sources ==
- Parque Estadual da Serra do Tabuleiro (in Portuguese), FATMA: Fundação do meio Ambiente, archived from the original on 2016-05-10
