= Vargem do Braço River =

Vargem do Braço River Vargem do Cedro River Pilões River
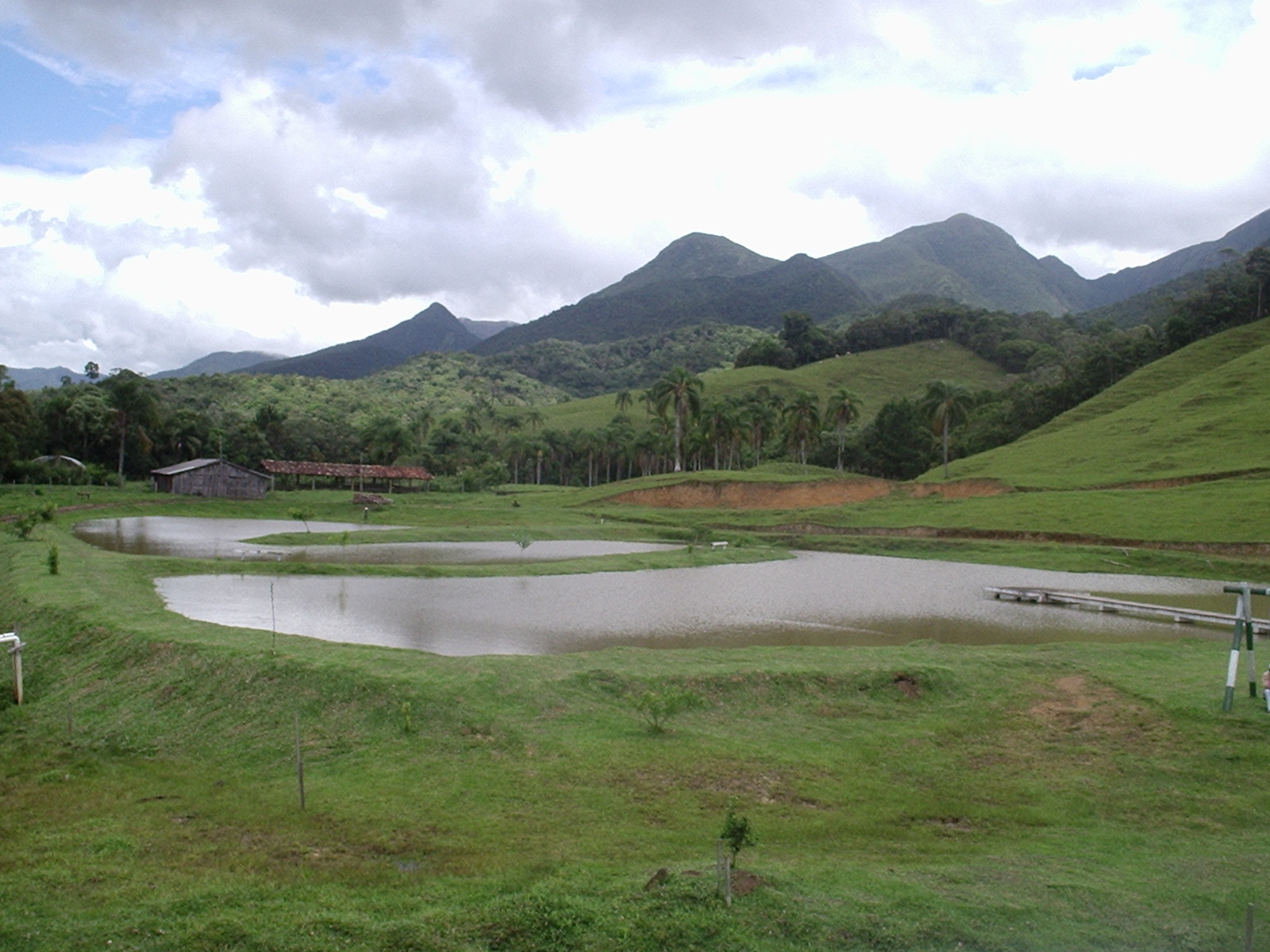
- Scenery in the community of Vargem do Braço near the river mouth.

- Location within Brazil
- Native name: Rio Vargem do Braço (Portuguese)

Location
- Country: Brazil

Physical characteristics
- Mouth
  - location: Cubatão River, Morro da Pipa, Santa Catarina
  - coordinates: 27°42′23″S 48°42′6″W

Basin features
- River system: Cubatão River

The Vargem do Braço River (Portuguese: Rio Vargem do Braço, also known as Rio Vargem do Cedro and Rio Pilões) is a river of the state of Santa Catarina, Brazil.

== Course ==
The Vargem do Braço River rises in the lushly-forested Serra do Tabuleiro State Park, a 84,130 hectares (207,900 acres) protected area created in 1975. The Serra do Tabuleiro, with altitudes above 1,200 metres (3,900 ft), is the largest mountain in the east-central portion of the state. The river is the main source of water for the greater Florianópolis metropolitan region. The river seems to have flowed north-northwest until quite recently, when a major tectonic event forced it to change its course. It now flows east-northeast to enter the Cubatão River near its mouth on the Atlantic Ocean.

== See also ==
- List of rivers of Santa Catarina
- List of rivers of Brazil

== Sources ==
- José Pedro de Paiva Reis; Edison Ramos Tomazzoli (September 2010), "Evidências de neotectônica na bacia do Rio Vargem do Braço, SC", Revista de Geografia (in Portuguese), VIII SINAGEO (1), Recife: UFPE – DCG/NAPA
- Parque Estadual da Serra do Tabuleiro (in Portuguese), FATMA: Fundação do meio Ambiente, archived from the original on 2016-05-10
