= Cubatão River (south Santa Catarina) =

River in Santa Catarina state, Brazil

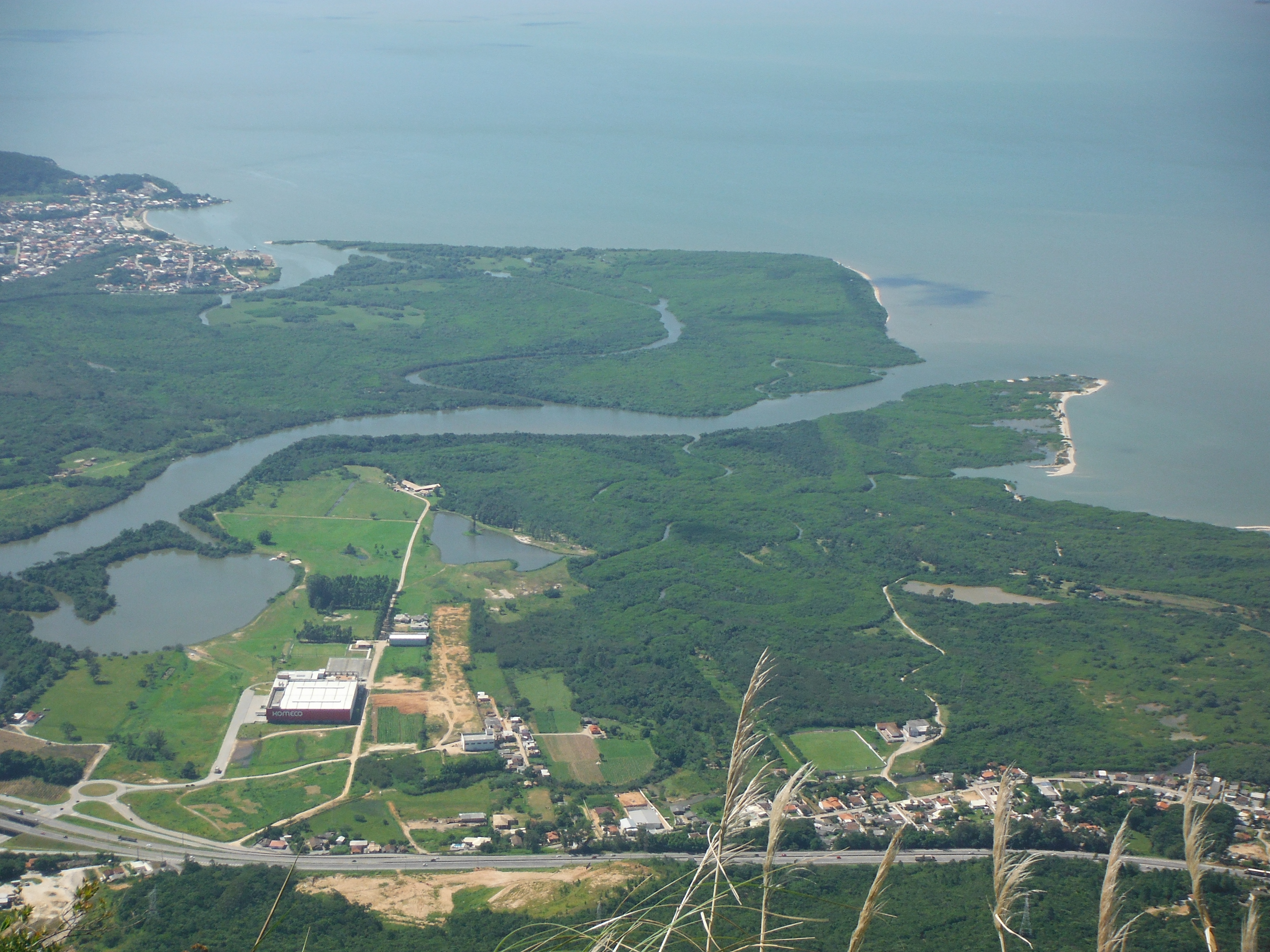

- Location within Brazil
- Native name: Rio Cubatão (Portuguese)

Location
- Country: Brazil

Physical characteristics
- Source
  - location: Santa Catarina state
- Mouth
  - location: Atlantic Ocean, Palhoça, Santa Catarina
  - coordinates: 27.698296°S 48.636924°W

Basin features
- Tributaries
  - right: Vargem do Braço River

The Cubatão River is a river of Santa Catarina state in southeastern Brazil.

The sources of the river are in the 84,130 hectares (207,900 acres) Serra do Tabuleiro State Park, a mountainous region to the south west of Florianópolis covered in lush rain forest. The river supplies water to the greater Florianópolis region. It enters the Atlantic to the south of the suburb of Palhoça.

== See also ==
- List of rivers of Santa Catarina
