= Campo Belo do Sul =

- Municipality
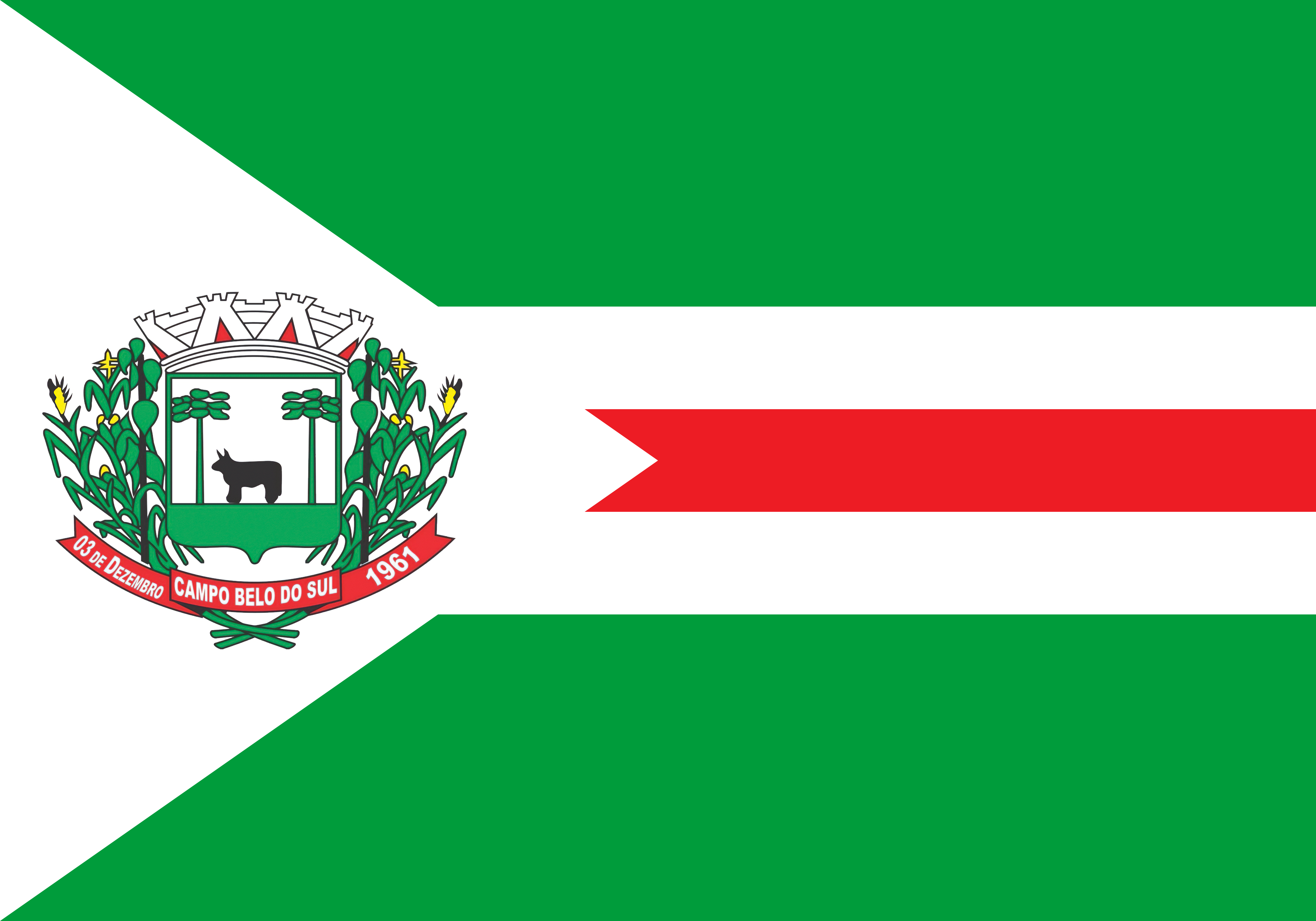
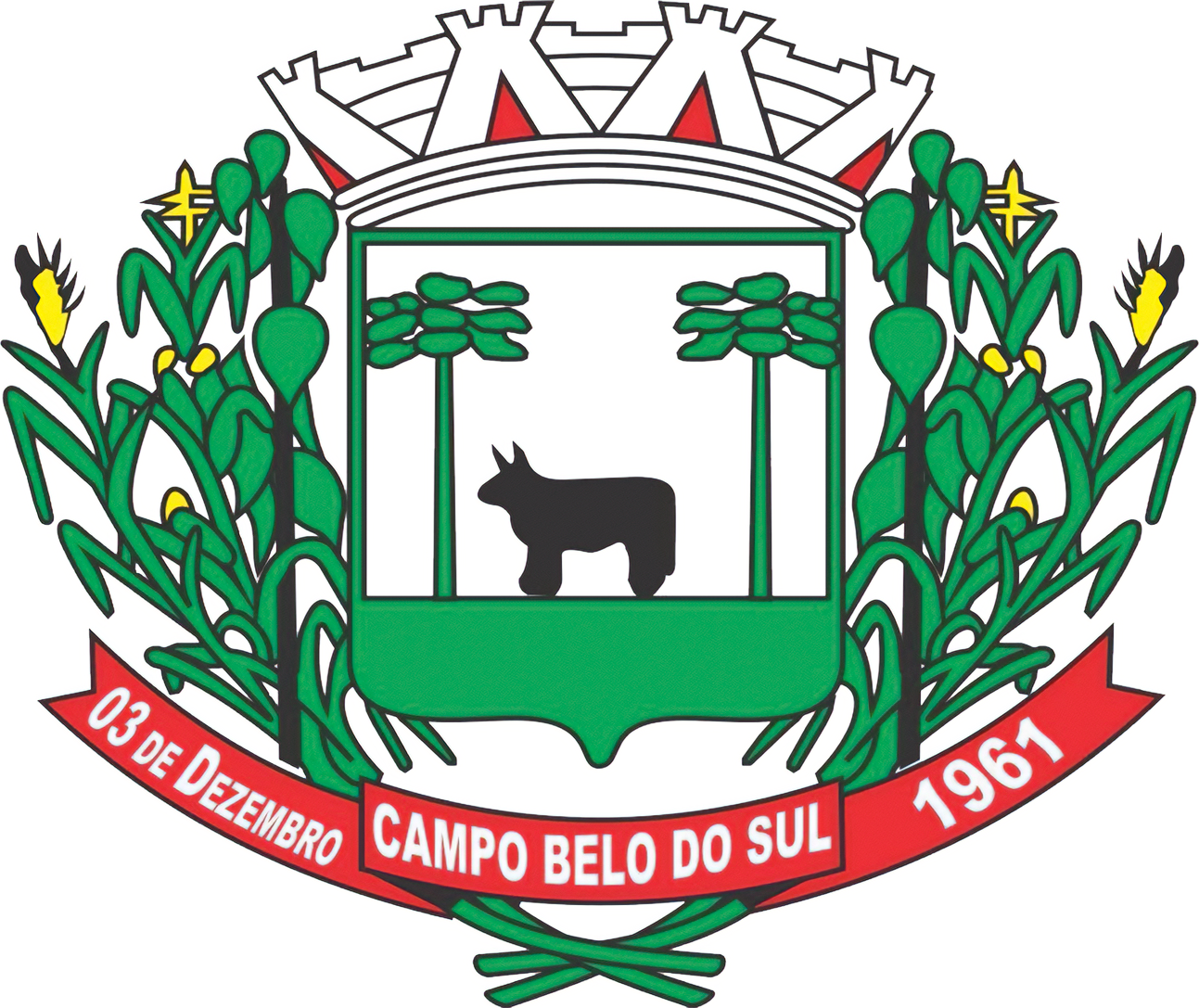
- Flag Coat of arms

- Location in Brazil
- Coordinates: 27°54′S 50°45′W
- Country: Brazil
- Region: South
- State: Santa Catarina
- Mesoregion: Serrana

Population (2020)
  - Total: 6,952
- Time zone: UTC -3
- Website: campobelodosul.sc.gov.br

Campo Belo do Sul is a municipality in the state of Santa Catarina in the South region of Brazil.

== Climate ==
According to the Köppen climate classification, Campo Belo do Sul is classified as Oceanic climate (Köppen: Cfb).

== See also ==
- List of municipalities in Santa Catarina
