= Campos Novos =

City in Santa Catarina, Brazil

- Municipality
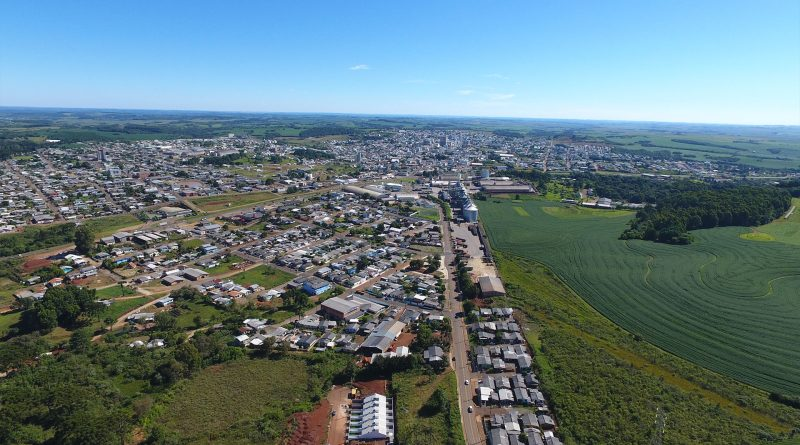
- Partial view of Campos Novos

- Flag Coat of arms
- Nickname: Santa Catarina's Granary
- Anthem: Anthem of the municipality of Campos Novos
- Location of Campos Novos

- Location within Brazil
- Coordinates: 27°24′07″S 51°13′30″W
- Country: Brazil
- Region: South
- State: (Santa Catarina (state)) Santa Catarina
- Districts: Campos Novos (seat), Bela Vista, Dal Pai, Encruzilhada, Espinilho, Ibicuí, Leão, and Guarani
- Metropolitan region: Contestado
- Neighboring municipalities: North: Erval Velho, Ibiam, and Monte Carlo; South: Barracão, Celso Ramos, and Anita Garibaldi; East: Vargem, Brunópolis, and Abdon Batista; West: Capinzal, Zortéa, Herval d'Oeste.
- Distance to capital: 370 km
- Founded: March 30, 1881

Government
  - Mayor: Dirceu José Kaiper (MDB)
  - Term ends: 2028

Area
  - Total: 1,717.697 km^{2} (663.207 sq mi)
- Elevation: 946.7 m (3,106 ft)

Population (2022)
  - Total: 36,932
  - Rank: BR: 895th SC: 41st
  - Density: 21.501/km^{2} (55.687/sq mi)
- Demonym: Campos-novense
- Time zone: UTC-3 (UTC-3)
  - Summer (DST): UTC-2 (UTC-2)
- Postal code (CEP): 89620-000
- Climate: Humid subtropical
- HDI (UNDP/2010): 0.742
- GDP: R$2,610,110,761
- GDP per capita: R$70,809.55
- Website: www.camposnovos.sc.gov.br

Campos Novos is a Brazilian municipality located in the western part of the state of Santa Catarina, in the Southern Region of Brazil. It belongs to the Chapecó Intermediate Geographic Region and the Joaçaba-Herval d'Oeste Immediate Geographic Region, situated approximately 370 km west of the state capital. The municipality covers an area of about 1,717 km^{2} (663 sq mi), with an estimated population of 36,932 inhabitants in 2022, making it the 41st most populous municipality in the state.

The region was first explored in the 18th century, initially inhabited solely by the Kaingang indigenous people. Established in 1881, Campos Novos experienced significant population growth in the early 20th century due to the arrival of immigrants seeking employment and refugees from the Contestado War. The municipality's agricultural potential was revealed during this period, propelling it to the forefront of crop production in Santa Catarina, with major crops including maize, soybean, bean, wheat, and barley, while also excelling in livestock and beekeeping.

Campos Novos boasts several cultural and historical attractions, including the São João Batista Parish Church, the Coronel Gasparino Zorzi Cultural Center, and the Pilgrimage of Our Lady of Aparecida, which attracts an average of 70,000 devotees. The Campos Novos Hydroelectric Plant, constructed in 2006, generates a quarter of Santa Catarina's energy supply.

== Etymology ==
The vast expanse of land and its extensive properties naturally attracted immigrants from São Paulo, Paraná, and even neighboring landowners from Lages, who sought land for cattle ranching. Subsequently, the immense fields gave rise to the municipality's name.

== History ==
=== Origins ===
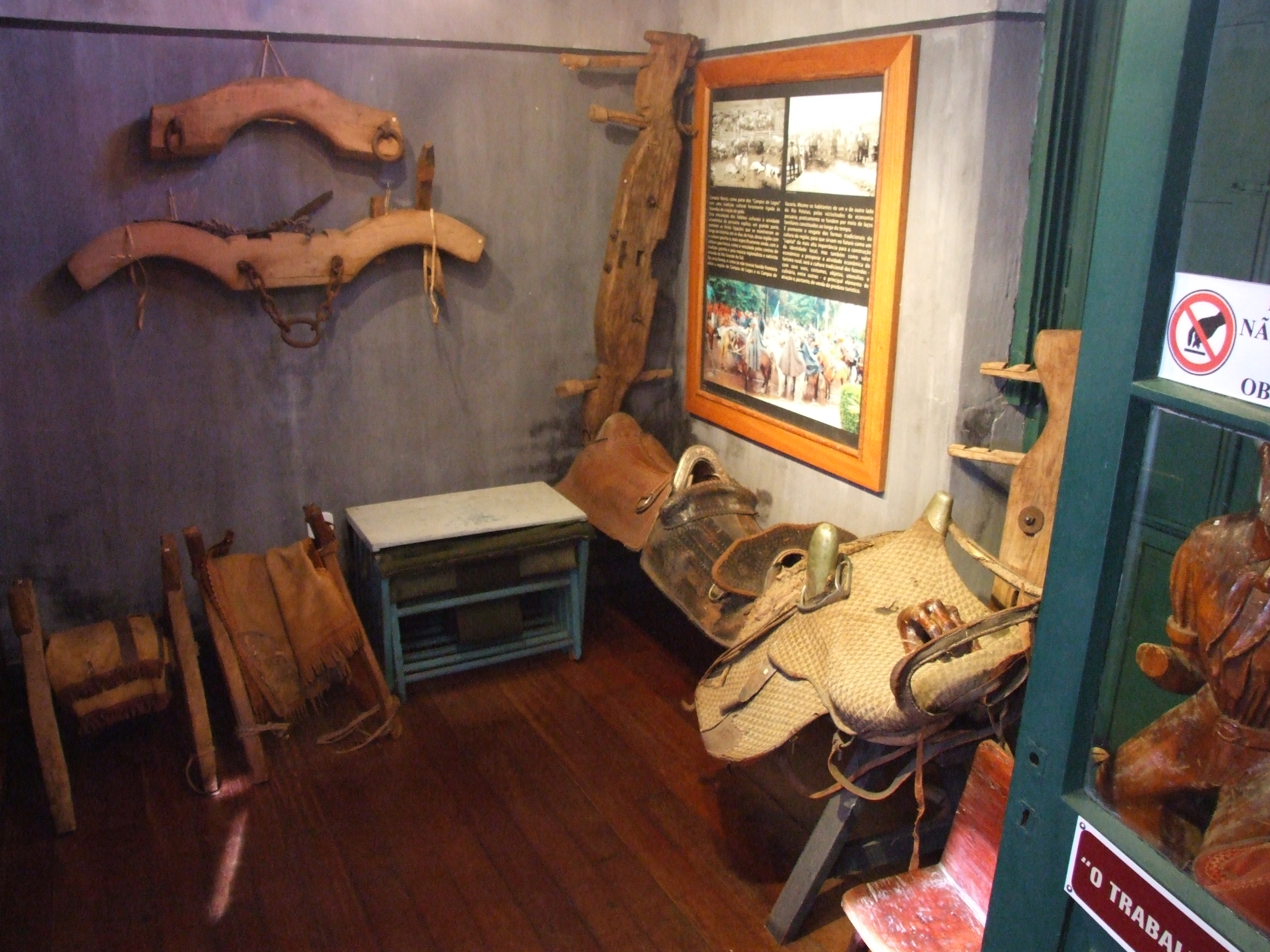
Equipment for riding and draft animals used by settlers, displayed at the Sebastião Paz de Almeida Historical and Archaeological Museum

Like other municipalities in the broader Western Santa Catarina region, the history of Campos Novos has its roots in the earliest settlement experiences of the Southern Region of Brazil. Before the emergence of settlements in 1650 at São Francisco, Desterro, and Laguna—efforts led by settlers from São Paulo who ventured by sea in search of new opportunities—Western Santa Catarina was already experiencing the proximity of Spaniards, who, alongside Jesuits, explored the region stretching from the Iguazu River to the Uruguay River. Later, in 1663, the bandeirante Antônio Raposo Tavares traversed these lands and, allied with the Coroado indigenous groups, began aggressively pursuing indigenous settlements, a consequence of the catechetical endeavors of those priests. Until 1770, however, when they ceased traveling south due to the allure of gold in the Goiás and Mato Grosso captaincies, the settlers from São Paulo had little to exchange for these lands, at least in terms of regional colonization efforts.

The historical narrative of this municipality begins to take shape with the expedition led by Major Atanagildo Martins, guided by Jongong in 1814, aimed at establishing contact with the Missions. Deviating from the planned route due to the fear instilled in his guide by the Guarani indigenous groups, this expedition reached the Vacaria fields, after traversing the fields where Campos Novos now stands. It is likely, however, that certain landowners from Lages were already permanently established there by 1839.

João Gonçalves de Araújo, a rural landowner in Curitibanos, discovered Campos Novos. Enchanted by the smoke from the fires set by the indigenous people, he organized an expedition and headed toward the Espinilho Ridge. Thus, the first settlers established themselves on the land, soon aided in the occupation efforts by Gaucho fugitives from the Farroupilha Revolution. Among them, Chico Ferro, Chivida, and Miguel dos Anjos were associated with the initial endeavors that gave rise to this municipality. In 1848, settlers from São Paulo reappeared, conquering the São Jorge fields. Together with newcomers from Curitiba, Palmas, Lages, Guarapuava, and the Gaucho fields of the Rio Grande do Sul Province, they formed a crucial foundation for the community's organization.

The colonization did not begin precisely where the prosperous city of Campos Novos now stands. Initially, it took place about one kilometer from the city, near a stream. Salvador Vieira, moving away from the nascent settlement, built the first house within the perimeter of this thriving city. Shortly afterward, with the settlement already demarcated, Domingos Matos Cordeiro began constructing the São João Batista Parish Church.

=== Administrative formation ===
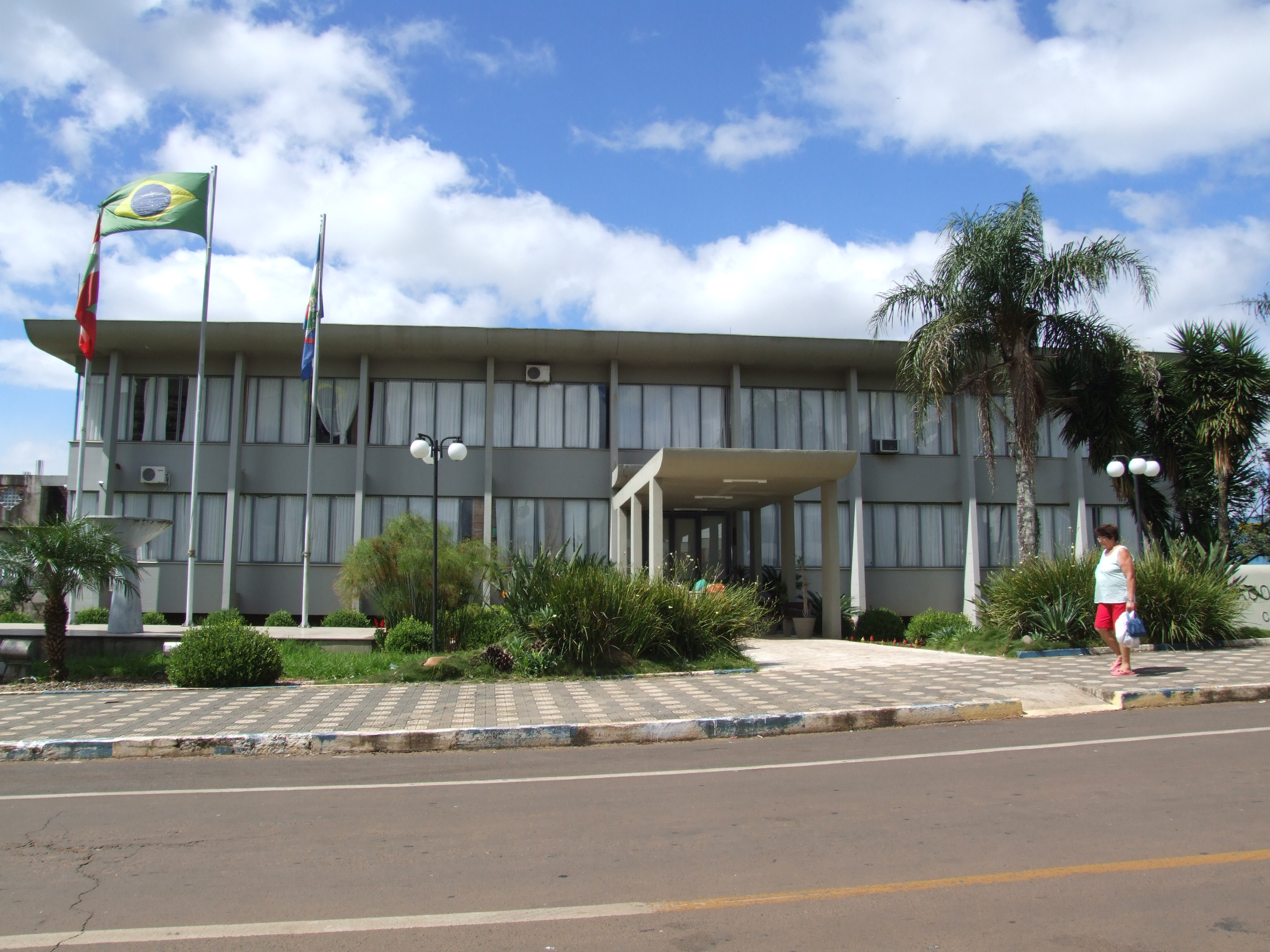
Current city hall building, which was inaugurated in 1975

By Provincial Law No. 377, dated June 16, 1854, the district of Campos Novos, which had existed for some years, was emancipated from the Village of Nossa Senhora dos Prazeres to form a separate parish. Its first authorities were João Fernandes da Caripuna, a native of Pernambuco, and Domiciano de Azevedo. In 1869, under Law No. 625 of June 11, Campos Novos, along with Palmas and Curitibanos, formed a district of the newly established Curitibanos municipality. Subsequently, by Law No. 923 of March 30, 1881, the Campos Novos district was elevated to the status of a municipality named São João dos Campos Novos; concurrently, the São João Batista parish of Campos Novos was recognized as a village. Its first Intendant was Colonel Manoel Ferreira da Silva Farrapo.

Until 1933, the municipality of Campos Novos shared borders with Lages, Curitibanos, Cruzeiro do Sul (now Joaçaba), Porto União, and the state of Rio Grande do Sul, covering an area of approximately 15,000 km² at the time. On March 25, 1934, by Decree No. 408, the districts of Rio das Antas and Caçador were detached; in 1943, its territory was further reduced with the emancipation of the districts of Herval, Rio Uruguai, Rio Bonito, and Perdizes. Conversely, the districts of Ypira and Ouro were annexed to its territory, only to be detached again in 1949, along with Piratuba, Ypira, and parts of Tupitinga, Capinzal, and Ouro. In 1997, Campos Novos lost a portion of its territory to the establishment of the municipality of Zortéa. Today, there are seven remaining districts besides the seat: Bela Vista, Dal Pai, Espinilho, Encruzilhada, Guarani, Ibicuí, and Leão.

=== After emancipation ===
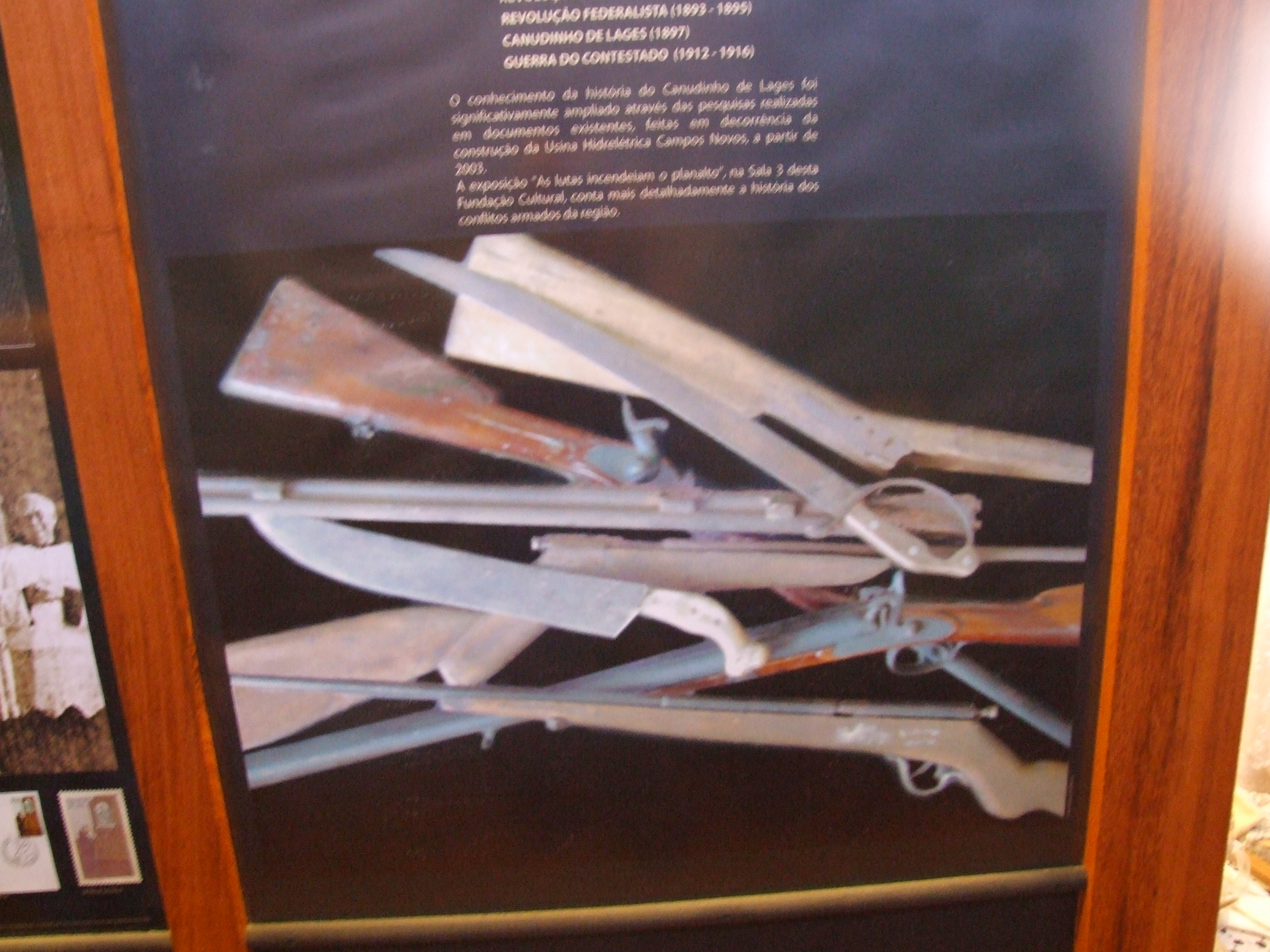
Firearms used in the Contestado War, displayed at the Sebastião Paz de Almeida Historical and Archaeological Museum

In 1893, with an invasion led by Colonel Demétrio Ramos, the municipality's territory felt the repercussions of a civil war. The village was attacked in the early hours of May 19 of that year. Caught off guard, the square's defenders, including local residents, sought refuge with their families in the residence of Colonel Henrique Rupp, which, due to its high-quality construction, provided adequate protection against the invaders. With the defense organized, Lieutenant-Colonel Atanázio de Matos, accompanied by six soldiers, was tasked with retaking the Intendancy, courageously expelling the revolutionaries. A new battle ensued to drive the attackers from their entrenched position, resulting in another victory for the defenders, causing a disorganized retreat of the assault forces. The resistance of Campos Novos led to the death of five brave defenders who fell in the line of duty.

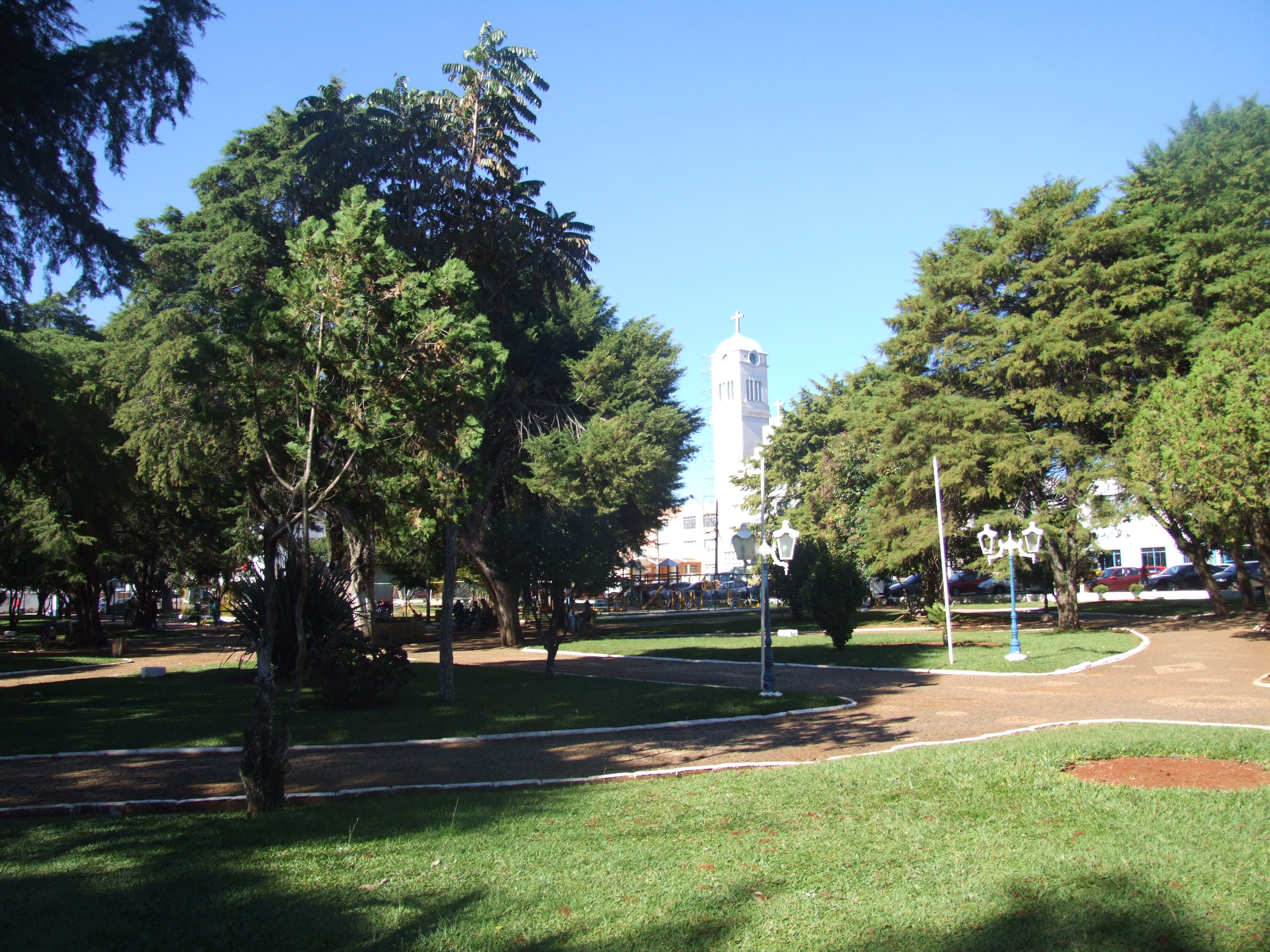
Lauro Müller Square, in 2011

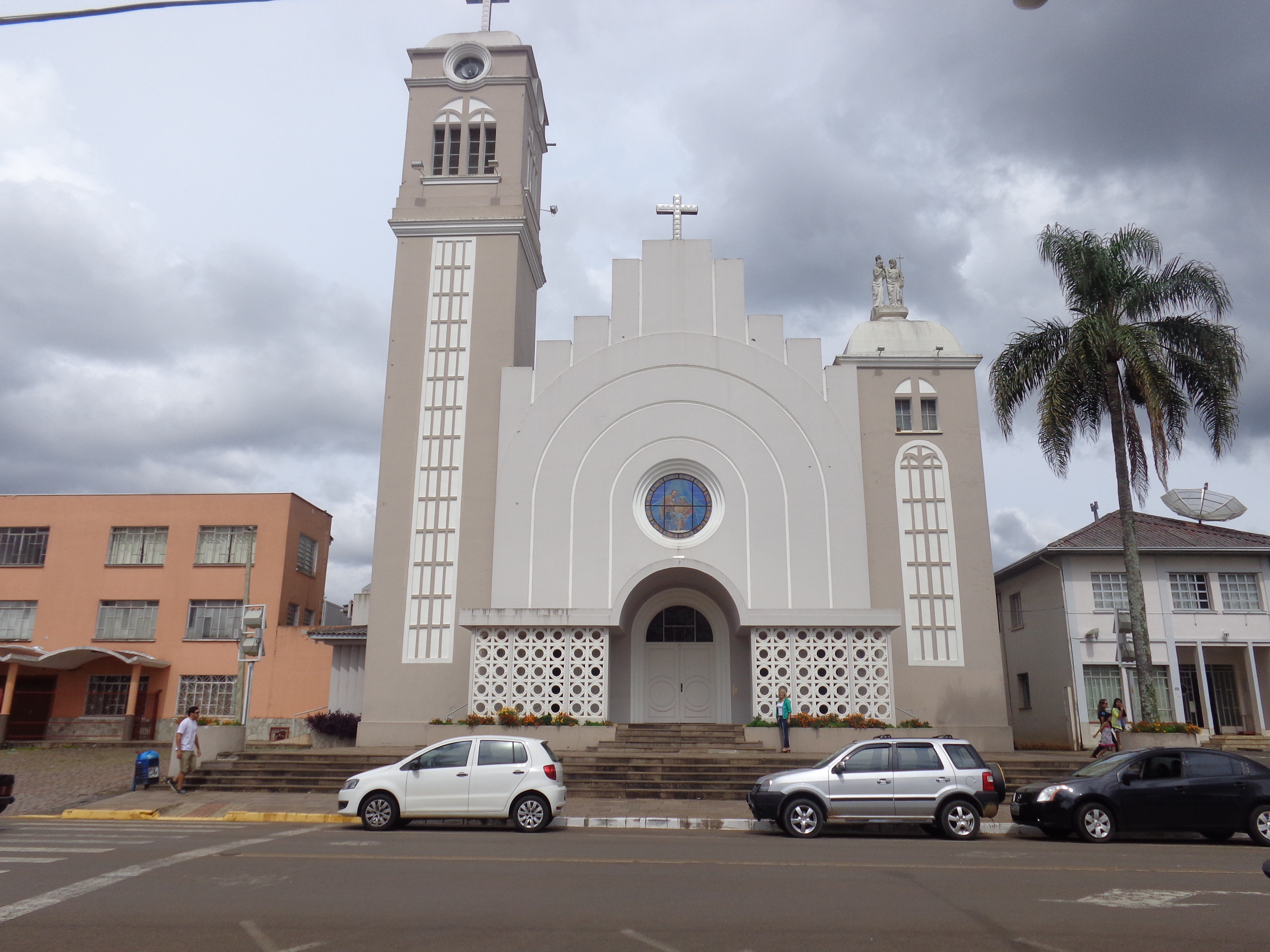
São João Batista Parish Church, in 2016

At the beginning of the 20th century, the city underwent a period of development with the arrival of immigrants drawn by the prospect of better living conditions in Brazil. Primarily Germans and Italians, they initially contributed to agriculture and the construction of the São Paulo-Rio Grande Railway, and later, after the 1920s, to the establishment of small industries. Poles, Russians, and Lebanese also arrived, along with a significant number of descendants of Germans and Italians, mainly from Rio Grande do Sul, and Caboclos who settled after the end of the Contestado War.

Due to the city's demographic growth, infrastructure investments became necessary. The early 20th century saw the arrival of the railway and small industries. In 1922, the first medical clinic was established at Dr. José Athanásio's house, where the Dr. José Athanásio Hospital now operates. On March 29, 1954, the Auxiliadora School was founded, and in 1957, Rádio Cultura de Campos Novos was established. Agriculture was strengthened with the creation of Copercampos on November 8, 1970, which initiated cooperativism. Today, the city is a major grain producer, particularly of maize, soybean, bean, wheat, and barley, and is notable for its livestock, especially dairy production.

== Geography ==
According to the Brazilian Institute of Geography and Statistics, the municipality's area is 1,659.625 km^{2} (640.785 sq mi), with 4.5211 km^{2} (1.7456 sq mi) constituting the urban area and the remaining 1,655.1 km^{2} (639.0 sq mi) forming the rural area, making it the third largest in Santa Catarina, surpassed only by Lages and São Joaquim. It is located at 27°24′07″ latitude south and 51°13′30″ longitude west, approximately 370 kilometers west of the capital of Santa Catarina. It borders Erval Velho, Ibiam, and Monte Carlo to the north; Barracão (Rio Grande do Sul), Celso Ramos, and Anita Garibaldi to the south; Vargem, Brunópolis, and Abdon Batista to the east; and Capinzal, Zortéa, Ouro, Lacerdópolis, and Herval d'Oeste to the west.

=== Geomorphology and hydrography ===
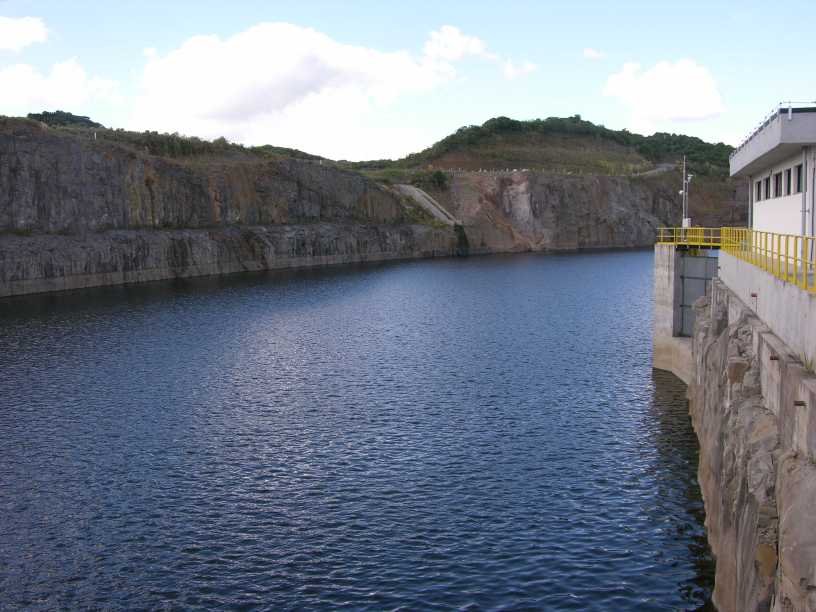
Reservoir at the Campos Novos Hydroelectric Plant

The city's terrain is predominantly gently undulating, deep, and well-drained, offering favorable physical conditions for root development. It is minimally susceptible to erosion and supports the use of agricultural machinery and implements. In some areas of the municipal territory, there are stronger undulations, which are more prone to erosion and pose greater challenges to agricultural mechanization, particularly where the soil type is Cambisol, containing stones. Although much of the municipality's area has terrain suitable for agriculture, Campos Novos' soils are acidic, often contaminated with exchangeable aluminum, and have limited nutrient reserves. However, when properly managed, they become suitable for both annual crops and less intensive uses such as fruit cultivation, pasture, and reforestation.

The city is part of the Lages Plateau hydrographic region and the Canoas River hydrographic basin, one of the main basins in Santa Catarina. The Canoas River flows through Campos Novos and eleven other municipalities, and upon merging with the Pelotas River, it forms the Uruguay River. The Campos Novos Hydroelectric Plant, operational since 2007, generates a quarter of Santa Catarina's energy consumption.

=== Climate ===
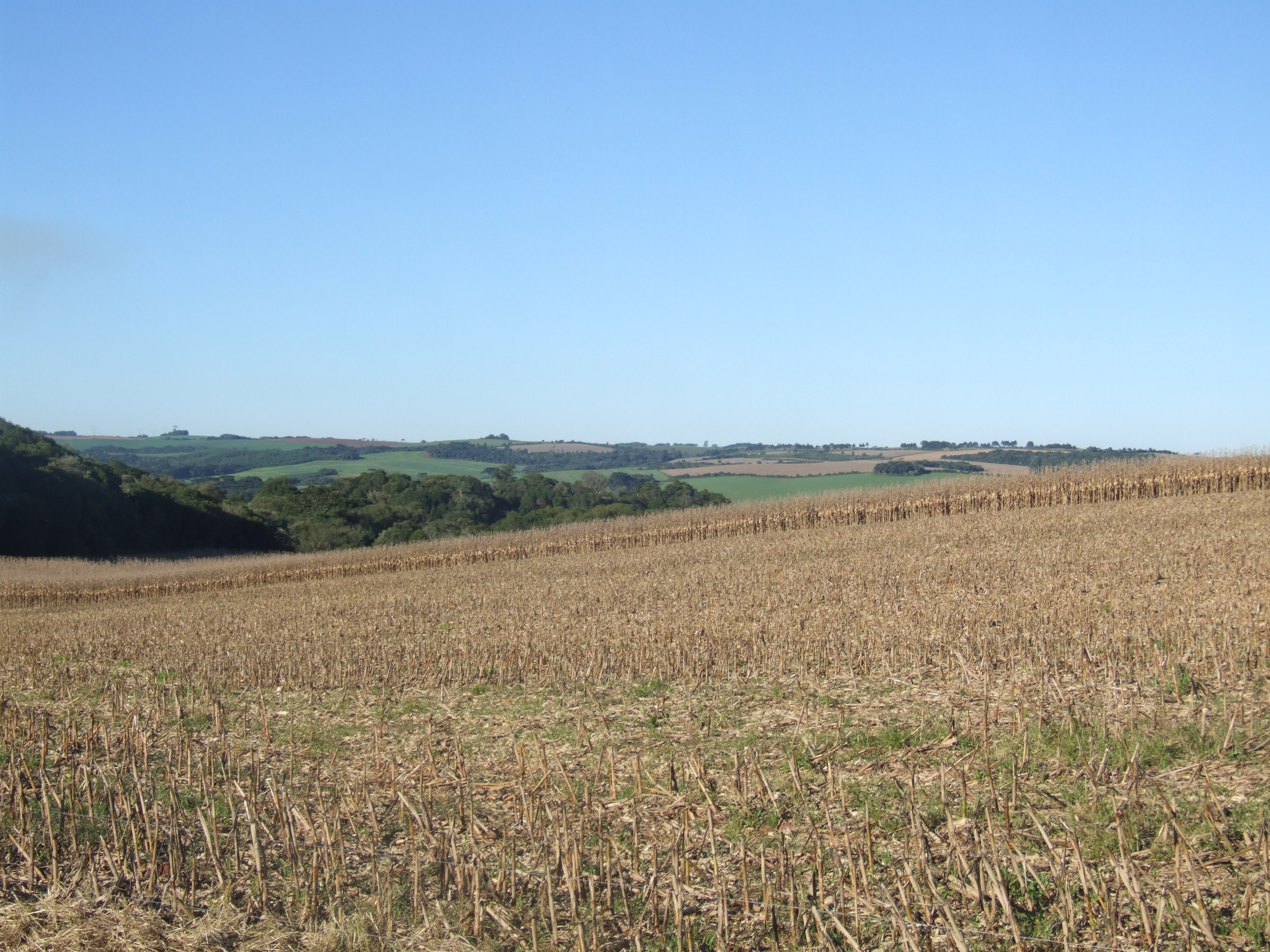
Crops in Campos Novos on a sunny day

According to the IBGE, Campos Novos' climate is classified as humid subtropical (type Cfa according to the Köppen system), characterized by high relative humidity (RH) and an average annual temperature of around 17 °C (63 °F), with mild summers and cold winters. With over 2,200 h (7,900 ks) of annual insolation, the area receives approximately 2,100 mm (83 in) of rainfall per year, evenly distributed throughout the year, without a distinct dry season.

In recent years, however, hot and dry days during Indian summers have become increasingly frequent, often exceeding 28 °C (82 °F), particularly in summer. During these dry periods, wildfires in rural areas are common, contributing to deforestation and the release of pollutants into the atmosphere, further degrading air quality. These fires are often intentional, used to prepare land for cultivation, but they are recurrently prohibited. Frosts are not uncommon, occurring on average 12 to 22 times per year. While snow is less frequent, official records note occurrences on July 12, 2000 and, with significant intensity, on July 22, 2013.

Climate data for Campos Novos (1991–2020 normals, extremes 1976–2005)
Month	Jan	Feb	Mar	Apr	May	Jun	Jul	Aug	Sep	Oct	Nov	Dec	Year
Record high °C (°F)	36.2 (97.2)	34.6 (94.3)	34.0 (93.2)	30.5 (86.9)	29.4 (84.9)	27.4 (81.3)	28.2 (82.8)	31.0 (87.8)	33.2 (91.8)	32.2 (90.0)	33.7 (92.7)	38.0 (100.4)	38.0 (100.4)
Mean daily maximum °C (°F)	26.6 (79.9)	26.4 (79.5)	25.5 (77.9)	23.1 (73.6)	19.2 (66.6)	18.1 (64.6)	18.1 (64.6)	20.4 (68.7)	20.7 (69.3)	22.9 (73.2)	25.0 (77.0)	26.5 (79.7)	22.7 (72.9)
Daily mean °C (°F)	20.8 (69.4)	20.6 (69.1)	19.4 (66.9)	17.1 (62.8)	13.6 (56.5)	12.5 (54.5)	12.1 (53.8)	13.8 (56.8)	14.6 (58.3)	17.0 (62.6)	18.7 (65.7)	20.4 (68.7)	16.7 (62.1)
Mean daily minimum °C (°F)	16.5 (61.7)	16.6 (61.9)	15.4 (59.7)	13.0 (55.4)	9.8 (49.6)	8.7 (47.7)	8.1 (46.6)	9.2 (48.6)	10.3 (50.5)	12.7 (54.9)	13.9 (57.0)	15.8 (60.4)	12.5 (54.5)
Record low °C (°F)	5.3 (41.5)	4.0 (39.2)	1.9 (35.4)	−1.0 (30.2)	−2.0 (28.4)	−3.8 (25.2)	−6.3 (20.7)	−6.5 (20.3)	−4.2 (24.4)	1.0 (33.8)	1.1 (34.0)	0.0 (32.0)	−6.5 (20.3)
Average precipitation mm (inches)	211.0 (8.31)	177.5 (6.99)	156.9 (6.18)	164.1 (6.46)	166.5 (6.56)	167.9 (6.61)	172.4 (6.79)	141.1 (5.56)	208.9 (8.22)	250.9 (9.88)	148.5 (5.85)	180.5 (7.11)	2,146.2 (84.50)
Average precipitation days (≥ 1.0 mm)	13	13	11	9	8	9	9	8	11	12	10	11	124
Average relative humidity (%)	76.0	78.3	77.9	77.7	80.5	80.9	77.4	72.6	75.6	76.3	70.7	72.0	76.3
Average dew point °C (°F)	16.9 (62.4)	17.2 (63.0)	16.1 (61.0)	13.9 (57.0)	10.9 (51.6)	9.8 (49.6)	8.8 (47.8)	9.5 (49.1)	10.8 (51.4)	13.2 (55.8)	13.7 (56.7)	15.6 (60.1)	13.0 (55.4)
Mean monthly sunshine hours	215.3	185.9	204.8	188.2	167.1	152.5	177.0	192.0	168.2	175.2	213.0	218.5	2,257.7
Source 1: NOAA
Source 2: Instituto Nacional de Meteorologia (precipitation days 1981–2010)Empresa Brasileira de Pesquisa Agropecuária (EMBRAPA)

=== Ecology and environment ===
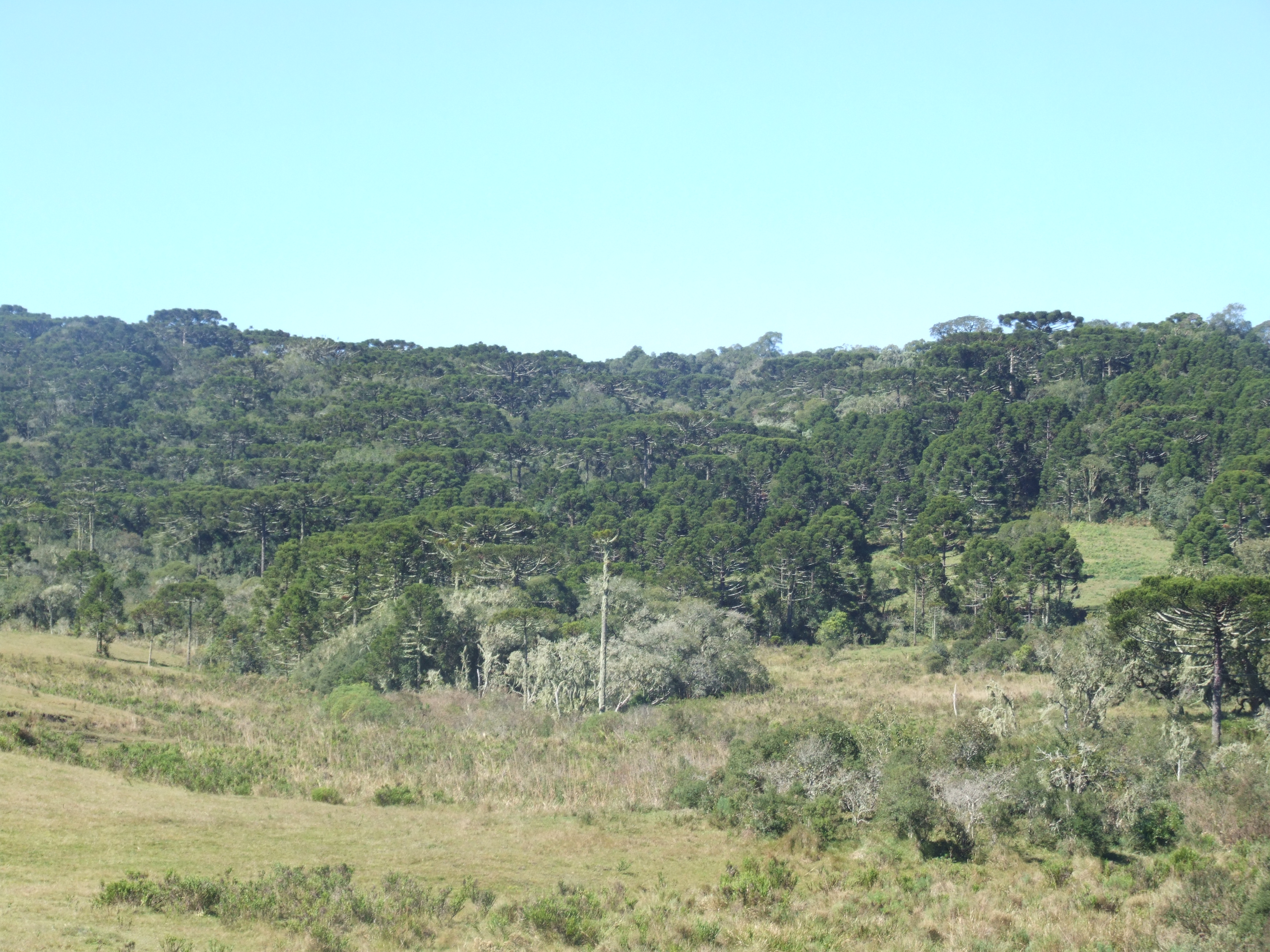
Brazilian pines in Campos Novos

The original and predominant vegetation in the municipality is the pine forest or Araucaria forest, although parts of the native forest have been replaced by agriculture, cattle pastures, or cleared and later reforested. Until the 1980s, the timber industry was a primary source of income for Campos Novos. The construction of the Campos Novos Hydroelectric Plant required the flooding of several native forest areas and surrounding farms along the Canoas River.

To combat deforestation and the destruction of green areas, the municipal government has implemented programs such as Permanent Preservation Areas, which are vegetated strips between the hydroelectric plant's reservoir and surrounding properties, ranging from 30 to 100 meters wide. Deforested areas used for the plant's construction are being restored and converted into riparian forest. Additionally, the Rio Canoas State Park, established on May 27, 2004, spans 1,200 ha (3,000 acres) and is dedicated to preserving the native forest near the hydroelectric plant.

Some remnants of the Araucaria moist forests remain today, along with fields formed by layers of grasses, interspersed with shrubby or arboreal species, and scattered in gallery forests or copses. The municipal area has recorded 44 species of orchids and bromeliads. Regarding fauna, over 80 bird species have been recorded in the municipal area, Regarding herpetofauna, recorded species include the Amazon lava lizard (Tropidurus torquatus), striped worm lizard (Ophiodes striatus), Argentine giant tegu (Tupinambis merianae), worm lizard (Amphisbaena sp.), Wagler's snake (Waglerophis merremii), Neuwied's false fer-de-lance (Xenodon neuwiedii), coral snake (Micrurus altirostris), military ground snake (Liophis miliaris), jararaca (Bothrops jararaca), and Brazilian keelback (Helicops infrataeniatus).

== Demography ==
Historical population
Year	Pop.	±%
1991	42,811	—
2000	28,707	−32.9%
2010	32,829	+14.4%
Source: IBGE

In 2010, the Brazilian Institute of Geography and Statistics (IBGE) counted the municipality's population at 32,829 inhabitants, ranking it as the 40th most populous in the state and the second most populous in the Curitibanos Microregion (behind only Curitibanos), with a population density of 19.9 inhabitants per km². According to the 2010 census, 16,257 inhabitants were men and 16,572 were women. The same census reported that 27,065 inhabitants lived in the urban area and 5,764 in the rural area. Statistics released in 2013 estimated the municipal population at 34,386 inhabitants.

The Municipal Human Development Index (HDI-M) of Campos Novos is considered high by the United Nations Development Programme (UNDP), with a value of 0.742 (the 719th highest in Brazil). The city has most indicators close to the national average according to the UNDP. The education index is 0.658, the longevity index is 0.861, and the income index is 0.721.

=== Poverty and inequality ===
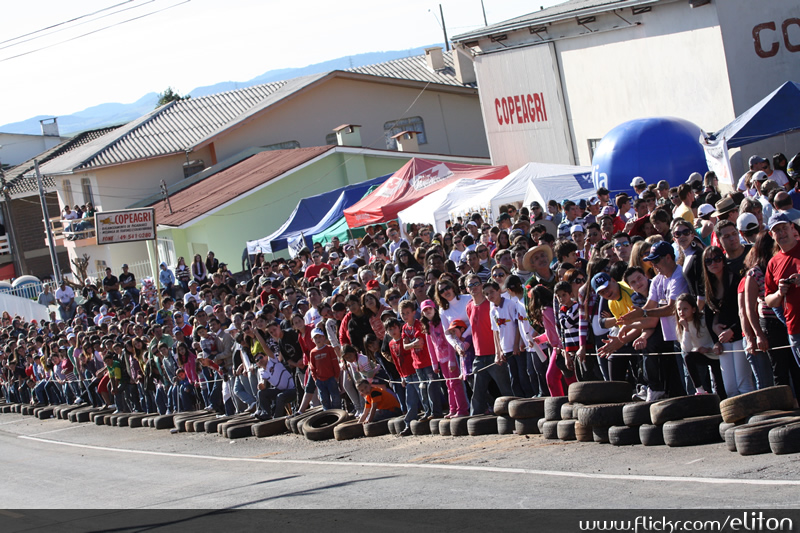
Sample of the population during a street event

According to the IBGE, in 2003, the Gini coefficient, which measures social inequality, was 0.40, with 1.00 being the worst and 0.00 the best. That year, the poverty incidence, as measured by the IBGE, was 34.36%, with a lower limit of 23.29%, an upper limit of 45.44%, and a subjective poverty incidence of 22.35%.

From 1991 to 2010, the proportion of people with a per capita household income of up to half a minimum wage decreased by 68.0%. In 2010, 80.7% of the population lived above the poverty line, 12.1% were at the poverty line, and 7.1% were below it. In 2000, the richest 20% of the city's population accounted for 61.9% of the total municipal income, 28 times higher than the 2.2% share of the poorest 20%. In 1991, the poorest 20% had a 3.2% share, indicating an increase in social inequality from the early 1990s to 2000. Also in 2000, according to the municipal government, there were no records of slums or stilt houses, only instances of illegal lots. Currently, there is specific municipal legislation addressing land regularization, but no dedicated plan or program for land regularization.

=== Religion ===
Reflecting Campos Novos' cultural diversity, the city is home to a variety of religious practices. While it developed on a predominantly Catholic social foundation due to colonization and immigration—and the majority of people in Campos Novos still identify as Catholic—today, dozens of different Protestant denominations, as well as Spiritism and Spiritualism, can be found. In recent decades, Buddhism and Eastern religions have grown in the city. There are also notable Jewish, Mormon, and Afro-Brazilian religious communities. According to the 2000 IBGE census, the population of Campos Novos consists of: Catholics (85.70%), Evangelicals (12.09%), people with no religion (0.98%), Spiritists (0.52%), and others distributed among various religions (0.71%).

==== Roman Catholic Church ====
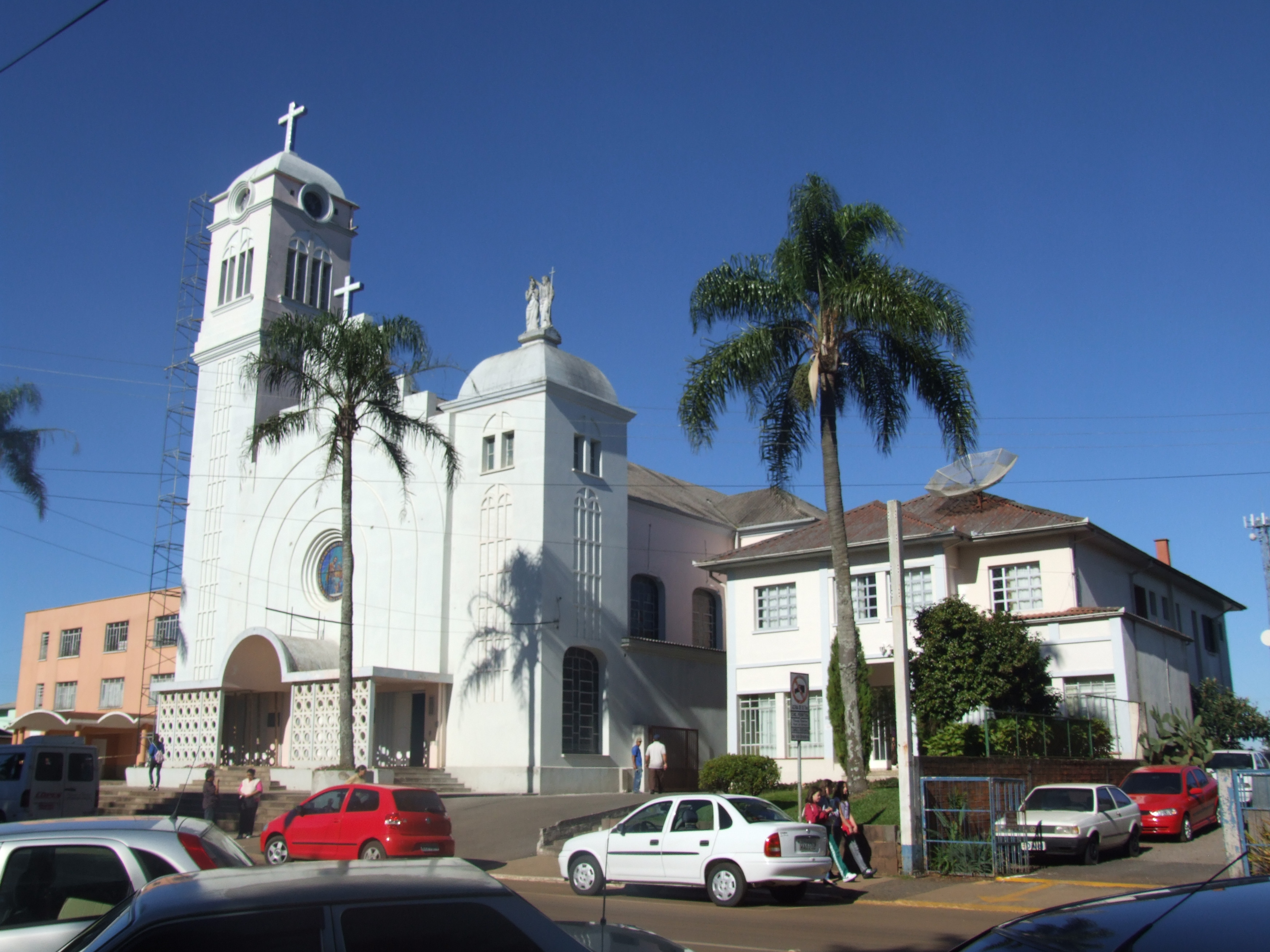
São João Batista Parish Church in Campos Novos

According to the Catholic Church's division, the municipality is part of the Diocese of Joaçaba, established on June 12, 1975, after being separated from the dioceses of Lages, Chapecó, and Caçador. It is subordinate to the Archdiocese of Florianópolis and encompasses thirty other municipalities. The diocese's creation was driven by the rapid population growth in the region in the early 20th century, which fostered the development of Catholicism.

The city's main religious landmarks are the São João Batista Parish Church and the Our Lady of Aparecida Sanctuary. The parish church, located in the city center opposite Lauro Müller Square, is notable for its interior adorned with wooden sculptures, stained glass, and paintings. The sanctuary is renowned for the Pilgrimage of Our Lady of Aparecida, held annually on October 12, the saint's day, attracting an average of 70,000 devotees. Conducted since 1977, the pilgrimage covers three kilometers from the parish church to the sanctuary.

==== Protestant churches ====
Despite the Catholic majority, the city is home to a wide range of Protestant or Reformed denominations, including the Sara Nossa Terra Evangelical Community, Maranatha Christian Church, Lutheran Church, Presbyterian Church, Methodist Church, Anglican Episcopal Church, Baptist churches, Assemblies of God, Seventh-day Adventist Church, World Church of God's Power, Universal Church of the Kingdom of God, Christian Congregation in Brazil, among others. According to the 2000 IBGE data, 12.09% of the population were Protestant, with 8.72% belonging to Pentecostal evangelical churches, 1.68% to mission evangelical churches, and 1.69% to other evangelical religions.

There are also Christians from various other denominations, such as Jehovah's Witnesses (0.03% of inhabitants) and members of The Church of Jesus Christ of Latter-day Saints (0.12%).

=== Ethnicities ===
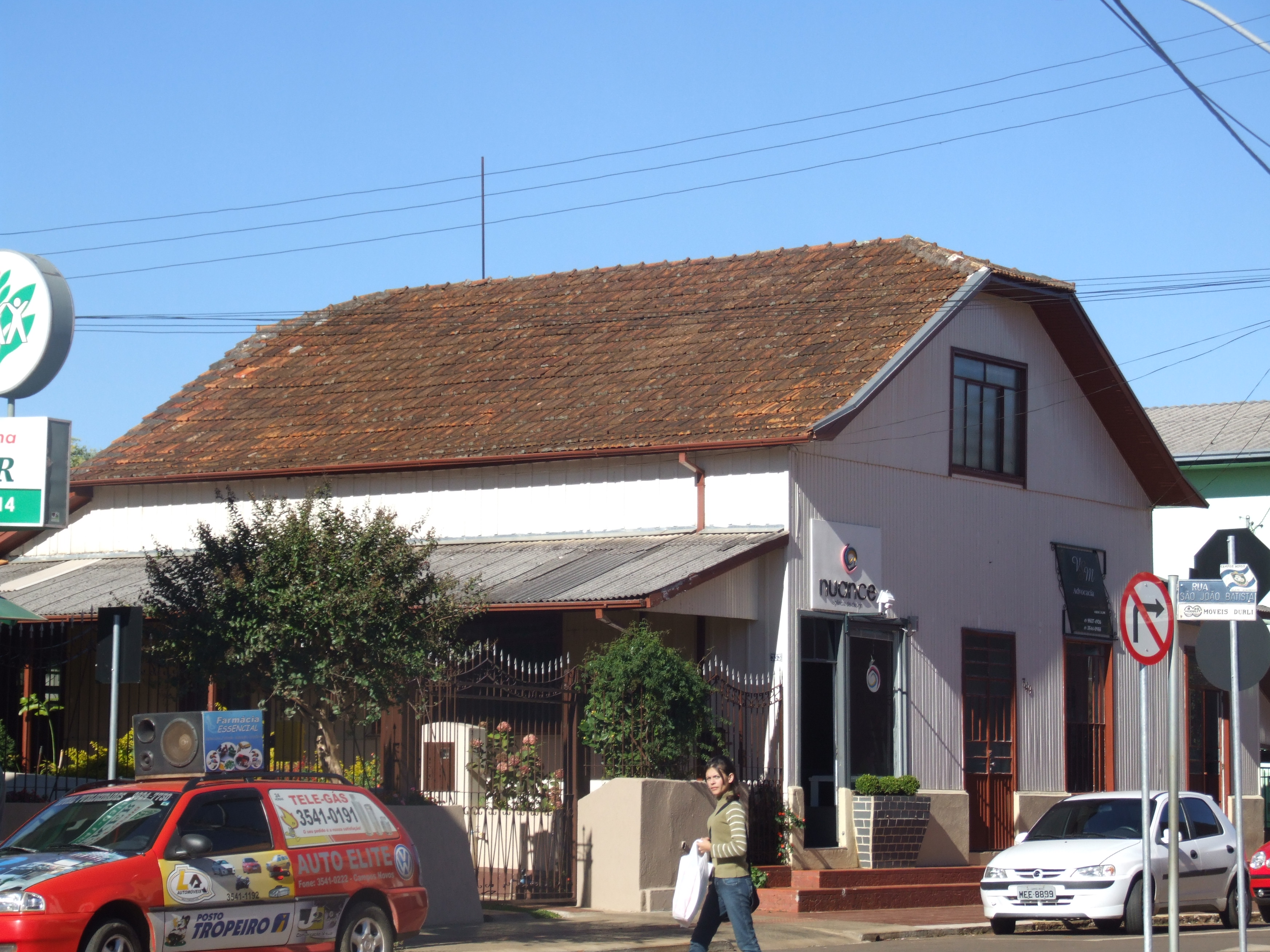
Historic mansion in the city built in the Dutch architectural style

According to IBGE census data from 2010, the population of Campos Novos consisted of 24,178 white people (73.66%), 802 Black people (2.44%), 220 Asian people (0.67%), 7,561 multiracial people (23.03%), and 63 Indigenous people (0.19%). According to IBGE data, there were 25 immigrants from other parts of Santa Catarina and Brazil in 2010. Conversely, 25 people left Campos Novos for other countries, with four going to Italy (16.0%), four to Angola (16.0%), and three to Canada (12.0%).

Immigration was more common in the early 20th century, contributing to agriculture and industrial development after 1930. Many immigrants sought employment, particularly in farming, and bolstered commerce. Campos Novos, like parts of Southern and Southeastern Brazil, received waves of immigrants from various regions, notably Italians, Spaniards, Germans, Dutch, Poles, Russians, and Lebanese. Additionally, people from other Santa Catarina cities, Paraná, São Paulo, and Northeastern Brazil relocated to the region, fleeing the Contestado War.

== Politics and administration ==
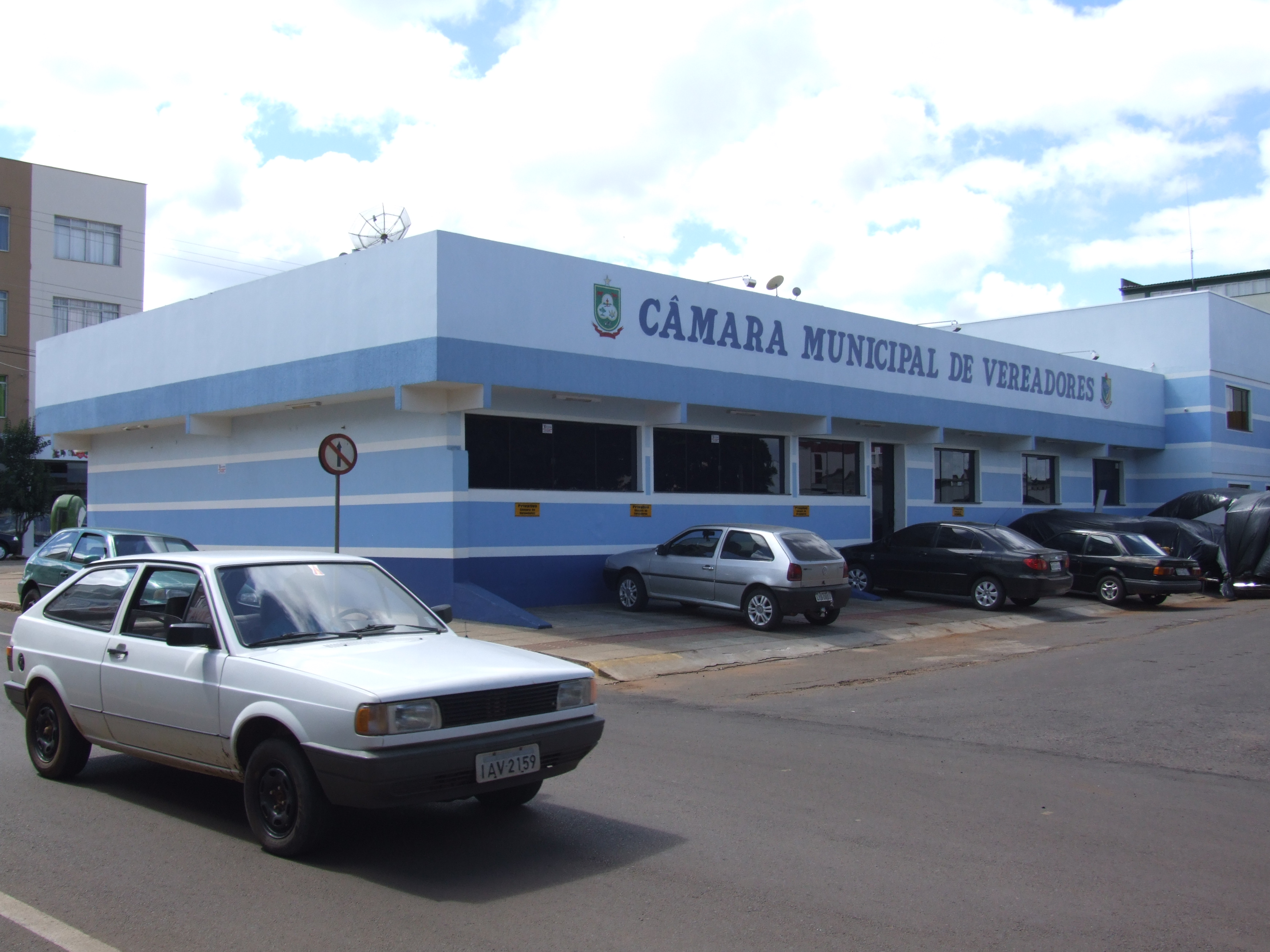
Campos Novos Municipal Chamber, seat of the legislative branch

Municipal administration is carried out by the executive branch and the legislative branch. The first to govern the municipality was Colonel Manoel Ferreira da Silva Farrapo, who took office immediately after the city's emancipation. The current mayor is Silvio Alexandre Zancanaro, from the Social Democratic Party (PSD), who won the 2016 Brazilian municipal elections with 11,826 votes (57.70% of voters).

The legislative branch consists of the municipal chamber, composed of nine councilors elected for four-year terms (as stipulated in Article 29 of the Constitution), with five seats held by the Brazilian Democratic Movement Party (PMDB), three by the Progressive Party (PP), and one by the Workers' Party (PT). The chamber is responsible for drafting and voting on fundamental laws for administration and the executive branch, particularly the participatory budget (Budget Guidelines Law).

The city is governed by an organic law, promulgated and effective from March 30, 1990, and serves as the seat of the Campos Novos Judicial District. In June 2012, the municipality had 25,049 voters, representing 0.529% of Santa Catarina's total.

== Subdivisions ==
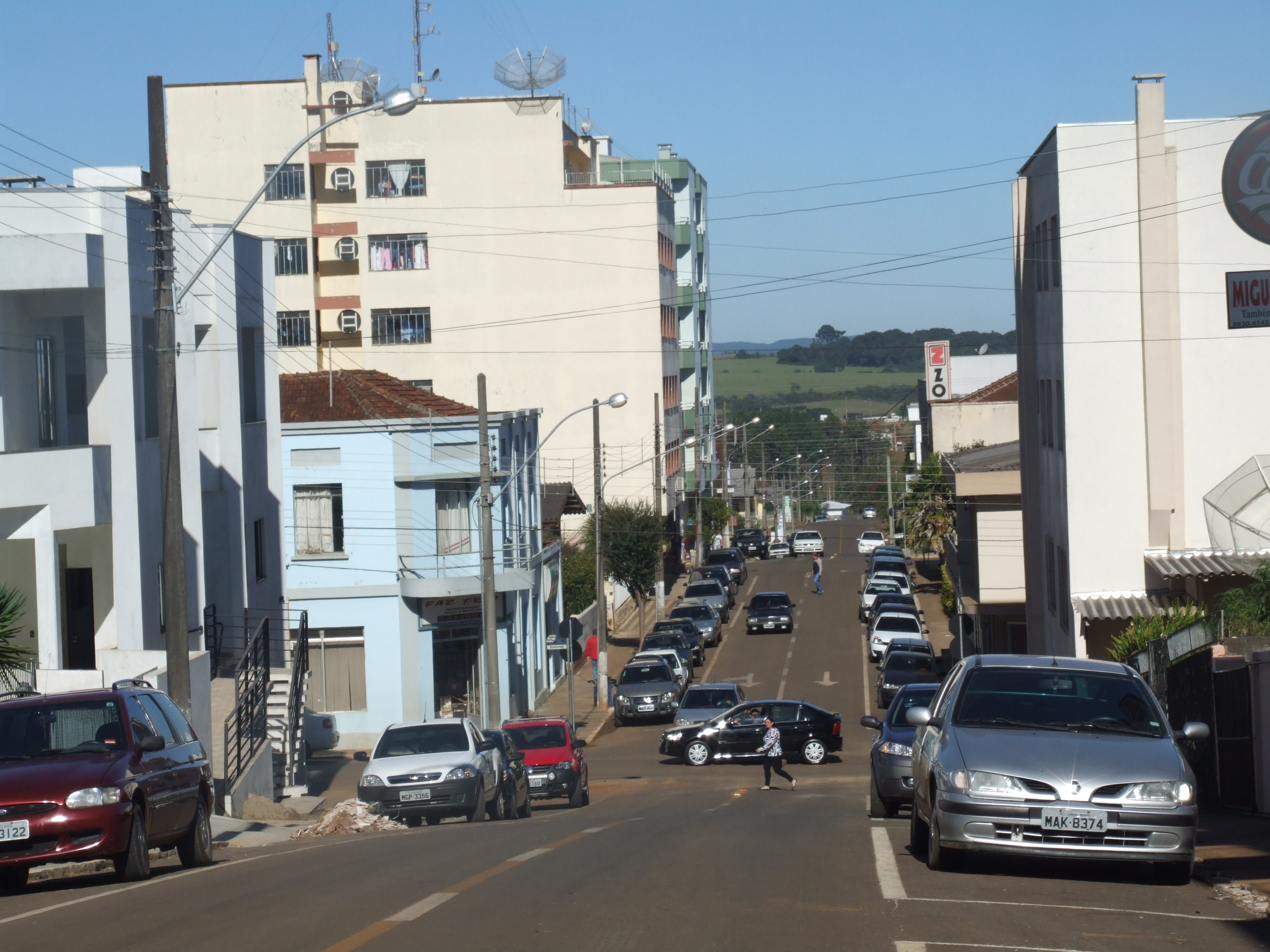
Downtown Campos Novos

Campos Novos is divided into eight districts: the Seat, Bela Vista, Dal Pai, Espinilho, Encruzilhada, Guarani, Ibicuí, and Leão. The Seat was the most populous, with 23,359 inhabitants. The 20th century saw the creation and elevation of several municipal districts to city status, with the last territorial changes occurring on December 29, 1995, with the emancipation of the Zortéa district under state law No. 10051, and on April 3, 2000, with the creation of the Encruzilhada district under Law No. 2590.

According to the municipal government, the city is further divided into nine neighborhoods (Centro, Jardim Bela Vista, Ernesto Zortea, Nossa Senhora Aparecida, Nossa Senhora de Lourdes, São Sebastião, Santo Antônio, Senhor Bom Jesus, and Boa Vista); six social housing complexes (Colina das Flores, Eldorado, Integração, Morada do Sol, Nova Zelândia, and Pedacinho do Céu); and fifteen rural communities, five in the Encruzilhada district (Santo Antônio da Palmeira, Entrada do Pelotas, Colônia Pinhal, Nossa Senhora de Lourdes, and Faé) and ten in Guarani (Santa Bárbara, Pinhal Preto, São José, Caxambu, Linha Durigon, Santa Lúcia, Monte Verde, Assentamento 30 de Outubro, Colônia Hipólito, and Linha Martinelli).

Districts of Campos Novos (IBGE/2010)
District	Inhabitants			Private households
District	Men	Women	Total	Private households
Seat	13,364	13,971	27,335	9,834
Bela Vista	366	310	676	251
Dal Pai	299	233	572	231
Espinilho	142	136	278	117
Encruzilhada	473	411	884	481
Guarani	420	365	785	253
Ibicuí	585	556	1,141	398
Leão	608	545	1,153	426

== Economy ==
The gross domestic product (GDP) of Campos Novos is the largest in the Curitibanos Microregion and the 464th in Brazil. According to 2011 IBGE data, the municipal GDP was R$ 910,300, with 102,147 from net product taxes minus subsidies at current prices, and the GDP per capita was R$ 27,523.96.

In 2010, according to the IBGE, the city had 1,153 local units and 1,106 active businesses and commercial establishments. 7,477 workers were classified as total employed personnel, with 6,452 as salaried employees. Wages and other remunerations totaled 105,427 reais, with an average monthly salary of 2.4 minimum wages across the municipality. Agriculture has always been a primary income source, with commerce and industry gaining prominence since the 1930s. Easy access via highways to major ports on the Santa Catarina coast and various Brazilian and Mercosur cities facilitates agricultural exports.

Primary sector

Corn, soybean, and wheat production (2010)
Product	Harvested area (hectares)	Production (tons)
Corn	18,000	140,400
Soybean	40,000	132,000
Wheat	11,000	30,800

Agriculture is the least significant sector of Campos Novos' economy. Of the city's total GDP, 195,019 thousand reais represents the gross added value of agriculture and livestock. According to IBGE data from 2010, the municipality had approximately 53,457 cattle, 1,721 horses, 180 buffaloes, 145,290 pigs, 1,123 goats, and 9,700 sheep. There were 1,979,033 poultry, of which 1,978,619 were roosters, hens, chickens, and chicks, and 414 thousand were laying hens, producing 7,215 thousand dozen eggs. Additionally, 5,860 cows were milked, yielding 21,085 thousand liters of milk. Four thousand sheep were sheared, producing a total of 9,500 kilograms of wool. The municipality also produced 31 thousand kilograms of honey.

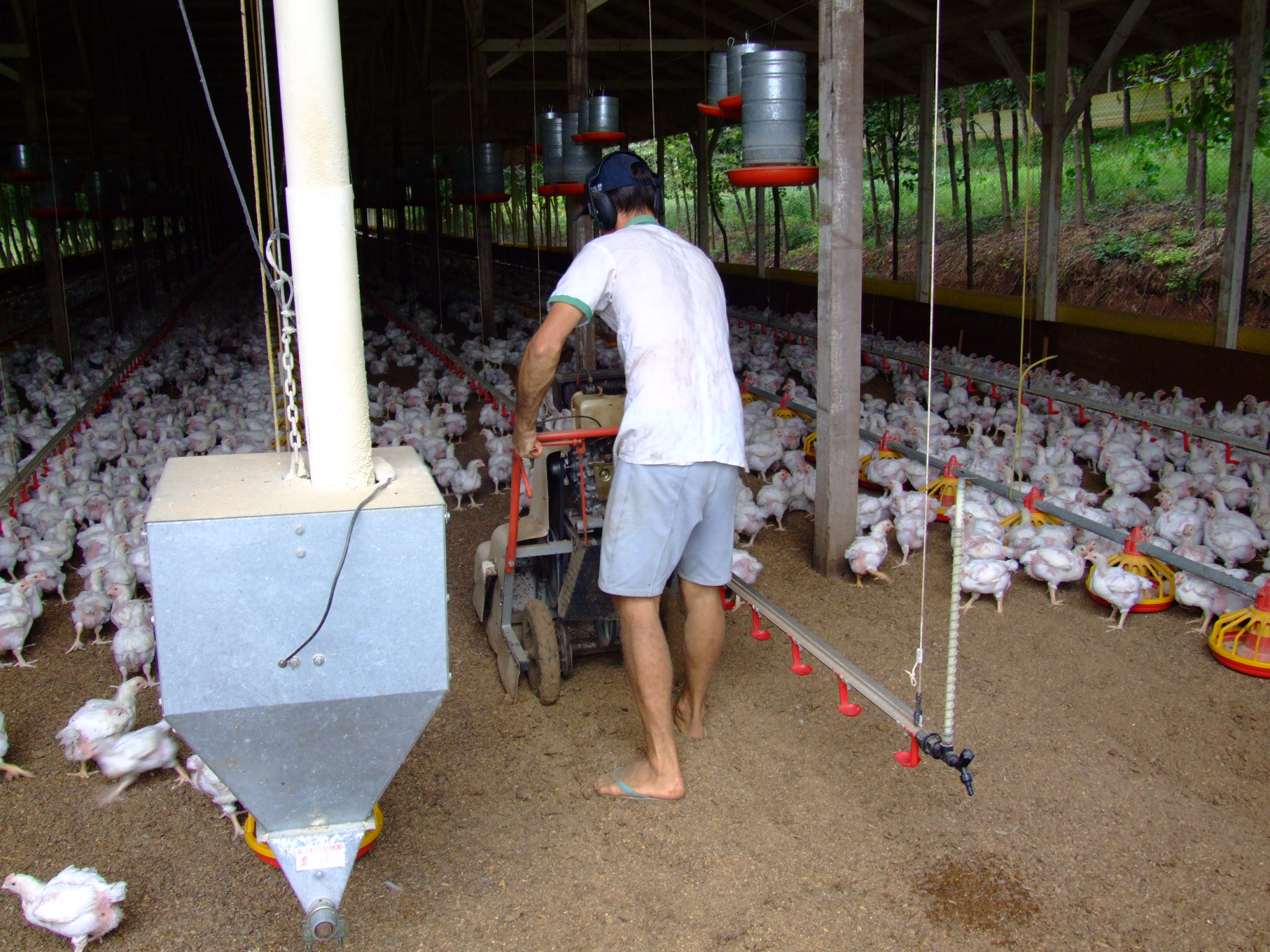
Poultry farming in Campos Novos

In temporary farming, the main crops are corn (140,400 tons produced and 18,000 hectares cultivated), soybean (132,000 tons produced and 40,000 hectares planted), and wheat (30,800 tons produced and 11,000 hectares cultivated). In permanent farming, notable crops include yerba mate (240 tons produced and 60 hectares harvested), oranges (200 tons produced and 20 hectares harvested), and grapes (108 tons produced and 27 hectares harvested).

The city is regarded as the "Santa Catarina granary," being one of the state's leading producers of corn, soybean, beans, wheat, and barley. Agriculture, alongside commerce, is the primary source of income for the municipal economy. Several agricultural cooperatives operate in the city, including Copercampos, established on 8 November 1970, Cooperativa Camponovense (Coocam), founded in 1993, and Apicampos, which supports the beekeeping sector, another prominent activity in Campos Novos. The development of agriculture in the city was significantly influenced by the emergence of these cooperatives starting in the 1970s, which provided substantial support to farmers and ranchers.

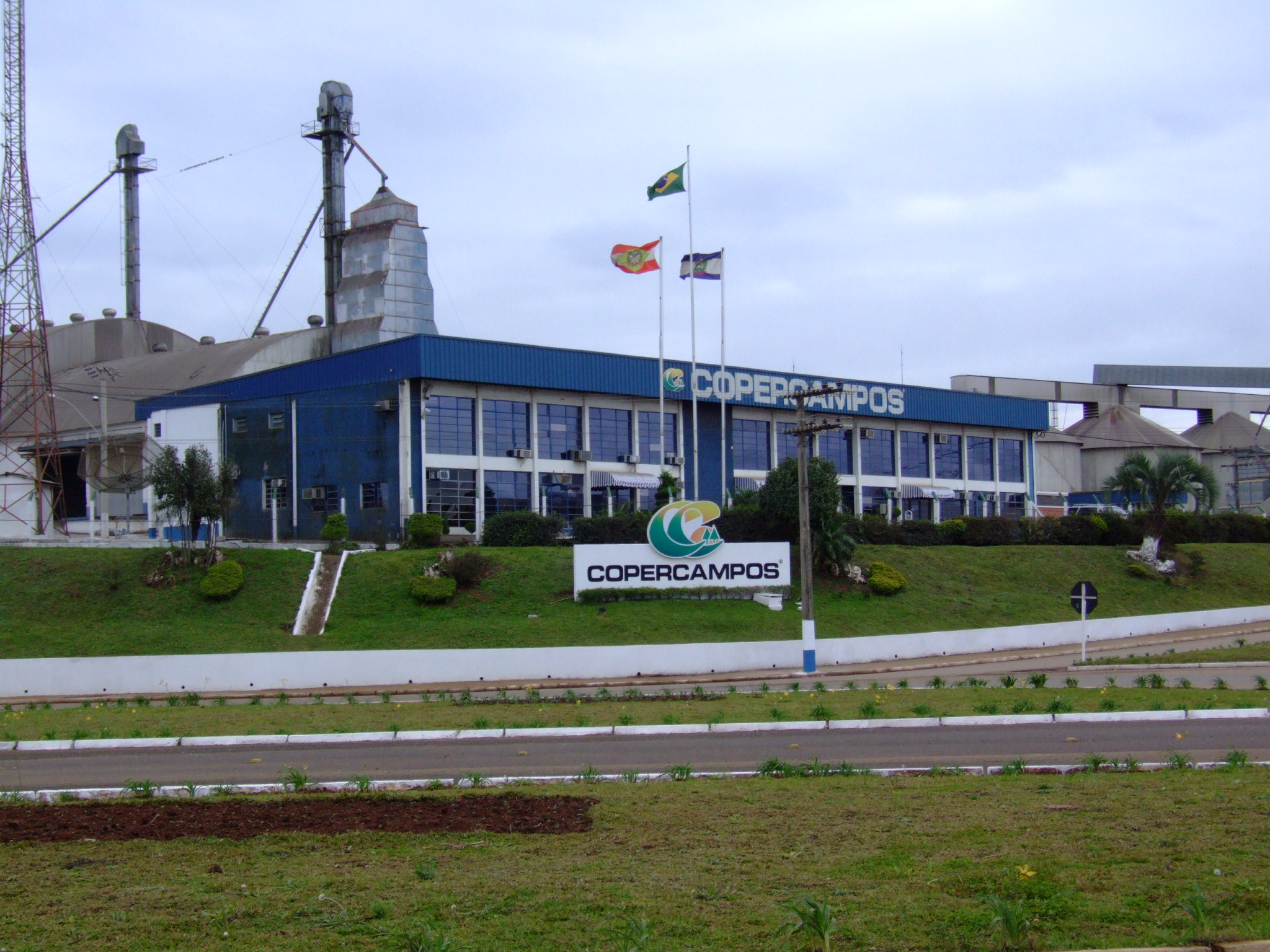
Copercampos headquarters

Secondary sector

The industry sector, in 2011, was the second most significant contributor to the municipal economy. 198,024 thousand reais of the municipal GDP came from the gross added value of industry (secondary sector). Industrial development began to take shape during the 1930s and 1940s, gaining momentum with the arrival of Italian and German descendants. Today, the city aims to industrialize the large volume of raw materials produced within its territory, excelling in areas such as metallurgy, wood processing, clothing manufacturing, and paper production.

The municipality has a designated area for industrial construction and investment, located along the BR-470 highway, with 12 lots of up to 5,000 m². At EXPOCAMPOS, held biennially in May, the city showcases some of its primary achievements in industry, commerce, agribusiness, and craftsmanship.

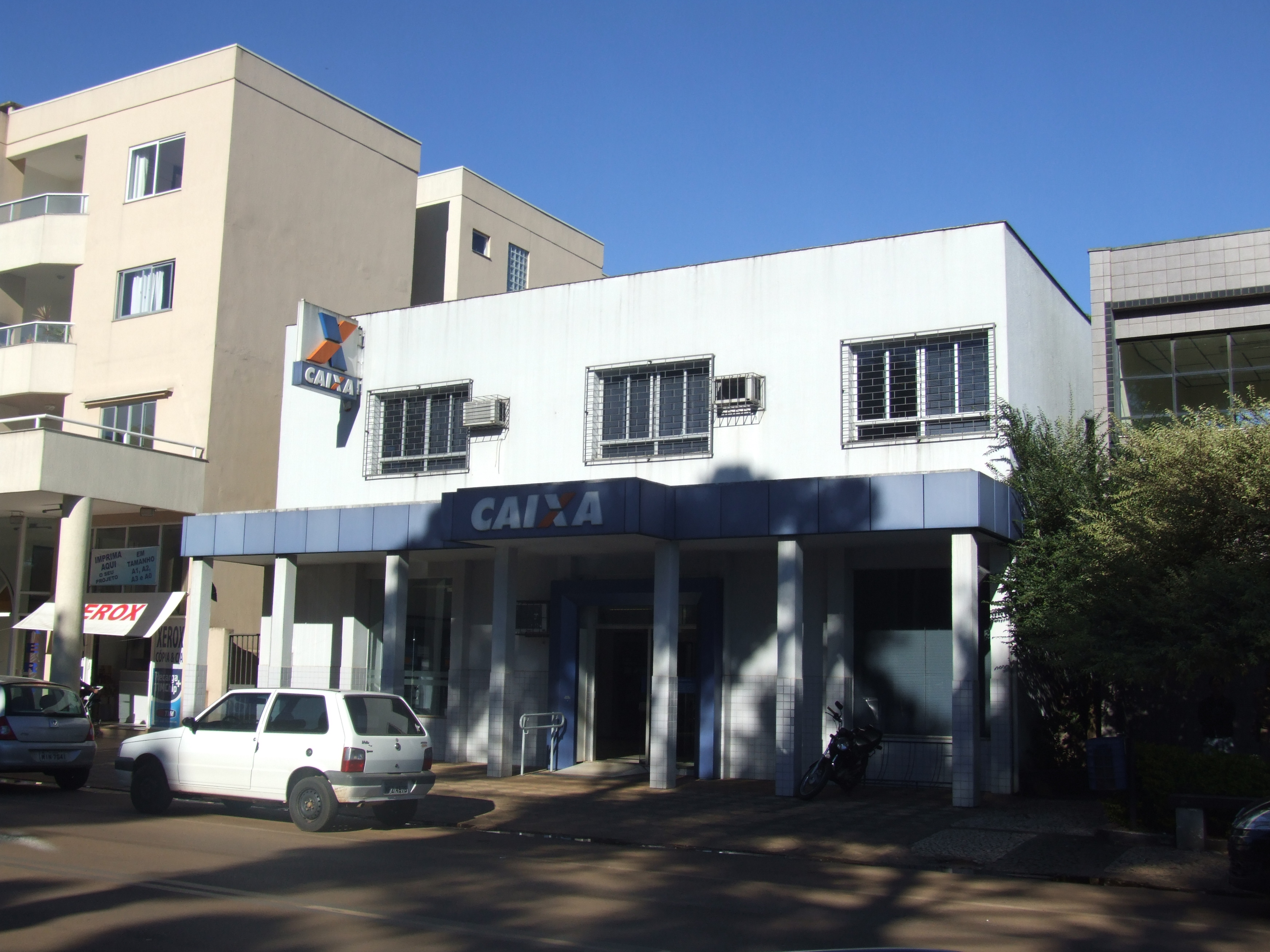
Caixa Econômica Federal branch

Tertiary sector

The provision of services contributes 415,110 thousand reais to the municipal GDP, making it the largest source of Campos Novos' GDP. Commerce in the city began to develop and become more significant in the municipal economy during the first half of the 20th century, driven by the growing presence of Italian and German descendants, as was the case with the industrial sector.

Campos Novos is currently considered the main commercial hub of the Association of Municipalities of the Southern Plateau of Santa Catarina (AMPLASC), an organization that supports the commercial sector of the municipality and its region. Other entities, such as the Campos Novos Chamber of Retail Managers (CDL) and the Campos Novos Commercial and Industrial Association (ACIRCAN), have also contributed to commercial development by supporting small and medium-sized businesses. According to statistics from the Secretariat of Industry and Commerce, a municipal entity that coordinates commercial and industrial activities, the secondary and tertiary sectors together accounted for approximately 700,000 establishments in Campos Novos.

== Urban structure ==
=== Healthcare ===
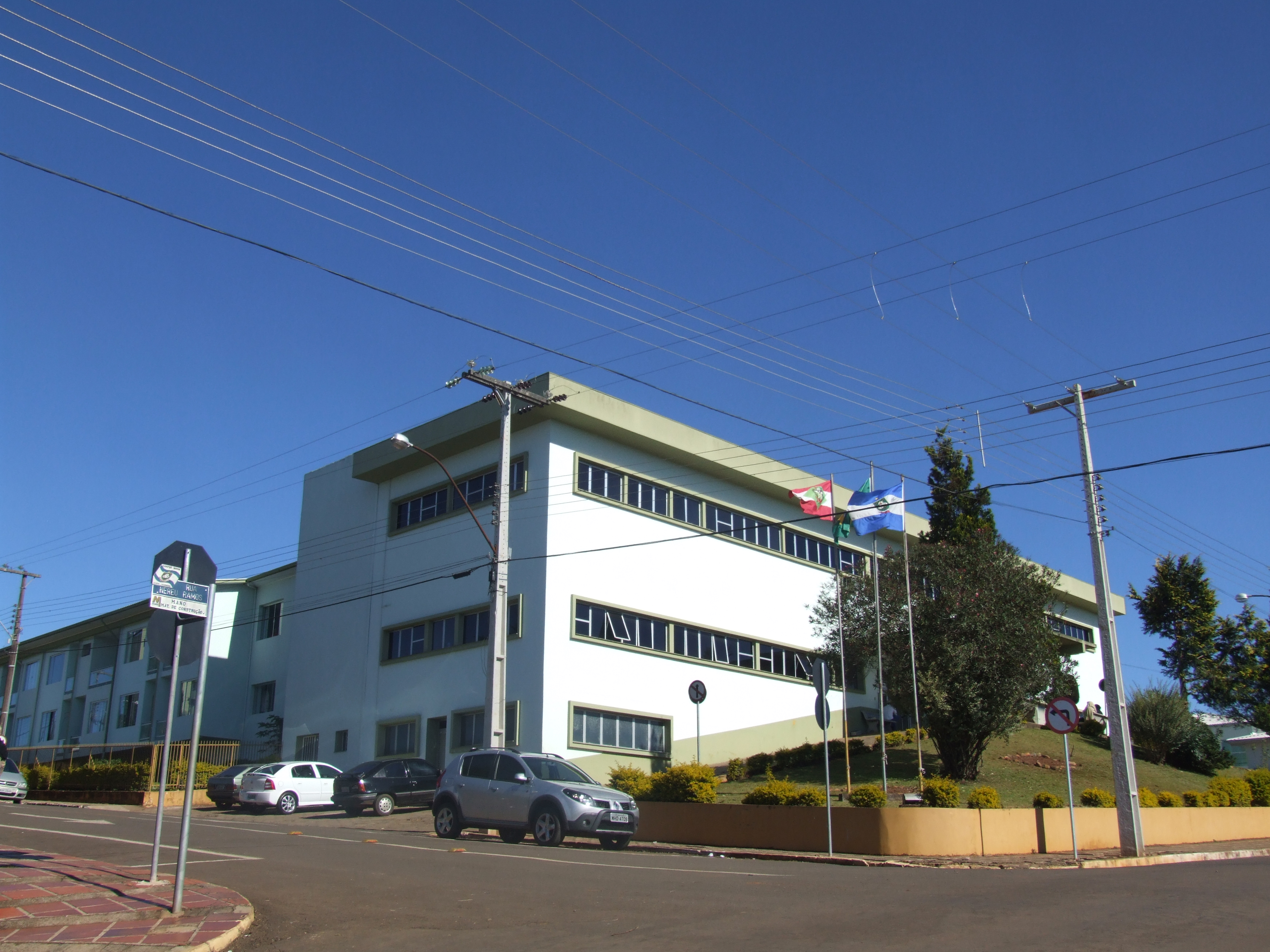
Dr. José Athanásio Hospital

In 2009, the municipality had 21 healthcare facilities, including hospitals, emergency rooms, health centers, and dental services, with 13 being public and seven private. These facilities provided 171 hospital beds, with 95 in public institutions and 76 in private ones. In 2011, 99.3% of children under one year old had up-to-date vaccination records. In 2010, 459 births were recorded, with an infant mortality rate of zero per thousand children under one year old. Additionally, 100% of live births were attended by healthcare professionals. In the same year, 20.3% of pregnant women were under 20 years old. A total of 5,558 children were weighed by the Family Health Program, with 0.4% found to be malnourished.

The Municipal Health Secretariat, directly linked to the municipal government, is responsible for maintaining and operating the Unified Health System (SUS) and developing policies, programs, and projects to promote municipal health. Among the basic support and care services are the Family Health Program (PSF), Paraná Medical Assistance (PAM), and the Mobile Emergency Care Service (SAMU). The Dr. José Athanásio Hospital, with 89 beds (79 under SUS), is managed by the state.

=== Education ===
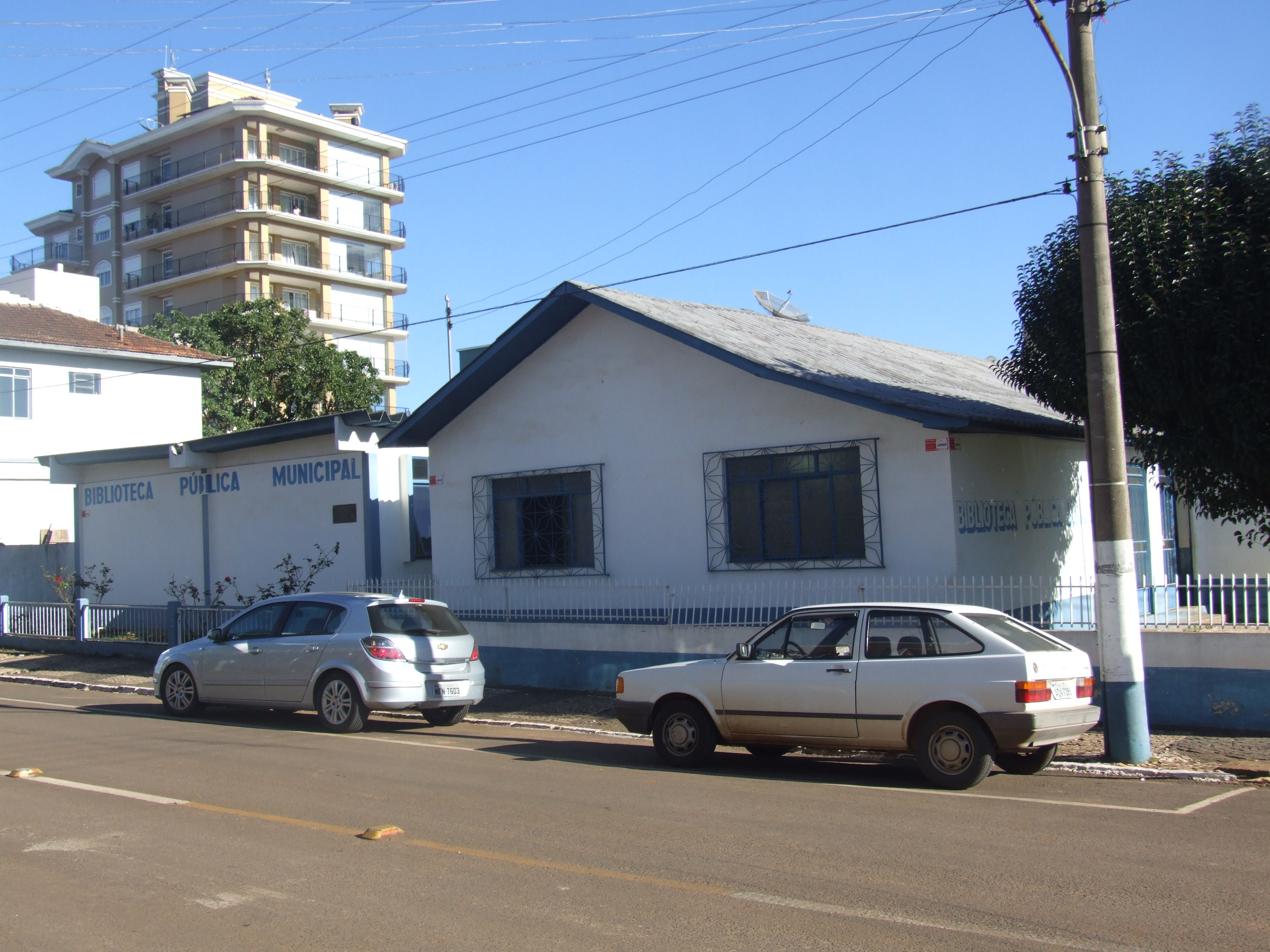
Municipal Public Library

The Basic Education Development Index (IDEB) average for public schools in Campos Novos in 2009 was 4.1 (on a scale from 1 to 10), with 5th-grade students scoring 4.1 and 9th-grade students scoring 3.7; the national average for municipal and state schools was 4.0. In private institutions, the municipal index rises to 6.2 (6.4 for 5th-grade students and 5.9 for 9th-grade students).

In 2009, the municipality had approximately 7,008 enrollments in public and private schools. According to IBGE, in the same year, of the 34 elementary schools, six were state-run, 25 were municipal, and three were private. Of the 68 secondary schools, 32 were state-run, three were municipal, and 33 were private. In 2000, 14.1% of children aged 7 to 14 were not attending elementary school. The completion rate for youths aged 15 to 17 in that year was 67.2%. The literacy rate for the population aged 15 or older in 2010 was 98.7%. In 2006, for every 100 girls in elementary school, there were 112 boys.

The Municipal Secretariat of Education and Culture aims to coordinate and provide administrative and pedagogical support to the Campos Novos school system. Examples of programs coordinated by the Secretariat include the Education for Youth and Adults (EJA), a free education network for adults who have not completed elementary school; the Special Education network, where students with physical disabilities are taught by specialized teachers; and the National School Library Program.

Education in Campos Novos by numbers
Level	Enrollments	Teachers	Schools (total)
Early childhood education	898	91	12
Primary education	5,169	307	34
Secondary education	941	64	4

=== Public safety and crime ===
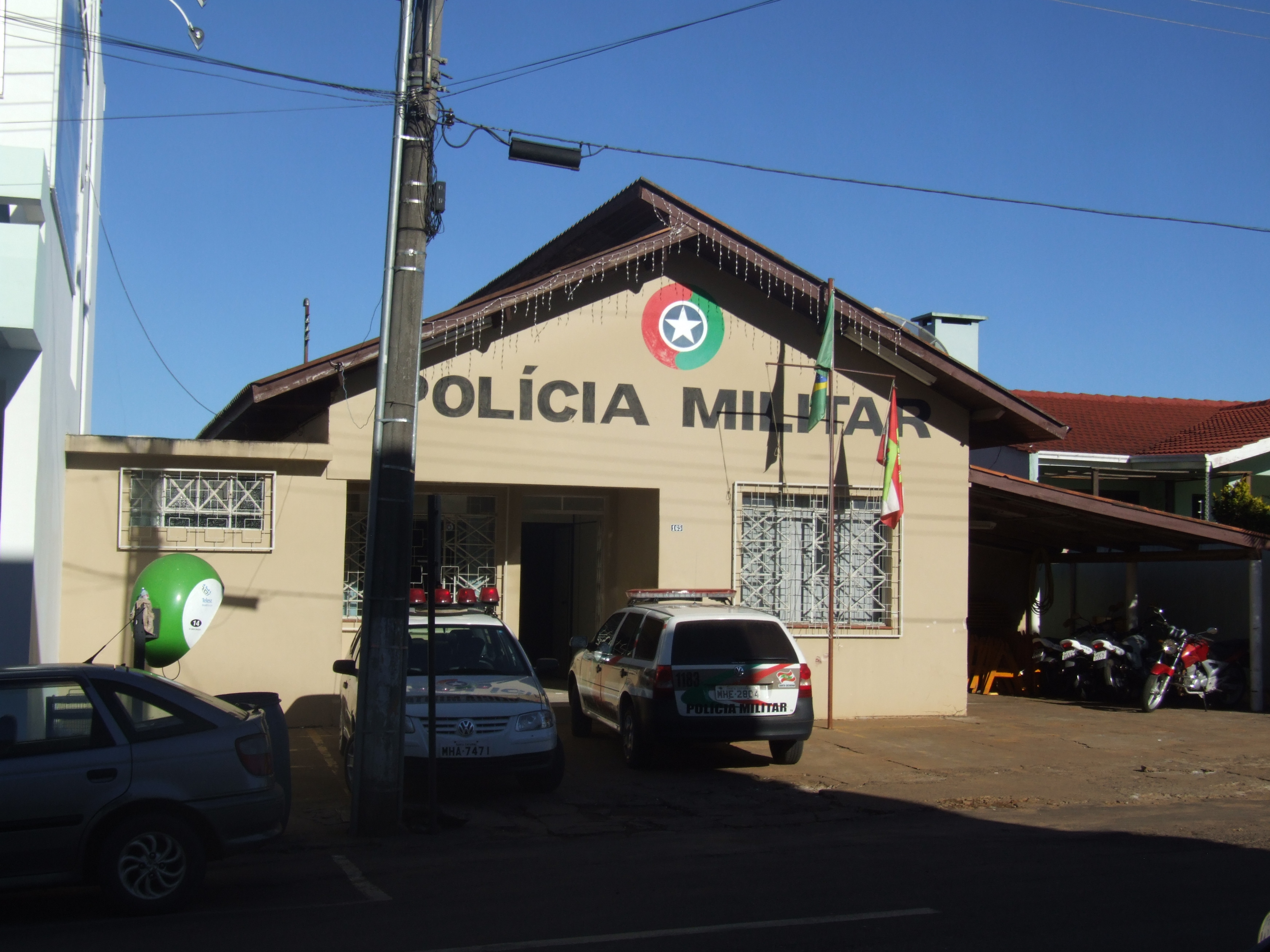
PMSC station

Public safety in Campos Novos is provided by various organizations. The Municipality maintains a Municipal Guard, tasked with protecting municipal assets, services, and facilities, and collaborating with municipal inspection agencies. The Municipal Civil Defense Council (Comdec), established by Ordinance Law 2,373 on November 24, 1997, is responsible for preventive, assistance, recovery, and rescue operations in situations involving public risk. It supports the Fire Department, which focuses on rescue operations and emergencies.

The Military Police is a state force responsible for policing, patrolling banks and the environment, and overseeing prisons, schools, and special events. The force also carries out social integration activities. The Civil Police focuses on investigating and addressing crimes and infractions. Various efforts have been undertaken by state and municipal authorities to enhance city safety, such as increasing police personnel and holding public safety meetings and lectures.

=== Housing, services, and communications ===
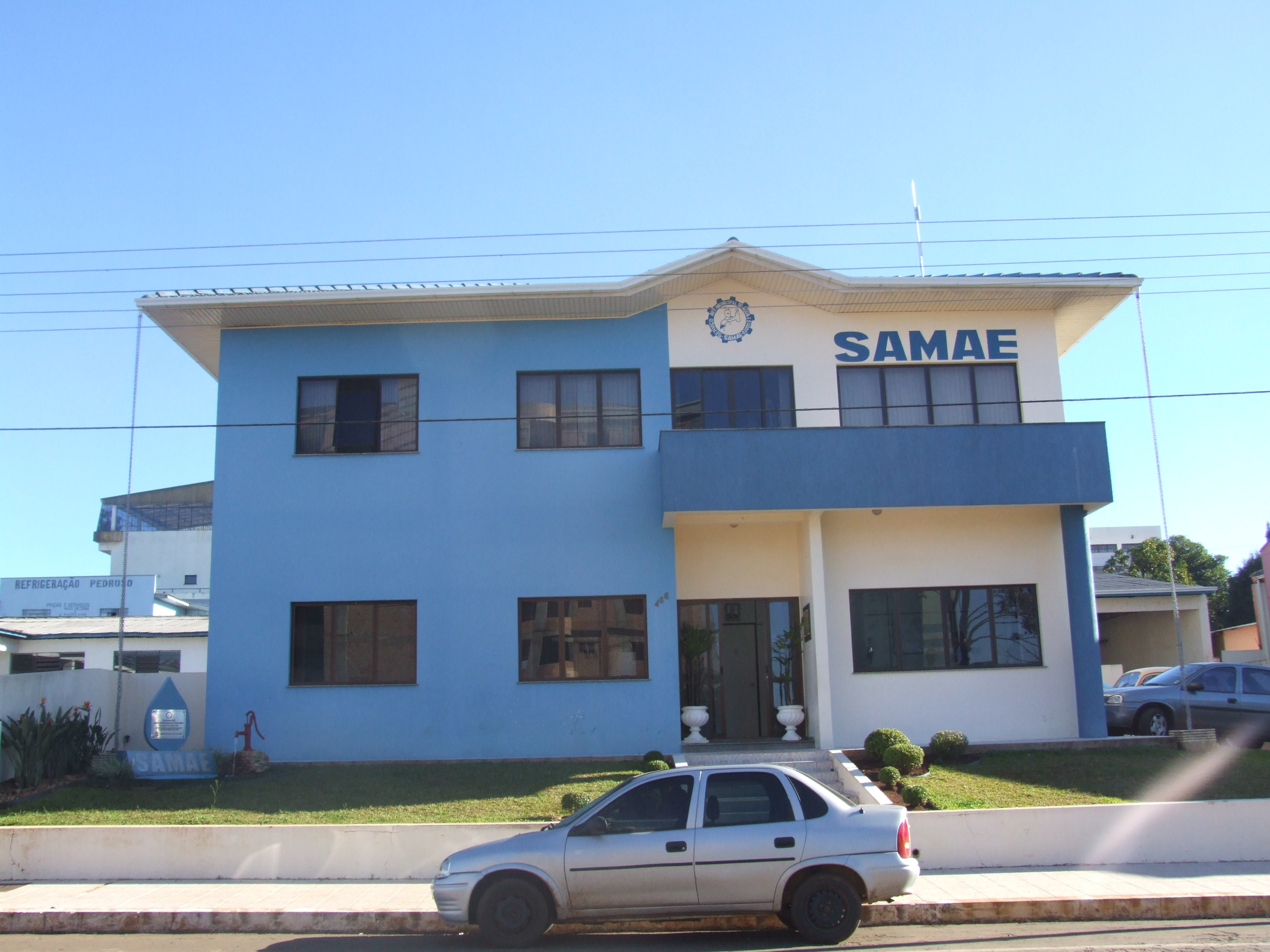
Headquarters of the Municipal Autonomous Water and Sewage Service (SAMAE)

In 2010, according to IBGE, the city had 10,526 permanent private households, including 9,719 houses, 786 apartments, 13 houses in villages or condominiums, and eight rooms or shanties. Of the total households, 7,485 were owned properties, with 7,058 fully paid, 427 under acquisition, and 1,820 rented; 1,206 properties were provided, with 542 by employers and 664 through other means. Fifteen were occupied in other ways. Most of the municipality has access to treated water, electricity, sewage, urban cleaning, fixed telephony, and mobile telephony. In that year, 83.89% of households were served by the general water supply network; 85.25% had some form of waste collection, and 59.14% had sewage disposal through the general sewer or stormwater network.

The first water supply system in Campos Novos was established through funding from the Inter-American Development Bank (IDB) and the National Health Foundation (FUNASA), which initially managed it. On 8 August 1966, the Municipal Autonomous Water and Sewage Service (SAMAE) was created to support the system. In 1999, FUNASA ceased operations, and the administration of the service was transferred to the municipality. Today, the city has a water treatment plant (ETA) located in the Ibicuí district, also managed by SAMAE.

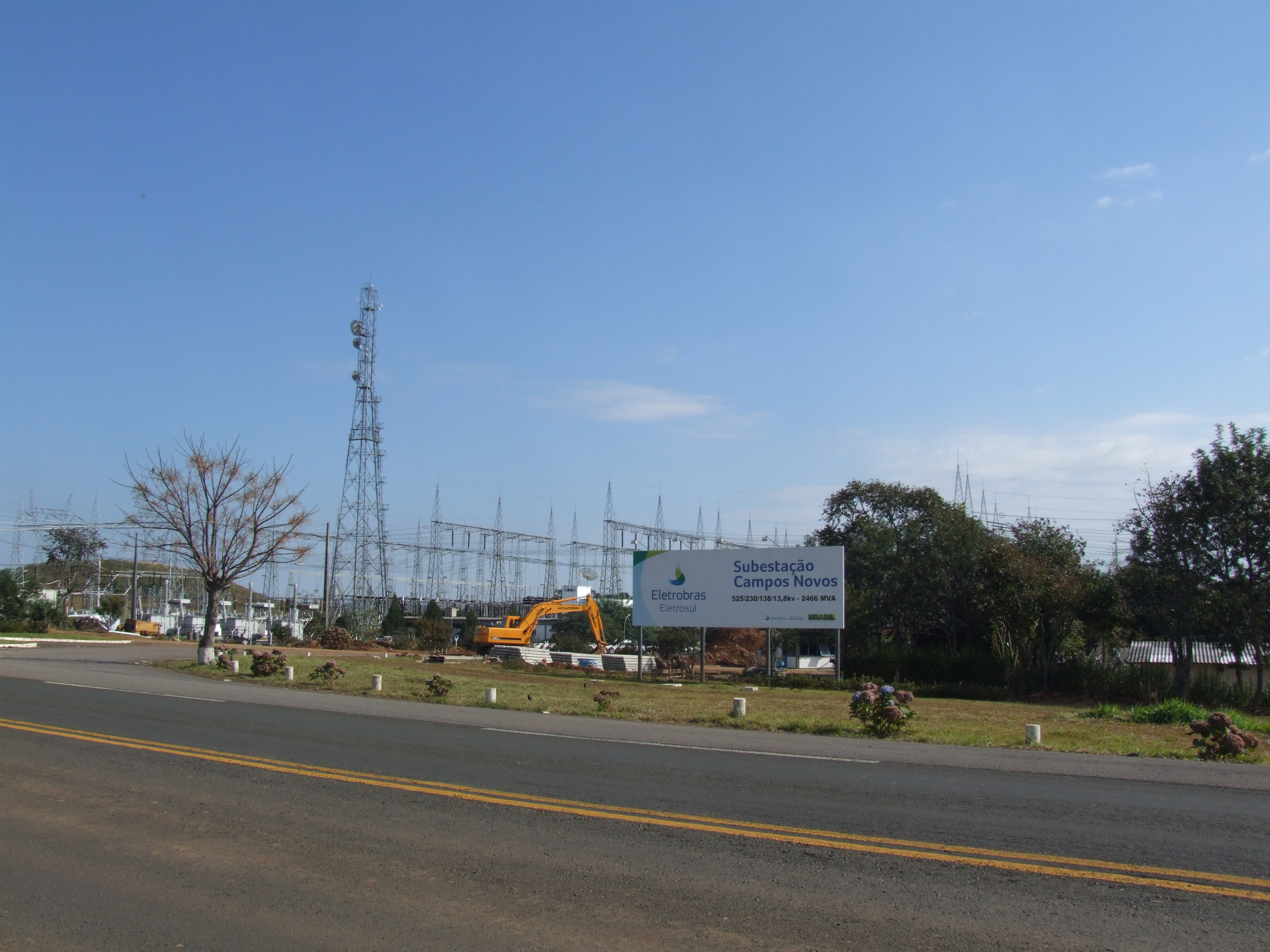
Eletrobras substation

The Santa Catarina Electric Power Company (CELESC) is responsible for electricity supply in Campos Novos and several other municipalities in the state. In 2010, 99.8% of households in the municipality were served by the electricity service. The city's electricity is generated by the Campos Novos Hydroelectric Power Plant, managed by Campos Novos Energia S.A., which also supplies 25% of Santa Catarina's energy needs. Internet services, including dial-up and broadband (ADSL), are provided by various free and paid ISPs. Mobile phone services are offered by several operators, and some areas have wireless internet access. The area code (DDD) for Campos Novos is 049, and the postal code (CEP) is 89620-000.

Several television channels are available in the VHF and UHF bands, along with two newspapers. The first radio station in the city, Rádio Cultura de Campos Novos, was founded in 1957 to meet the growing population's need for information and cultural access.

=== Transportation ===
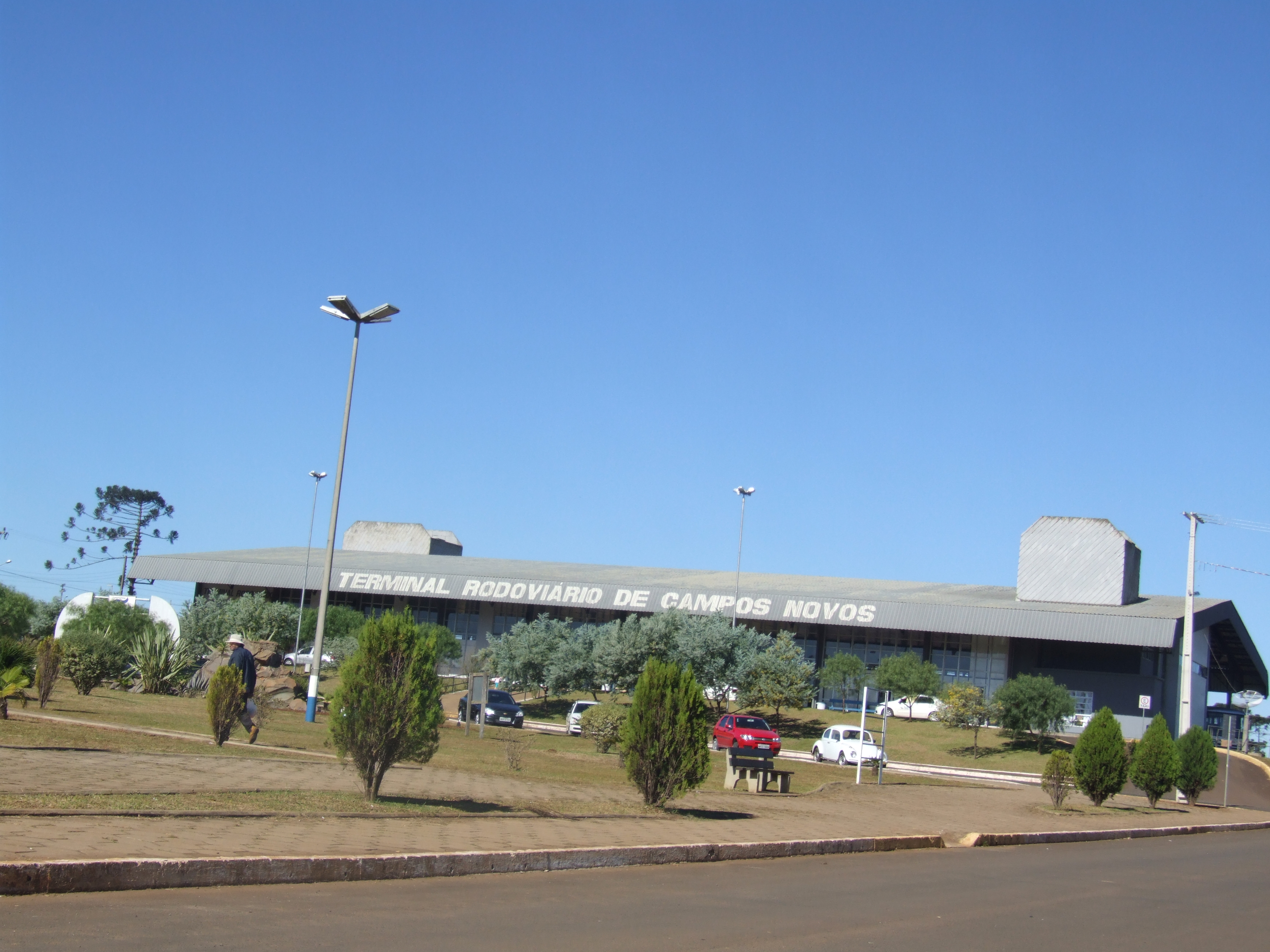
Campos Novos Bus Terminal

The municipality was once served by railways. A railway station was located in what is now the Leão district, inaugurated on 23 February 1926 as part of the São Paulo-Rio Grande Railway. It operated until 1997, when the railway was abandoned by its operator, the Federal Railway Network (RFFSA), and was later demolished.

The decline of railways was due to the expansion of highways and airports. By land, the municipality is situated at the intersection of the BR-282, BR-470, SC-455, SC-458, and SC-456 highways, connecting it to nearby towns, the state capital, major Brazilian cities, and other Mercosur cities. Campos Novos has a bus terminal located in the city center, primarily connecting to various cities in Santa Catarina and Rio Grande do Sul. The city also has a public transportation system linking the downtown area to neighborhoods and districts with bus stops established by the municipality, regulated by Law No. 2364 of 9 October 2001. Several airports operate near Campos Novos, such as the Joaçaba Airport (IATA: JCB, ICAO: SSJA), located in Joaçaba, approximately 50 km from the city center.

In 2010, the municipal vehicle fleet consisted of 14,873 vehicles, including 9,380 cars, 877 trucks, 241 tractor-trucks, 1,529 pickups, 324 vans, 59 minibuses, 1,442 motorcycles, 356 mopeds, 92 buses, two wheel tractors, 52 utility vehicles, and 519 other types of vehicles. Dual carriageways, paved roads, and numerous traffic lights facilitate traffic flow, but the increase in vehicles over the past decade has led to increasingly slow traffic, particularly in the municipal seat. Additionally, finding parking spaces in the commercial center has become challenging, causing some losses to local businesses.

== Culture ==
The Municipal Secretariat of Education and Culture oversees the cultural sector in Campos Novos, aiming not only to support education but also to plan and implement cultural policies through programs, projects, and activities that foster cultural development.

=== Performing arts and events ===
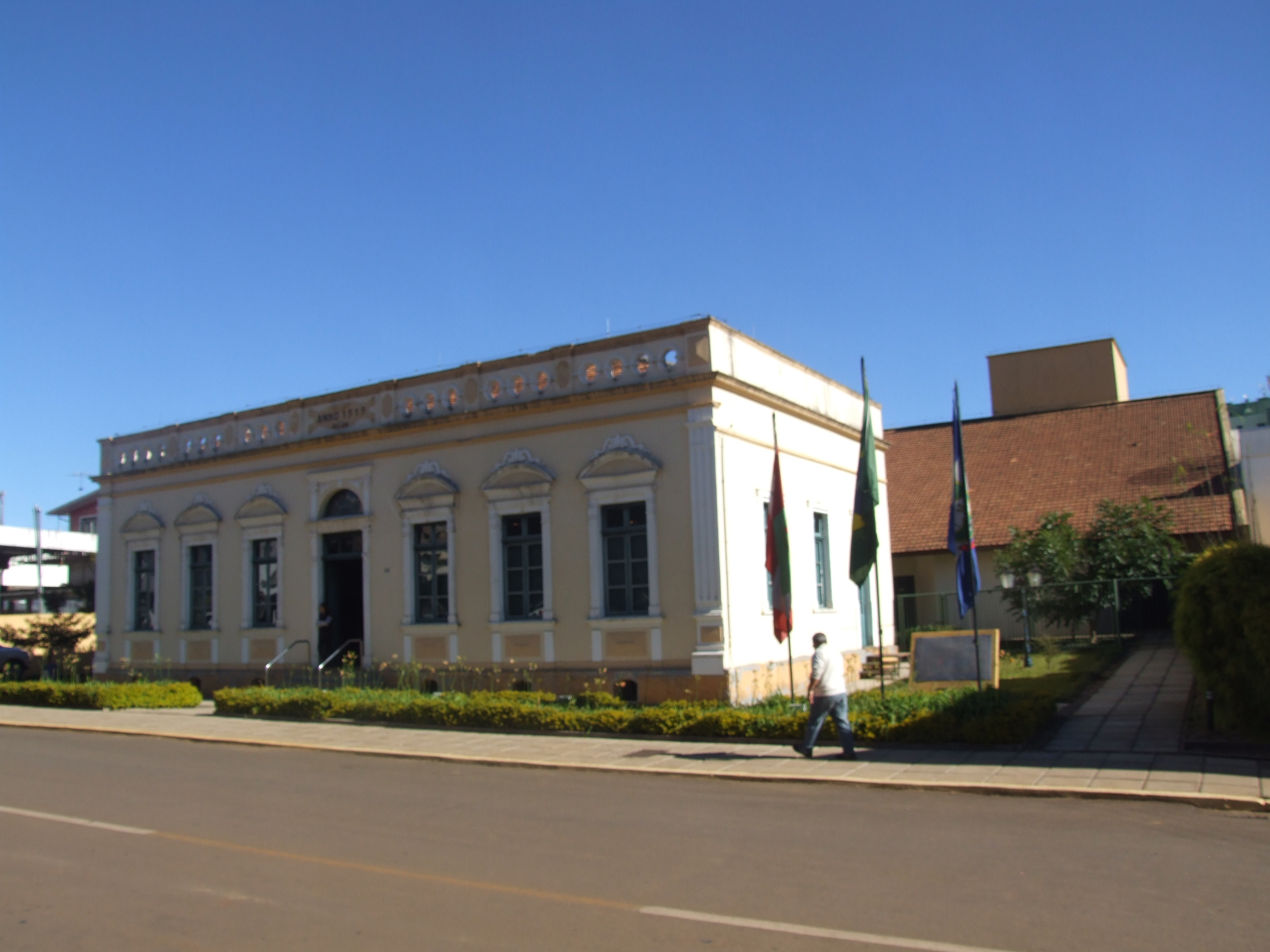
Sebastião Paz de Almeida Historical and Archaeological Museum

The Cid Caesar de Almeida Pedroso Cultural Foundation, established by Law No. 2,050 of 17 March 1994, is a cultural institution linked to the culture secretariat, housed in the former city hall building constructed in 1919, which served as the seat of the executive and legislative branches until 1975. The building was transformed into the Coronel Gasparino Zorzi House of Culture, serving as a venue for various cultural activities such as music, visual arts, dance, theater, workshops, and events. The Foundation also manages the Dr. Waldemar Rupp Historical Archive, the municipal public historical archive, and the Sebastião Paz de Almeida Historical and Archaeological Museum.

To promote local socioeconomic development, the culture secretariat, often in collaboration with other local institutions and companies, has increased investment in festivals and events. Notable annual events include the Copercampos Field Day, showcasing Copercampos’ work in February or March; the city’s anniversary, officially on 30 March but celebrated throughout the month; the Feast of the Patron Saint John the Baptist in June, featuring masses and June festivals; the Our Lady of Aparecida Pilgrimage, held annually on 12 October, the saint’s day, attracting an average of 70,000 faithful who walk 3 km from the Parish Church to the city’s sanctuary; and the Miss Campos Novos Contest in November. Additionally, the EXPOCAMPOS, a traditional agricultural fair, is held biennially.

=== Attractions ===
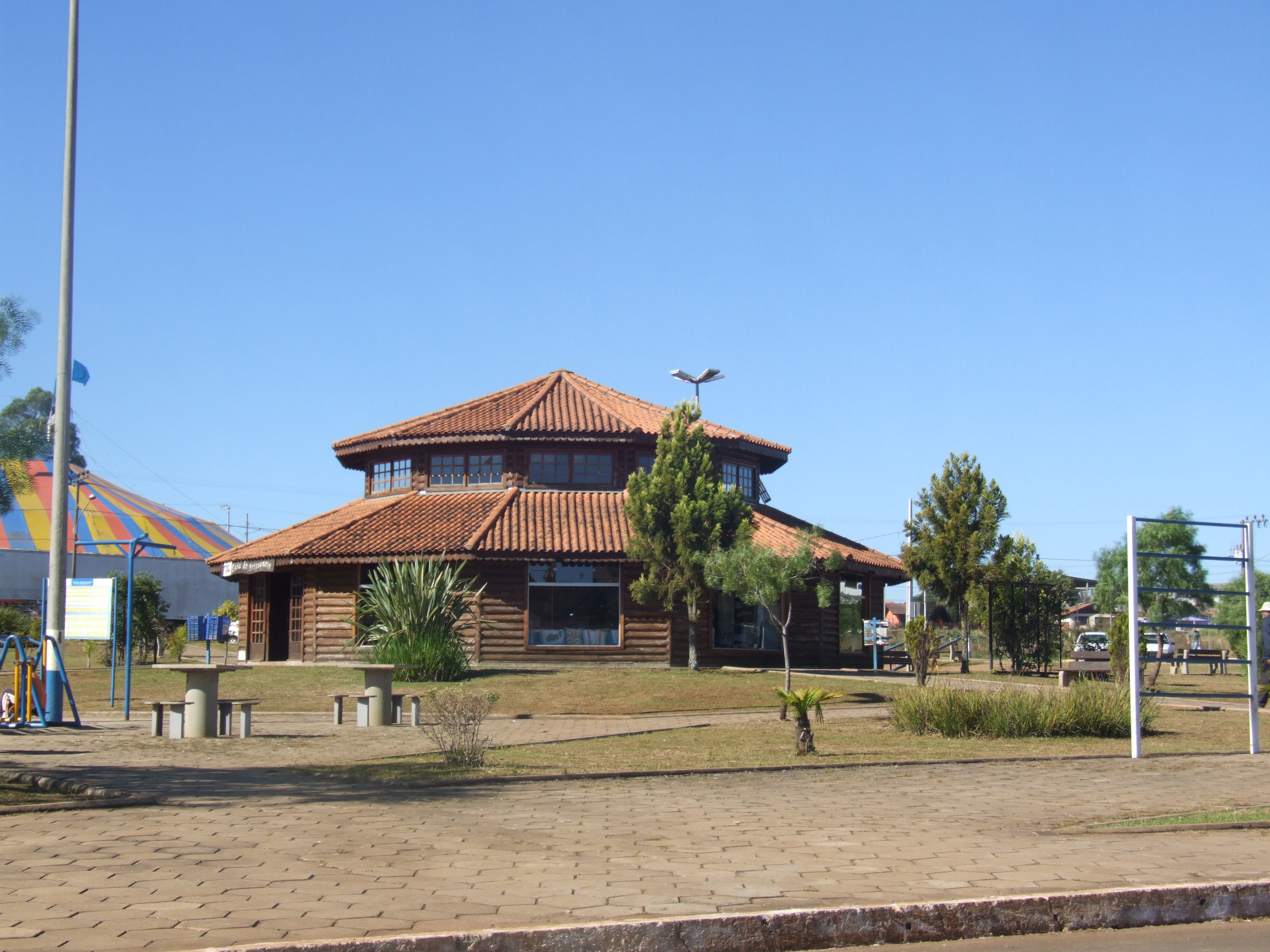
House of Handicrafts

The city offers several inns, farms, and hotels in rural areas, focusing on ecotourism. The Cervo and Santa Mônica Farms and the Triunfo Farmstead offer hiking trails, camping areas, horseback riding, and fishing facilities. Visitors can also schedule a tour of the Campos Novos Hydroelectric Power Plant. In the Barra do Leão district, the Leonense Hot Springs offer sulfurous hot springs with an average temperature of 33 °C, featuring camping areas and indoor pools. These waters are believed to aid in treating rheumatism, arthritis, stomach issues, skin conditions, fatigue, and insomnia.

In the urban area, the city boasts several attractions of historical and cultural significance. Notable sites include the São João Batista Parish Church, located opposite Lauro Müller Square, known for its interior adorned with wooden sculptures, stained glass, and paintings; the Our Lady of Aparecida Sanctuary; and the Coronel Gasparino Zorzi House of Culture, which is housed in a building that served as the city hall, inaugurated in 1919 and designated as a municipal historical heritage site.

=== Sports ===
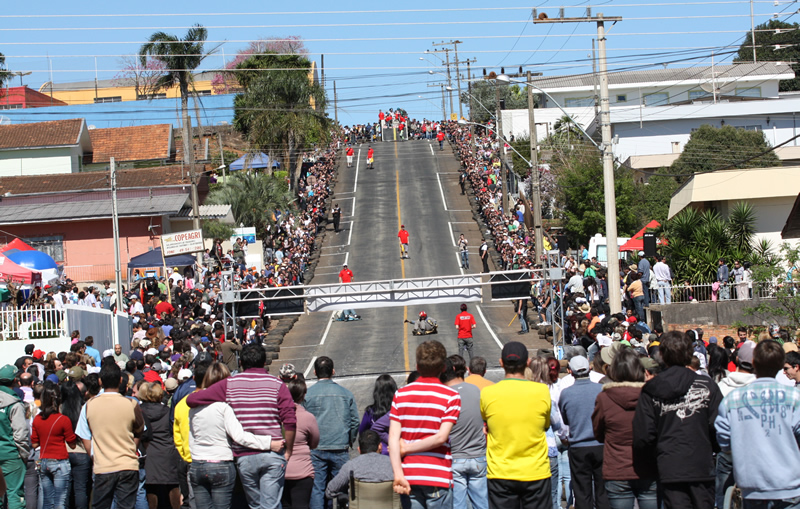
Street soapbox car championship held in 2010

The Secretariat of Sports and Leisure regularly organizes various sporting events, such as the Amateur Soccer Championship, the Centenary Cup, the Quadrangular de Bolão Tournament, the Bocce Tournament, the Volleyball Tournament, and the Rádio Cultura Futsal Cup. The ACAMB (Campos Novos Basketball Association) collaborates with the municipality to organize events such as the Regional Soccer Championship, Regional and State Karate Championships, the State Judo Championship, and the Athletics Championship. The secretariat also maintains sports schools for children, with approximately 900 participants, and organizes the Campos Novos School Games (JECAM), involving around 1,500 students from municipal, state, and private schools annually.

The city’s main soccer team is Clube Atlético Camponovense, founded on 3 August 1991, which plays its matches at the Cid Pedroso Stadium, with a capacity of approximately 4,000 people. Other sports facilities include the Osni Jacomel Gymnasium, the Humberto Calgaro and Juvelino Fernandes Gymnasiums, some of which feature skate parks, tennis courts, street basketball courts, and beach volleyball courts.

=== Holidays ===
Campos Novos observes three municipal holidays, as defined by the Municipal Organic Law, along with eight national holidays and additional optional holidays. The municipal holidays are the city’s emancipation day on 30 March; the day of the patron saint John the Baptist on 24 June; and the day of Our Lady of Aparecida on 12 October. According to federal law No. 9,093, enacted on 12 September 1995, municipalities may have up to four religious municipal holidays, including Good Friday.

== See also ==
- List of municipalities in Santa Catarina
