= Vargem, Santa Catarina =

Vargem
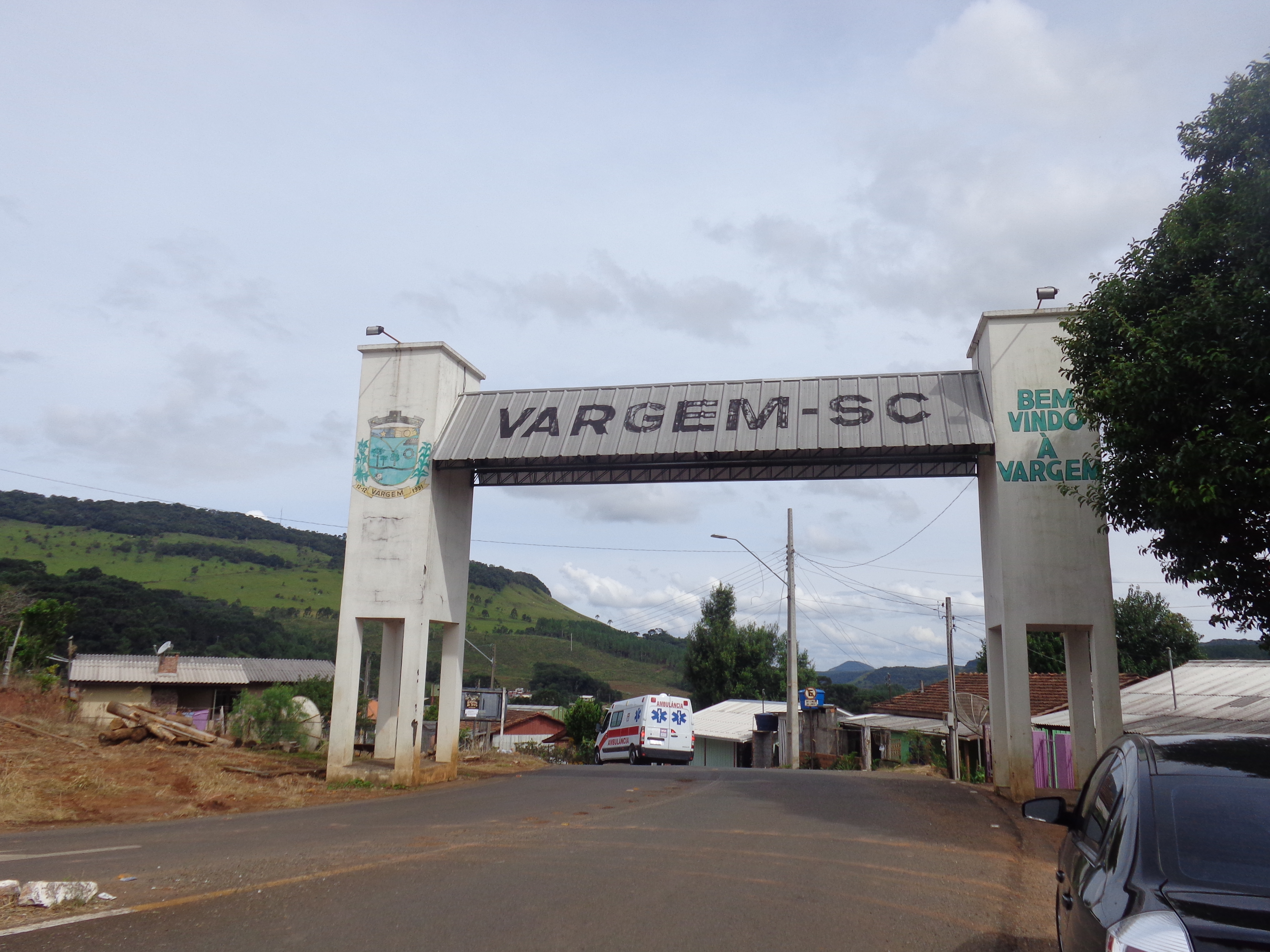

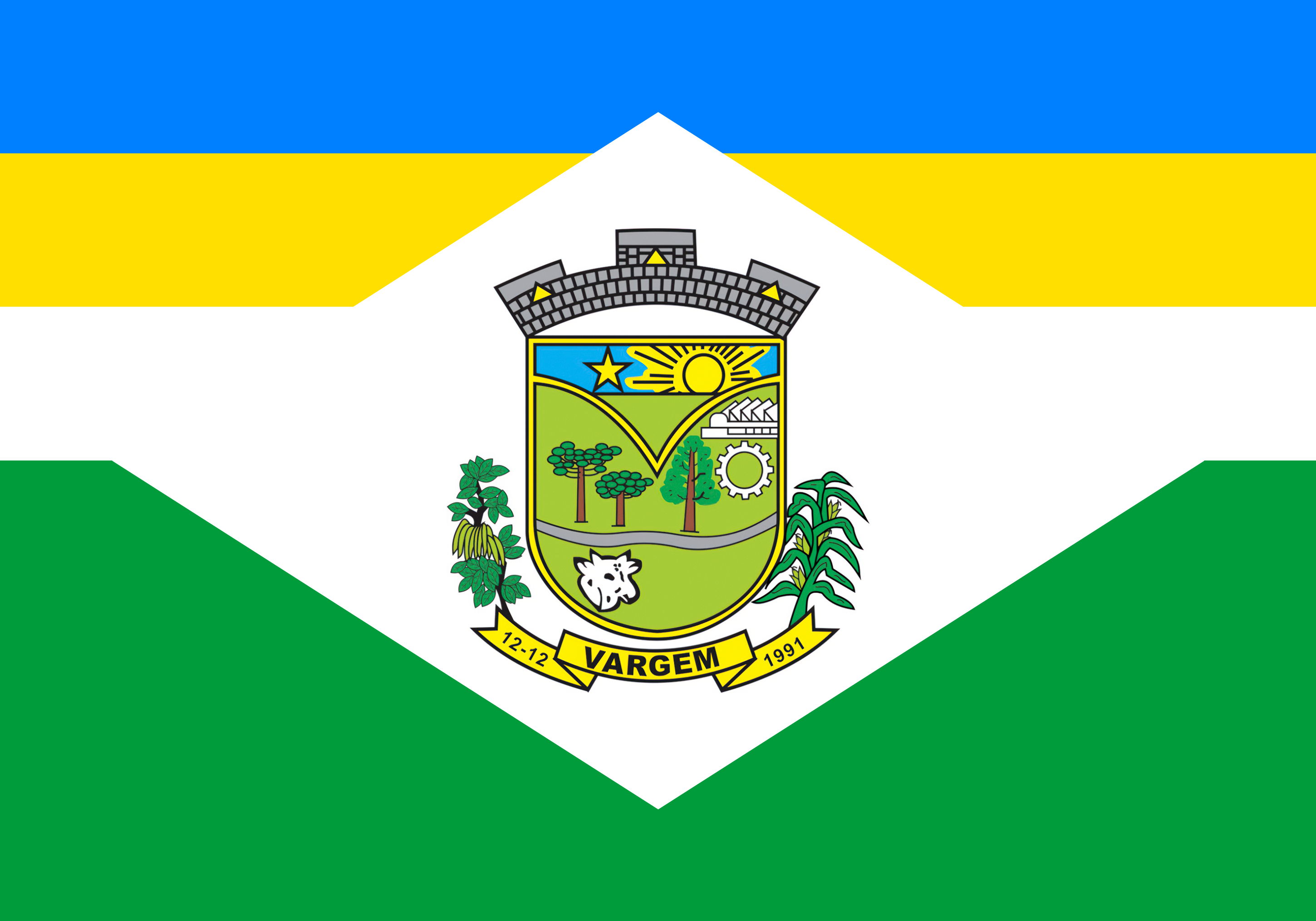
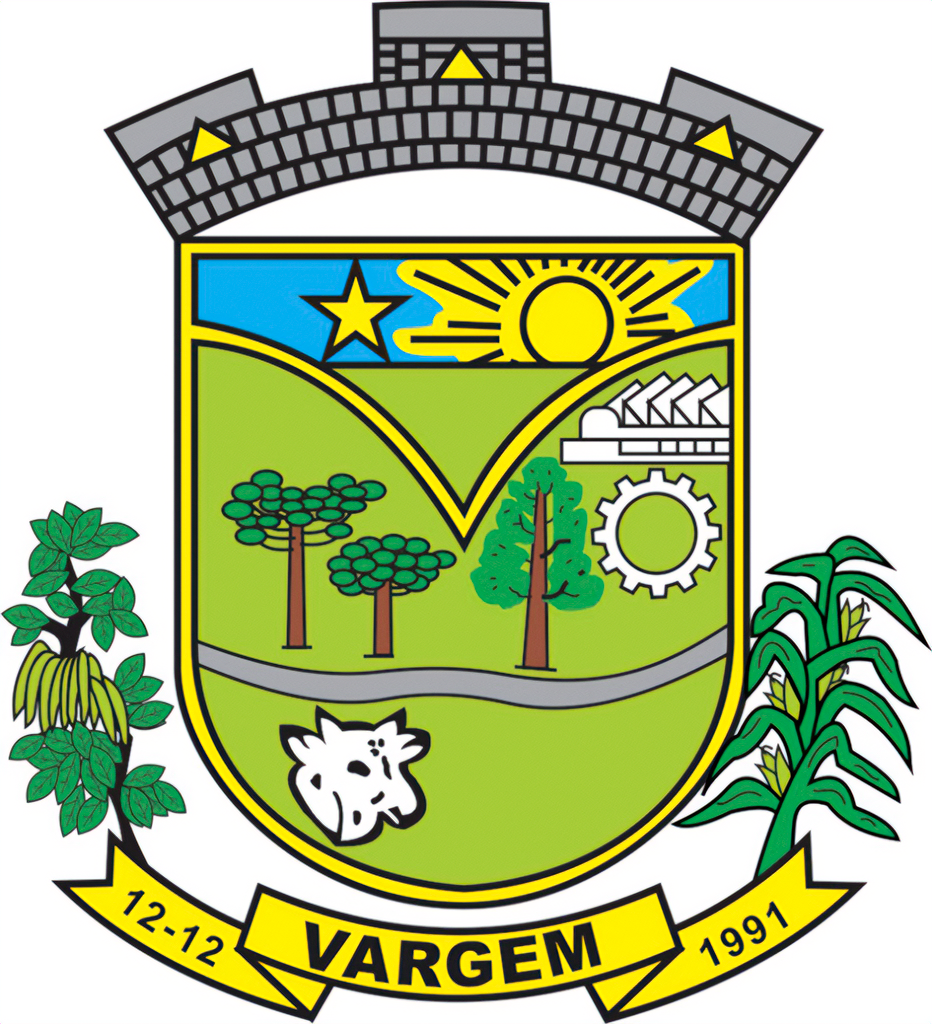
- Flag Coat of arms

- Location of Vargem

- Location within Brazil
- Coordinates: 27°29′21″S 50°58′30″W
- Country: Brazil
- Region: South
- State: (Santa Catarina (state)) Santa Catarina
- Founded: December 12, 1991

Government
  - Mayor: Perci Jose Salmoria

Area
  - Total: 350.124 km^{2} (135.184 sq mi)
- Elevation: 768 m (2,520 ft)

Population (2020)
  - Total: 2,432
  - Density: 9.1/km^{2} (24/sq mi)
- Time zone: UTC-3 (UTC-3)
  - Summer (DST): UTC-2 (UTC-2)
- HDI (2000): 0.768
- Website: www.vargem.sc.gov.br

Vargem is a city in Santa Catarina, in the Southern Region of Brazil.
