= Zortéa =

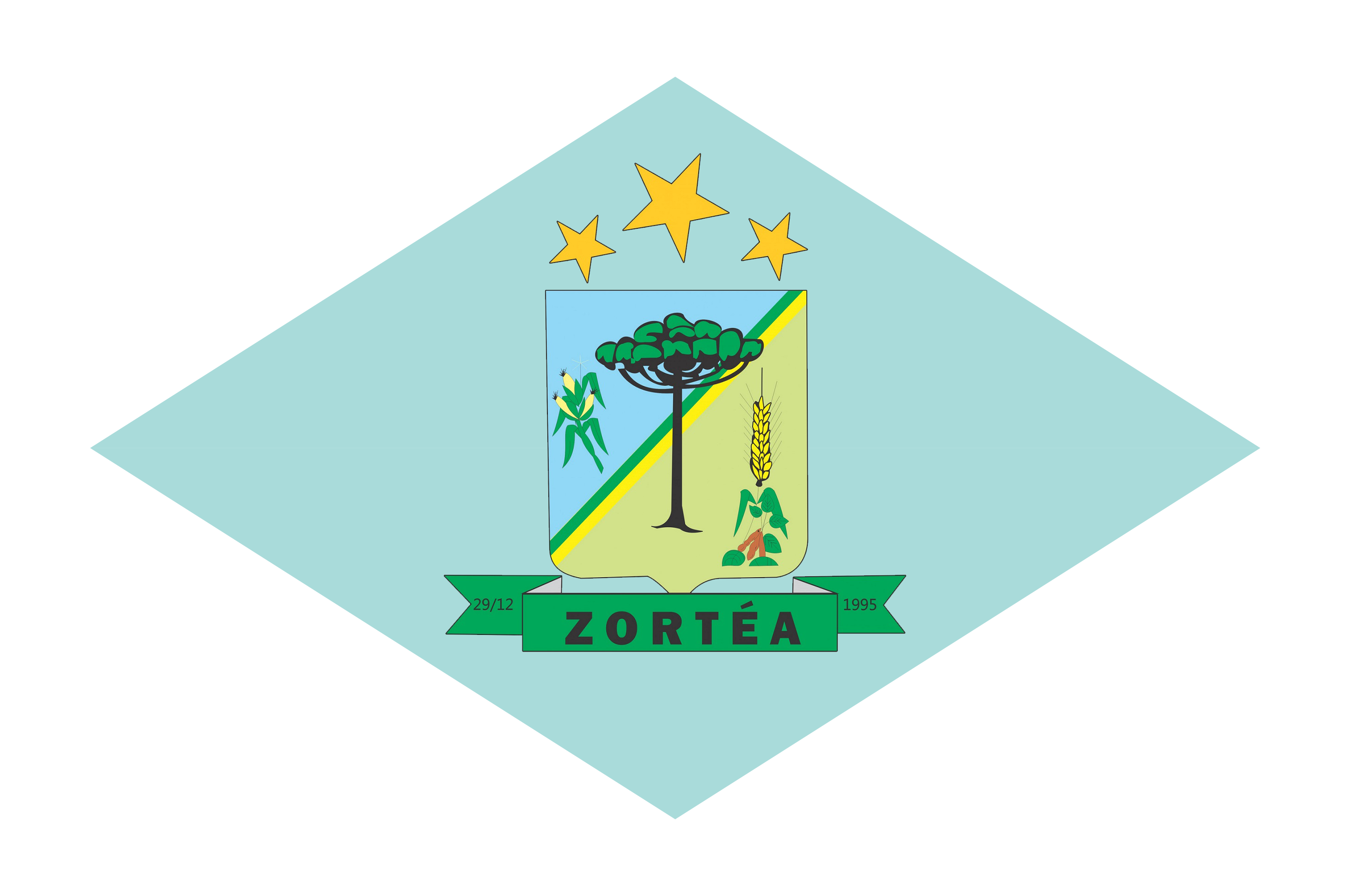
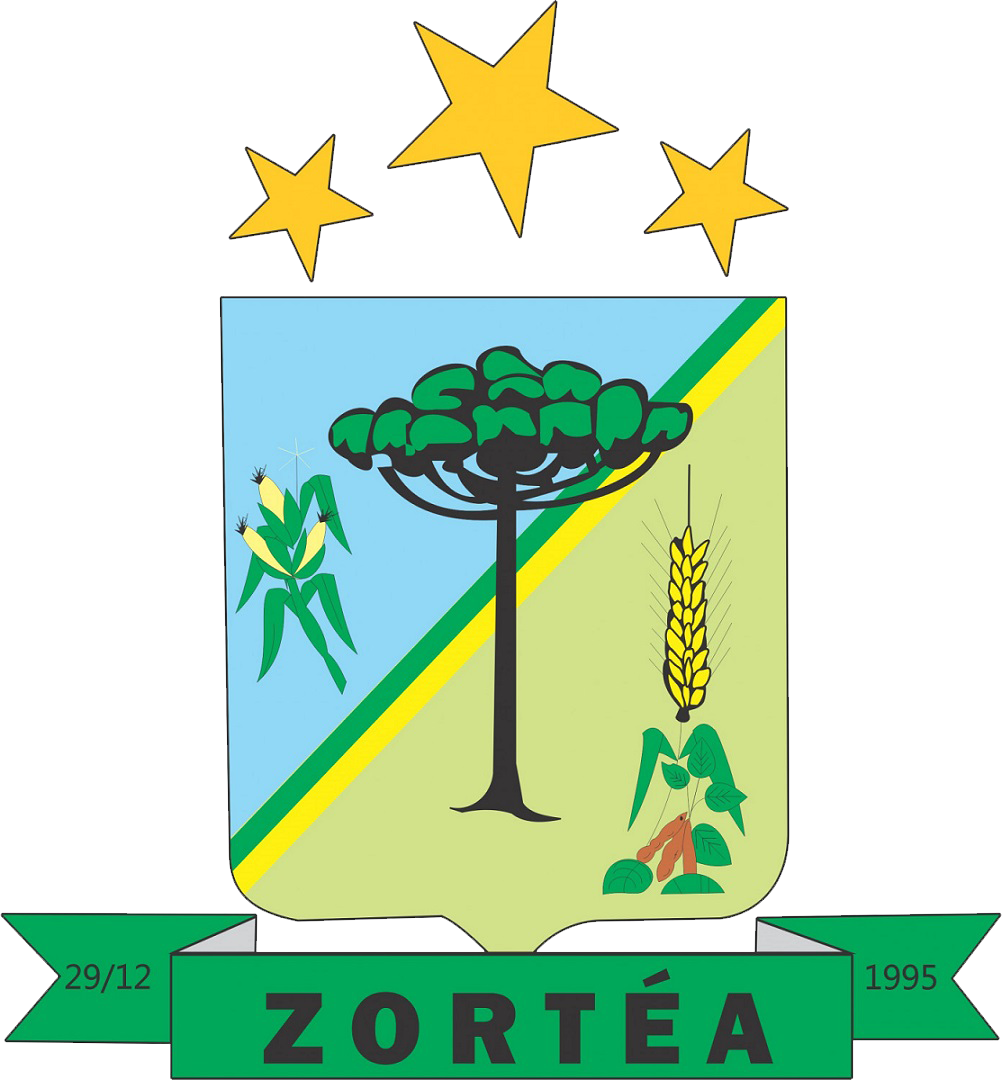
- Flag Coat of arms

- Location of Zortéa

- Location within Brazil
- Coordinates: 27°27′03″S 51°33′18″W
- Country: Brazil
- Region: South
- State: (Santa Catarina (state)) Santa Catarina
- Founded: January 1, 1997

Government
  - Mayor: Remilton Andreoni

Area
  - Total: 190.149 km^{2} (73.417 sq mi)
- Elevation: 680 m (2,230 ft)

Population (2020)
  - Total: 3,398
  - Density: 15.1/km^{2} (39/sq mi)
- Time zone: UTC-3 (UTC-3)
  - Summer (DST): UTC-2 (UTC-2)
- HDI (2000): 0.798
- Website: www.zortea.sc.gov.br

Zortéa is a city in Santa Catarina, in the Southern Region of Brazil.
