= Ibiam =

Coordinates: 27°10′S 51°14′W

- Municipality
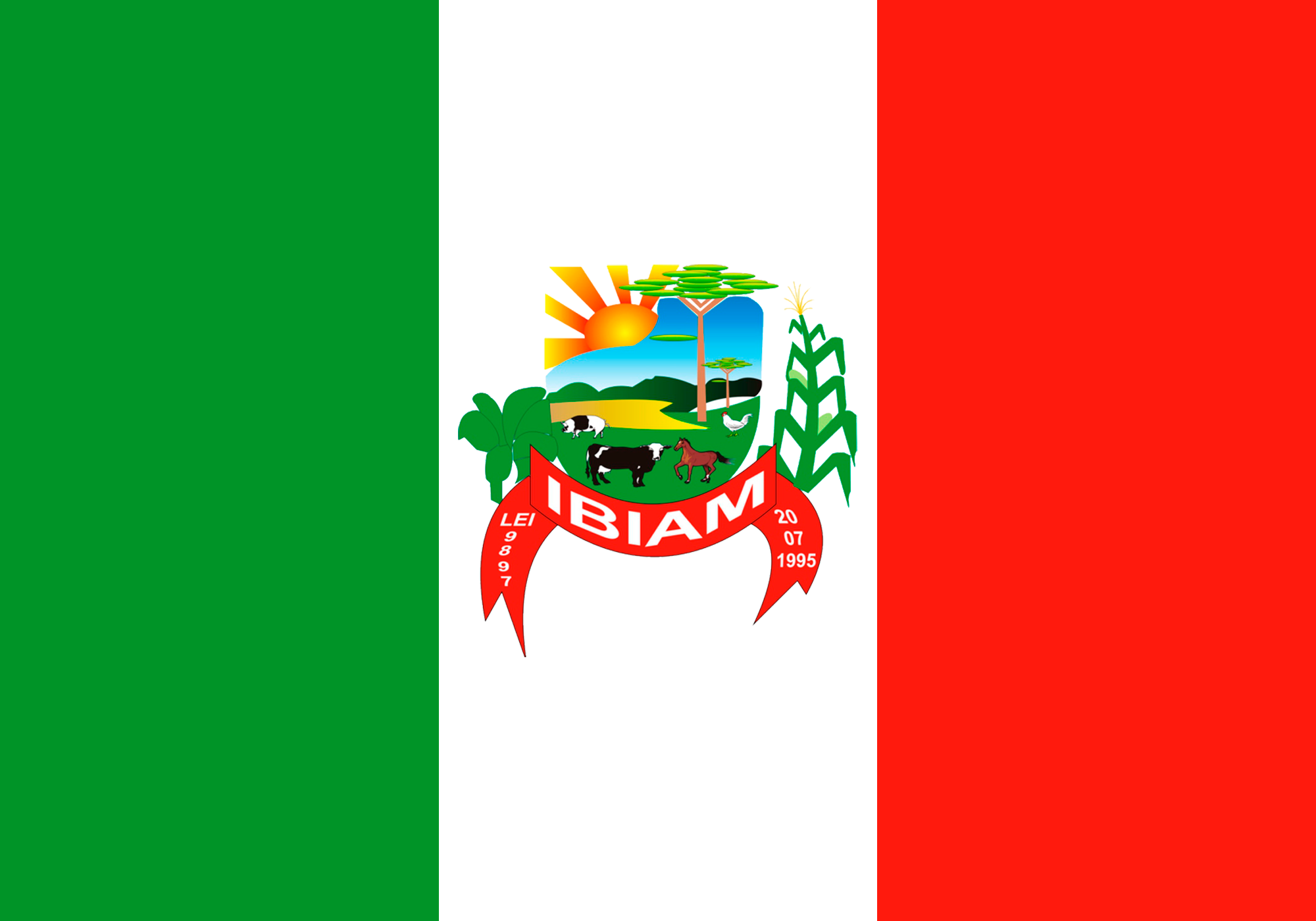
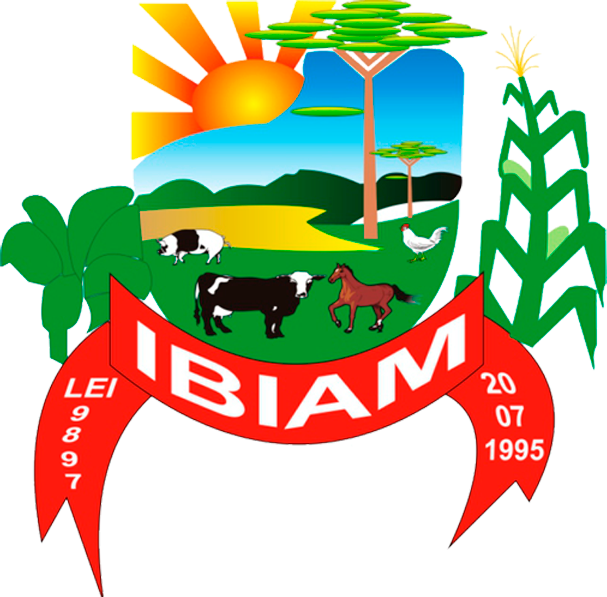
- Flag Coat of arms
- Interactive map of Ibiam
- Country: Brazil
- Region: South
- State: Santa Catarina
- Mesoregion: Oeste Catarinense

Population (2020)
  - Total: 1,954
- Time zone: UTC -3

Ibiam is a municipality in the state of Santa Catarina in the South region of Brazil.

== See also ==
- List of municipalities in Santa Catarina
