= Herval d'Oeste =

Coordinates: 27°11′38″S 51°29′42″W

Herval d’Oeste
- Municipality
- Flag Coat of arms
- Interactive map of Herval d’Oeste
- Country: Brazil
- Region: South
- State: Santa Catarina
- Mesoregion: Oeste Catarinense

Population (2020)
  - Total: 22,714
- Time zone: UTC -3
- Website: www.hervaldoeste.sc.gov.br

Herval d’Oeste is a municipality in the state of Santa Catarina in the South region of Brazil.

== See also ==
- List of municipalities in Santa Catarina
