= Lacerdópolis =

Coordinates: 27°15′S 51°34′W

- Municipality
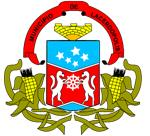
- Flag Coat of arms
- Interactive map of Lacerdópolis
- Country: Brazil
- Region: South
- State: Santa Catarina
- Mesoregion: Oeste Catarinense

Population (2020)
  - Total: 2,247
- Time zone: UTC -3

Lacerdópolis is a municipality in the state of Santa Catarina in the South region of Brazil.

== See also ==
- List of municipalities in Santa Catarina
