= Sherri Mitchell =

Native American lawyer, author, teacher and activist

- Weh’na Ha’mu Kwasset
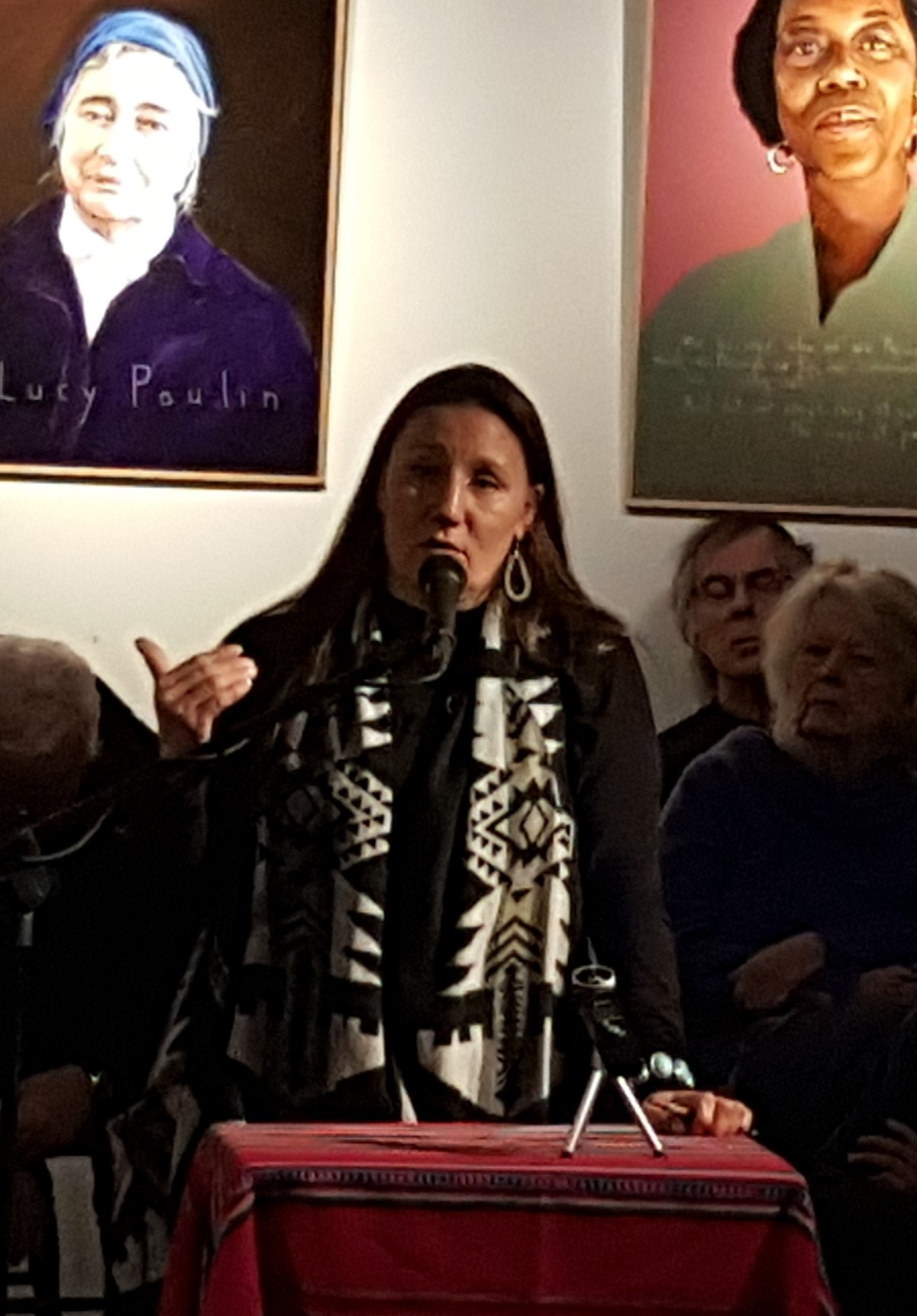
- Born: 1969 (age 56–57); Indian Island, Maine
- Education: University of Maine (BS); James E. Rogers College of Law (JD)
- Occupation: lawyer

Sherri L. Mitchell or Weh'na Ha'mu Kwasset (born 1969) is a Penobscot lawyer, author, teacher and activist from Maine. Mitchell is the author of Sacred Instructions; Indigenous Wisdom for Living Spirit-Based Change, a narrative of 'Indigenous Wisdom' that provides "a road map for the spirit and a compass of compassion for humanity."

== Early life and education ==
Mitchell grew up on the Penobscot Indian Island Reservation (Indian Island). She is the granddaughter of Theodore N. Mitchell, who founded the Native American Studies Program and the Wabanaki Center at the University of Maine. She graduated from the University of Maine magna cum laude before studying law at the University of Arizona's Indigenous Peoples Law and Policy Program led by Robert A. Williams Jr.

== Career ==
Mitchell is an alumna of the American Indian Ambassador program, and the Udall Native American Congressional Internship program. She worked as a law clerk with the United States Department of the Interior's Division of Indian Affairs in Washington, D.C. as well as with the Native American law firm Frederick Peebles Morgan in Boulder, Colorado. She was the Native American Unit Attorney for Pine Tree Legal Assistance and a Civil Rights Educator for the Maine Attorney General's Civil Rights Division. She is currently on the Board of the American Indian Institute and the Advisory Board of Nia Tero.

She is an Indigenous Rights attorney and the executive director of the Land Peace Foundation, an organization dedicated to the protection of Indigenous land and water rights and the Indigenous way of life. Mitchell has been actively involved with Indigenous rights in the U.S., Canada and abroad for more than 25 years.

Mitchell has been a longtime advisor to the American Indian Institute’s Healing the Future Program and she currently serves as a helper and advisor to the Indigenous Elders and Medicine People’s Council of North and South America. Mitchell is also the organizer of "Healing the Wounds of Turtle Island," a global healing ceremony that rises out of the Wabanaki Prophecy of Reopening of the Eastern Gate. The ceremony began in 2017 and was attended by individuals from six continents. The ceremony continues for 21 years, and will move in four year cycles until it travels to all four corners of the United States. Her work is featured in the documentary film Dancing with the Cannibal Giant by BALE (Building A Local Economy).

== Recognition ==
Mitchell was the recipient of the 2010 Mahoney Dunn International Human Rights and Humanitarian Award for research into Nation/State complicity in human rights violations against Indigenous Populations. In 2015, she received the Spirit of Maine Award for commitment and excellence in the field of International Human Rights. In 2016, Mitchell’s portrait was added to the portrait series Americans Who Tell the Truth, by artist Robert Shetterly. She is also the recipient of the 2017 Hands of Hope award from the Peace and Justice Center of Eastern Maine.

== Publications ==
- Sacred Instructions; Indigenous Wisdom for Living Spirit-Based Change, published by North Atlantic Books on March 20, 2019, also available on Audible. An excerpt from the book was published in Dawnland Voices 2.0 which is known for Indigenous writing from New England and the Northeast, on February 18, 2016.
- The Corona Transmissions: Alternatives for Engaging with Covid-19 - from the Physical to the Metaphysical (co-editor), published by Healing Arts Press in December of 2020.

=== Contributor ===
- All We Can Save: Truth, Courage, and Solutions for the Climate Crisis, published by One World Publishers in September 2020 *Resetting Our Future: Empowering Climate Action in the United States, published by Changemakers Books in February 2021
- Hearing the Waters: Indigenous oral tradition and the sacred science of sound, published by Orion Magazine in the summer of 2018
- Gatherings, Volume XII, published by Theytus Books in October 2001;
- Sense of Place, Collected Maine Poems, published by Bay River Press in June 2002.
