= ArizonaNativeNet =

Virtual university in Arizona, United States

ArizonaNativeNet is the first online virtual university designed for use by Native American communities in the United States and Native Nations around the world.

It was developed and produced by The University of Arizona through a partnership led by the Native Nations Institute at the Udall Center for Studies in Public Policy, the Native Peoples Technical Assistance Office, and the Indigenous Peoples Law and Policy Program at the University of Arizona's James E. Rogers College of Law.

The main purpose of ArizonaNativeNet is to provide Native Nations with access to the most up-to-date research, education, and distance-learning resources. The site is designed to be used by tribal leaders, policymakers, students, educators, media and the general public.

== Notable faculty ==
- S. James Anaya, James J. Lenoir Professor of Human Rights Law and Policy
- Robert A. Williams Jr., E. Thomas Sullivan Professor of Law and American Indian Studies, Director of the Indigenous Peoples Law and Policy (IPLP) Program
- Melissa L. Tatum, Research Professor of Law, Associate Director, Indigenous Peoples Law and Policy Program
