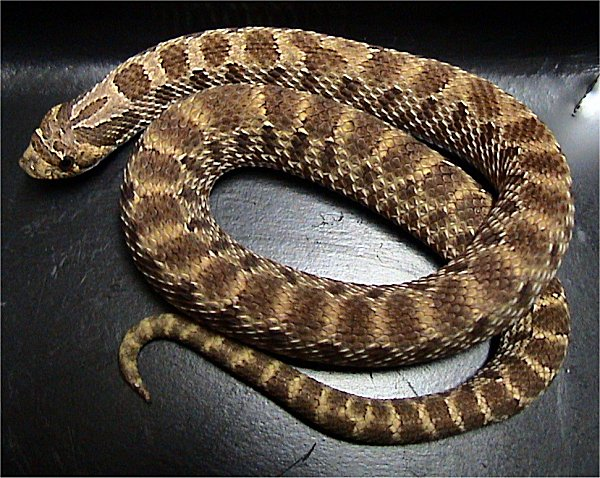
- Western hognose snake

Conservation status
- Least Concern (IUCN 3.1)

Scientific classification
- Kingdom: Animalia
- Phylum: Chordata
- Class: Reptilia
- Order: Squamata
- Suborder: Serpentes
- Family: Colubridae
- Genus: Heterodon
- Species: H. nasicus

Binomial name
- Heterodon nasicus Baird & Girard, 1852
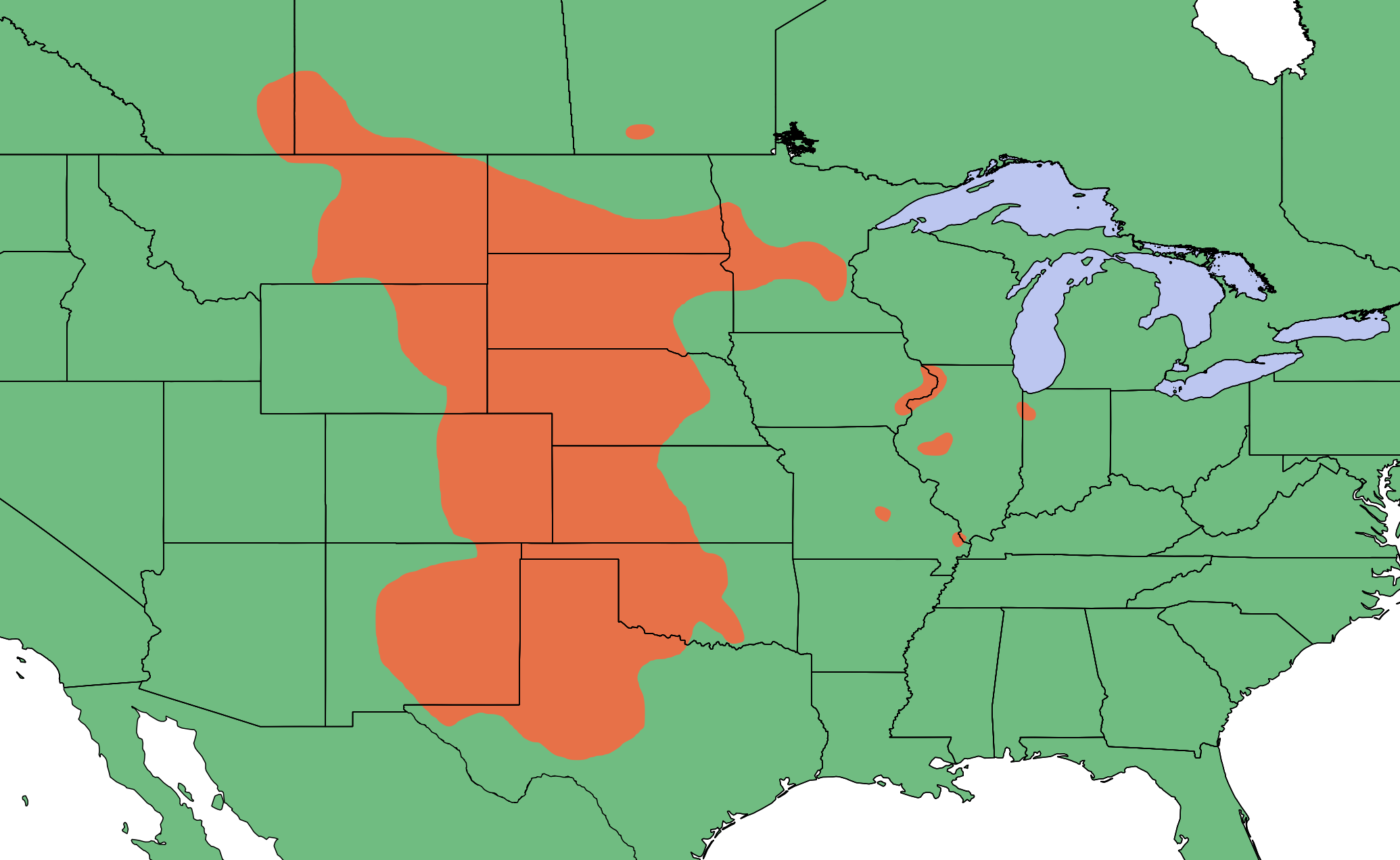

= Western hognose snake =

Species of reptile

The western hognose snake (Heterodon nasicus) is a species of snake in the family Colubridae. The species is endemic to North America. There are three subspecies that are recognized as being valid, including the nominotypical subspecies.

== Etymology ==
The specific name, nasicus, is derived from the Latin nasus ("nose"), a reference to the snake's upturned snout.

The dusky hognose's subspecific name, gloydi, is in honor of American herpetologist Howard K. Gloyd (1902–1978).

The Mexican hognose's subspecific (or specific) name, kennerlyi, is in honor of American naturalist Caleb Burwell Rowan Kennerly.

== Common names ==
Common names for Heterodon nasicus include blow snake, bluffer, plains hognose snake, prairie hognose snake, spoonbill snake, spreadhead snake, Texas hognose snake, Texas rooter, and western hognose snake.

== Taxonomy ==
Some authors elevate the subspecies Heterodon nasicus kennerlyi, also known as the Mexican hognose snake, to species level. Those same authors have subsumed H. n. gloydi into H. nasicus so that there are only two species (H. nasicus and H. kennerlyi) and no subspecies.

== Description ==
The western hognose snake is a relatively small, stout-bodied snake. Its color and pattern is highly variable between subspecies, although most specimens appear much like rattlesnakes to the untrained eye, which appears to be Batesian mimicry. Males are considerably smaller than females, with adults rarely exceeding a total length (tail included) of 40–50 cm (15–20 inches). This snake gets its common name, "hognose", from the modified rostral (nose) scale that is formed in an upturned manner, providing a very "hog-like" look. Additionally, this adaptation makes this snake an adept burrower. To add to the topic Hognose snakes also play dead when threatened.

The species is not dangerous to humans, as no deaths or systemic effects from the extremely rare bite from this rear-fanged snake have been recorded. Although bites may uncommonly be medically significant, the species is not regarded as venomous. In the capture and incapacitation of prey the modified saliva is released from Duvernoy's Glands and travels down a groove in the snake's fang.

In captivity, the species has been bred into more than 50 different "designer" color morphs.

== Distribution and habitat ==
The western hognose snake occurs from southern Canada throughout the United States to northern Mexico. It frequents areas with sandy or gravelly soils, including prairies, river floodplains, scrub and grasslands, semi-deserts, and some semiagricultural areas. It has been found at elevations of up to 2,500 m (8,200 feet).

== Ecology ==
=== Behavior ===
The western hognose snake is primarily diurnal. It is typically a docile snake (though known to be highly defensive in some individuals). If threatened (or perceiving a threat), it may flatten its neck (much like a cobra), hiss, and make 'mock' or 'bluff' strikes if harassed, which are strikes made at an intruder but with the snakes' mouth closed. Subsequently, even when further harassed, western hognose snakes virtually never bite as a self defense mechanism, but will instead usually resort to playing dead. Although it is more common that it will flatten its head, some individuals may puff up, filling the throat with air. This is more common with adolescent males. In fact if Hognose snakes are threatened they will play dead

=== Diet ===
In the wild, the western hognose snake feeds predominately on amphibians, such as large and medium-sized tree frogs, as well as small or medium-sized toads and small lizards. There have been accounts of Heterodon nasicus eating the occasional rodent in the wild as well. Not being a true constrictor, Heterodon bites and chews, driving the rear fangs into the prey as a way of introducing the saliva to help break down the toxins from toads. There have been many cases of hognose snakes in captivity that will not eat for about two to three-and-a-half months, from the months January to mid March. This is because hognose snakes' instinct is to brumate underground during the winter months.

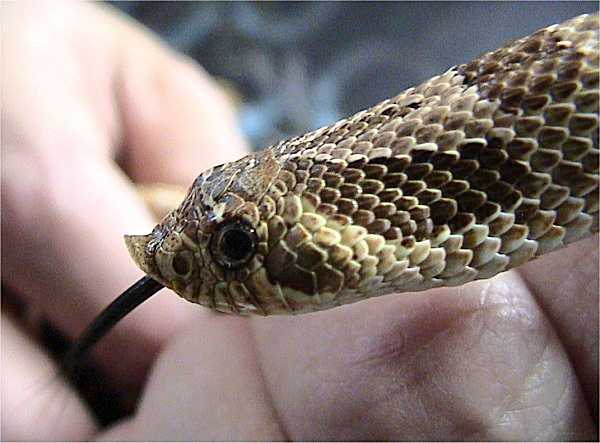
Western hognose snake specimen being held by a human

=== Reproduction ===
Adult western hognose snakes have been observed in copulation as early as February and March. The species is oviparous, with females laying 4–23 elongate, thin-shelled eggs in June–August. The eggs take approximately 60 days to hatch. Each hatchling is 13–23 cm (5–9 in) in total length, and reaches sexual maturity after approximately two years (this is predominantly based on size, not so much age).

== Predators ==
The predators of a western hognose snake are primarily Hawks, Crows, Coyotes, foxes, raccoons, opossums other larger snake species in their native habitat will eat them

Humans also pose as a huge threat to Hognose snakes by killing them out of fear and anxiety often mistaking them as a rattle snake for their stout bodies and scale patterns

== Subspecies ==
Subspecies	Authority	Common name	Geographic range
H. n. gloydi	Edgren, 1952	Gloyd's hog-nosed snake	United States: southeastern Kansas and southeastern Missouri, eastern Oklahoma and all of Texas excluding the panhandle, the Trans-Pecos and the extreme southern Rio Grande Valley.
H. n. kennerlyi	Kennicott, 1860	Mexican hog-nosed snake	Mexico from Tamaulipas and central San Luis Potosí, north and west along the Sierra Madre Occidental, entering the United States in the extreme southern Rio Grande Valley, the Trans-Pecos, southwestern New Mexico and southeastern Arizona.
H. n. nasicus	Baird & Girard, 1852	Plains hog-nosed snake	The Texas panhandle and adjacent New Mexico, north through western Oklahoma and Kansas to southwestern Manitoba and southeastern Saskatchewan in Canada. Also occurs in prairie regions of Minnesota and prairie relicts of Illinois.

== Conservation ==
Although some local declines have been reported, the species Heterodon nasicus is widespread, has a large overall population size (> 100,000), and is effectively protected by a variety of conservation programs. It is therefore currently classified as Least Concern by the IUCN. The eastern hognose snake (Heterodon platirhinos) is classified as a threatened species in some regions of its range and is therefore protected under those states' laws.
