= Emma's Revolution =

- Origin: Oakland, California, US
- Genre: Folk
- Years active: 2001–present
- Labels: Moving Forward Music, Appleseed
- Members: Pat Humphries; Sandy Opatow
- Website: www.emmasrevolution.com

Emma's Revolution is an American folk music and social justice activist duo, consisting of songwriters Pat Humphries and Sandy Opatow (a.k.a. "Sandy O"). Named after activist Emma Goldman, the group has performed at protests for peace, women's rights, labor rights, environmental protection, and other progressive causes. Their songs are also covered by various choral groups, including church choirs and labor choruses.

== History ==
Pat Humphries had a solo career as a folksinger and songwriter, recording two albums before forming Emma's Revolution with Sandy Opatow. Opatow had been part of another folk duo, Petronella, when the two met. The duo is named after the statement attributed to Emma Goldman that "If I can't dance, I don't want to be part of your revolution."

The NPR program All Things Considered devoted a feature story to the Humphries song "Swimming to the Other Side," calling it "an underground anthem." The NPR story described how, even without standard commercial success, the song became widespread and influential. Pete Seeger told NPR that "Pat's songs will be sung well into the 22nd century." Humphries would later perform "To My Old Brown Earth" on Seeger's album Seeds - The Songs Of Pete Seeger: Volume 3 Emma's Revolution later performed many times with Seeger, including at the Unitarian Universalist General Assembly in 2005, and they were chosen to deliver what The New York Times called a "fervent, heartfelt tribute" at a memorial for Pete Seeger and his wife Toshi at Lincoln Center.

Emma's Revolution has released four albums of their own music between 2009 and 2017, as well as the album "We Came to Sing," with musician and activist Holly Near. They have performed at the Parliament of the World's Religions in Salt Lake City in 2015, and have been involved with Charter for Compassion Five of their songs are anthologized in the 2016 songbook Rise Again (the sequel to Rise Up Singing).

They have composed songs for social causes including: School of the Americas Watch; Code Pink, the Refugee and Immigrant Women's Network, Black Lives Matter, the Rachel Carson Center, and the Chesapeake Climate Action Network.

== Activism ==
Emma's Revolution performed the night before Occupy D.C. began in 2011. David Montgomery of The Washington Post noted how "new movement music" such as Emma's Revolution "identifies deeper streams that seem to link disparate cultures of rebellion in the United States and other parts of the world."

Both Humphries and Opatow are featured in American artist Robert Shetterly's portrait series Americans Who Tell the Truth, which travels the country.

=== Peace ===
Emma's Revolution wrote the song "Peace, Salaam, Shalom," for a peace march in New York City following the 9/11 attacks. In the journal Music and Arts in Action, Jeneve R. Brooks of Fordham University wrote that the song was mentioned repeatedly as an effective group sing-along. "Respondents noted that the universal nature of the song's framing (i.e., appealing to peace in different languages) and its catchy and simple chorus made it a particular favorite during anti-war efforts."

=== LGBTQ ===
Emma's Revolution has recorded music reflecting on their experiences as queer women. Humphries and Opatow married unofficially in 2001, before marriage equality was legal. In an interview with Curve in 2013, Emma's Revolution talked about the "impact their music is making on changing the cultural view towards LGBT individuals." Humphries and Opatow later separated as a couple, but continue to play together as a duo.

=== #IBelieveHer ===
In 2018, in response to the United States Senate Judiciary Committee hearing for the Brett Kavanaugh Supreme Court nomination, Emma's Revolution released a song and video entitled "#IBelieveHer" in support of Christine Blasey Ford, who spoke out against Kavanaugh for allegedly sexually assaulting her 36 years prior. The song was publicized on the news program Democracy Now.

=== Unitarian-Universalism ===
Emma's Revolution has participated in many activities for the Unitarian Universalist church community. Their song "Love Reaches Out" was the official theme song of the congregation's General Assembly in 2014. Emma's Revolution songs are included in the Unitarian-Universalist Tapestries of Faith curriculum, and in the Unitarian-Universalist hymnals "Earth and Spirit Songbook," and "Las Voces del Camino."

== Awards ==
Emma's Revolution won a 2003 Grand Prize for folk music in the John Lennon Songwriting Competition for their co-written song "If I Give Your Name," about undocumented workers killed at the World Trade Center on 9/11.

In 2012, at the 27th Washington Area Music Awards ("The Wammies"), Emma's Revolution received nominations for Folk – Contemporary Duo/Group, Folk – Contemporary Recording, and Artist of the Year; and was given the 2012 Special Award for Fan Favorite.

In 2016, Emma's Revolution was given the inaugural Phil Ochs Award by the organization A Still Small Voice 4U, noticing that the group has "worked tirelessly for social and political justice giving their voices and their hands and hearts to support the environment, gay and lesbian rights, farm workers and American Indians."

== Discography ==
=== Albums ===
- One x 1,000,000 = Change a.k.a. One (2004)
- Roots, Rock and Revolution (Moving Forward Music, 2007)
- Revolutions Per Minute (Moving Forward Music, 2011)
- Revolution Now (2017)

=== Collaboration albums ===
- We Came to Sing by Holly Near with Emma's Revolution (Burnside, Calico Tracks Music, 2009)
