= Kennerly =

Kennerly is a surname and also a given name. Notable people with the surname include:

- Caleb Burwell Rowan Kennerly (1830–1861), American surgeon-naturalist
- David Hume Kennerly (born 1947), American photographer
- David Ethan Kennerly, role-playing game author
- Paul Kennerly (born 1948), English singer-songwriter, musician, and record producer
- Robert Wilson Kennerly (1931-2013), American politician and community leader
- Thomas Martin Kennerly (1874–1962), United States federal judge

Notable people with Kennerly as a first name include:

- Kennerly Kitt (born 1989), American musician, actress, and one of The Harp Twins

Alternative spellings of Kennerly exist, such as Kenerly and Kenerley. Some spell it with an "i", e.g. Kinerly. Kennerly is often confused with the surname Kennedy.

== See also ==
- Kennerley
