= Andrew Bettwy =

Andrew Bettwy may refer to:

- Andrew Jackson Bettwy (1894–1950), American politician
- Andrew Leo Bettwy (1920–2004), State Land Commissioner of Arizona, US
