= Chunk head =

Chunk head may refer to:

- Agkistrodon contortrix, a.k.a. the copperhead, a venomous pitviper found in North America
- Heterodon platirhinos, a.k.a. the eastern hog-nosed snake, a harmless colubrid found in North America
