= Arizona bajada canals =

Prehistoric water system

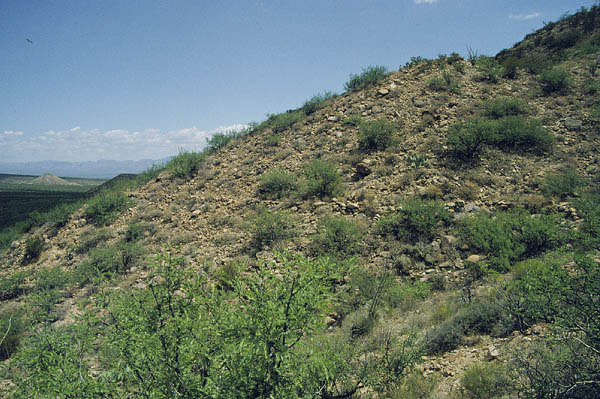
Hanging canal (middleground) flowing from right to left along the west side of the long and narrow mesa landform near the mouth of Marijilda Canyon. At this point, the canal is about 50 meters above the western basin. The canal coursing upslope illusion is discernible.

Prehistoric Bajada "hanging" canals of southeastern Arizona were constructed after c. 1250 and remained in use until c. 1450.

The presence of irrigation and domestic water supply canals in the bajada of the Pinaleño Mountains of Safford Basin expands the knowledge of prehistoric water management and agricultural intensification in the American Southwest. In contrast to the lowland riverine floodplain canals, such as those of the Hohokam culture in the Phoenix Basin, an extensive network of canal systems exists in the undulating piedmont landscape of southeastern Arizona. These canal systems are seen as an adaptive technology to mitigate the arid topography and climate, and greatly expand the settlement and agricultural potential of the area.

== Scope and extent ==
This apparently unique series of late classic prehistoric mountain stream fed water management structures have been recently rediscovered in the Safford Basin of Arizona's upper Gila Valley. At least 28 hanging canal systems or fragments have been identified to date. The longest canals are about 9.5 kilometers (ca. 6 miles) and the total length of all systems is currently estimated to exceed 80 kilometers (ca. 50 miles) While a few of these canals may date as early as c. 800, the vast majority appear to have originated after c. 1250 and persisted until c. 1450.

== Reasons for the hanging structures ==
Portions of these canal systems are literally "hung" on the edges of steep sided, gently sloping mesas formed from remnant Quaternary age bajadas. The canals appear to be distinct from those found in the vicinity of Phoenix and elsewhere in the Southwest in that they obtained their water from mountain drainages fed by runoff, springs, and artesian sources, rather than from rivers. They are also unusual in that they traverse the vertically undulating to severely erratic uplands of basin and range topography rather than being restricted to a nearly level riverine floodplain. At places, the hanging structures are as much as 60 meters above their adjacent drainage basins. It appears the highest feasible locations on mesas were carefully selected for canal routes. It also seems clear that extreme energy efficiency was a major goal during the canal construction. Two credible reasons for these unique hanging routes is that their slope could be made largely independent of their surrounding terrain. And that much of the construction effort could be efficiently made across, rather than along the canal routes. Thus minimizing any energy loss or water robbing cuts and fills.

Canal cross-sections vary from 0.30 to one meter, with atypical examples up to two meters in width, and 20 to 40 centimeters in depth. Their use seems to be primarily long distance water delivery to fields, but a few of these canals are bordered by prehistoric habitation sites and well-defined agricultural fields.

== Proof of age ==
When assisted by historic rebuilds, several reaches of the canals still flow to this day. Portions of most of the systems remain largely pristine, and many are currently filled with fine grained sediments. These systems are located mostly on Arizona State and Coronado National Forest lands that remain largely undeveloped. While often of difficult access, major canal portions are usually easily traced. There are few access roads and fewer mesa top trails.

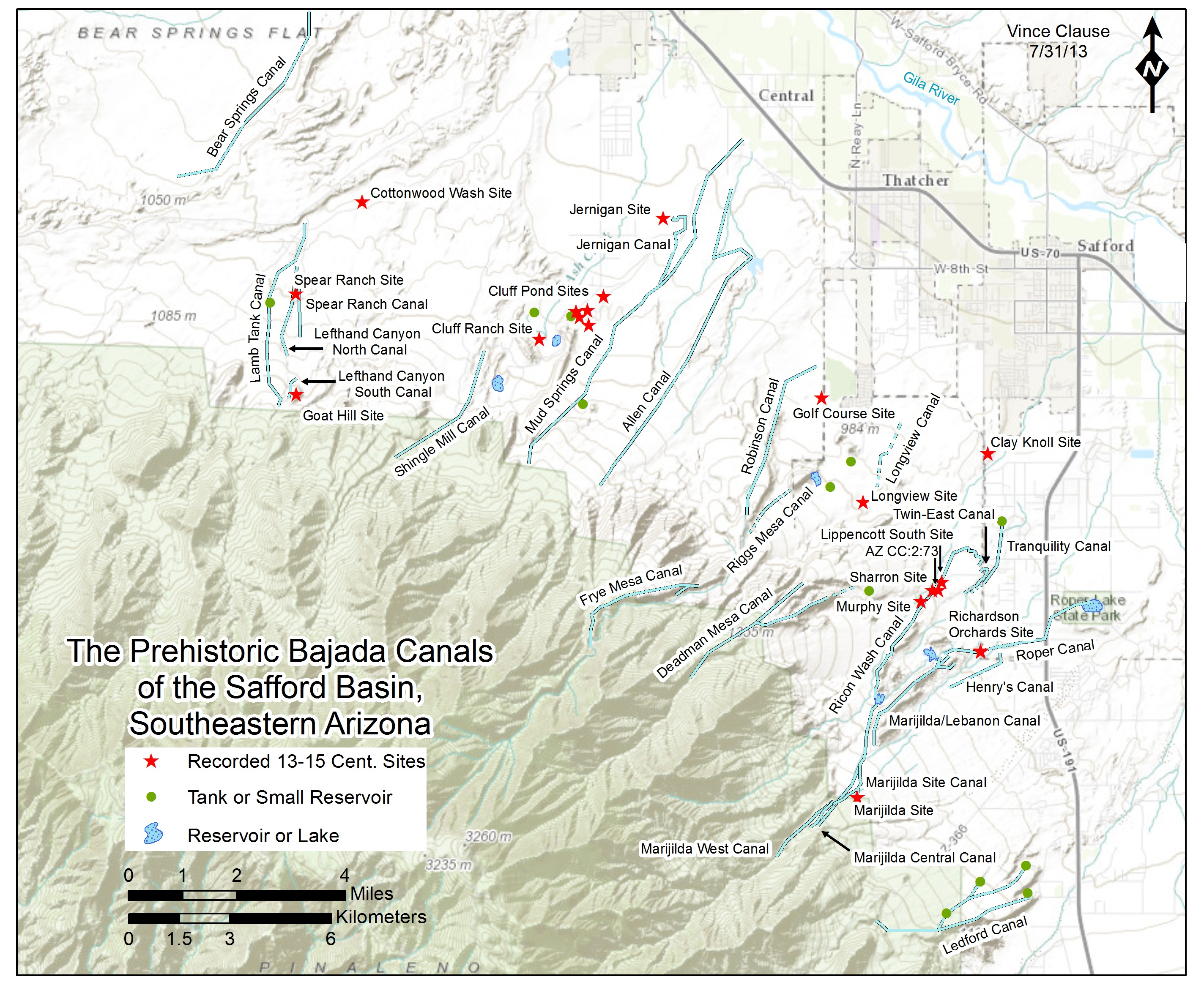
Locations of the bajada drainage sourced hanging canals recorded to date.

While the canals have been dated mostly by stratigraphy and association, other age evidence does include: being run over by roads, SCS dams, and even cemeteries roughshod without accommodation; uniform patina, lichens, and caliche; mature trees and shrubs mid-channel; extreme purposefulness and well-directed energy efficiency; and a lack of apparent use of pioneer or CCC tools except in places of obvious refurb or adaptation.

== Population density ==
Surveys in Lefthand Canyon and Marijilda Canyon have recorded a rather heavy population concentrated along the canals, but the sites are nearly all small and scattered. Survey along many of the other canals recorded only a few small sites. These findings provide evidence in the form of agricultural intensification and settlement that points to a socio-political organization based on the collaboration and collective action of small corporate groups rather than a more complex social stratification and socio-political structure. Such findings parallel those reported in the Hohokam area.

== Trading partners ==
Ceramics and house remains from contemporary habitation sites indicate both trading activity as well as residence by several of the prehistoric cultural groups of the Southwest. Besides the Mimbres, Mogollon, Salado, and Ancestral Puebloans, the Hohokam master canal builders of the Phoenix area are clearly included.

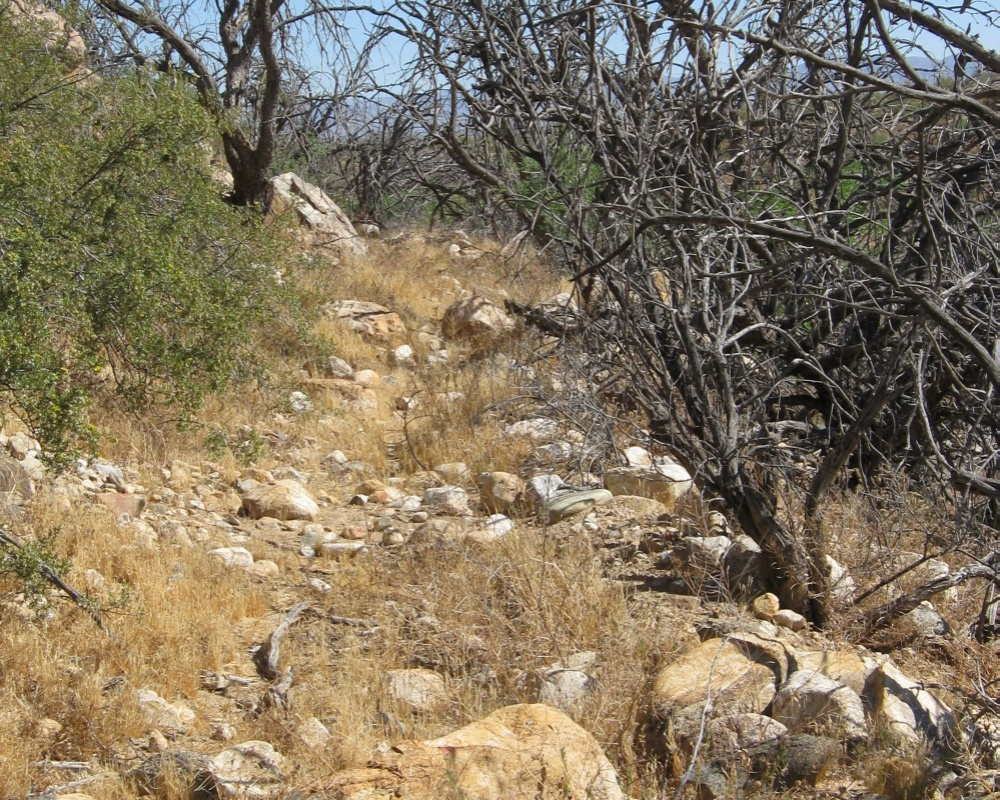
Looking down the canal at the narrow, nearly completely filled channel of the Robinson Canal as it routes along the steep side of a mesa on its way to fields on Robinson Flat. Note the illusion of the canal coursing upslope.

While it is likely that some of the canals were engineered and constructed by the local inhabitants of the Safford Basin, the Hohokam presence does suggest that Hohokam migrants may have at least in part assisted in engineering the later more sophisticated canal constructions.

== Associated water management structures ==
The hanging canals are found in an area where other older and contemporaneous water management schemes are also present. These include conventional lowland riverine canals, extensive dry farming terraced and grid fields, numerous check dams, some of which are aproned, single room field houses, and grouped arrays of mulch rings and rock piles. No survey instruments are known to survive, but it is possible that pilot extensions of the canals themselves served as static water levels.

The construction effort is variously believed to be fifty man years or more. Portions of the system give a rather strong "water flowing uphill" illusion, owing to the controlled gentle slopes and the nature of the adjacent terrain. Additional associated structures include a long aqueduct crossing a saddle, a deep and long cut, and an upcanyon routed "counterflow" canal segment.

== See also ==
- Acequia
- Aqueduct (water supply)
- Flume
- Leat
- Levada
