= Andrew Jackson Bettwy =

American politician (1894–1950)

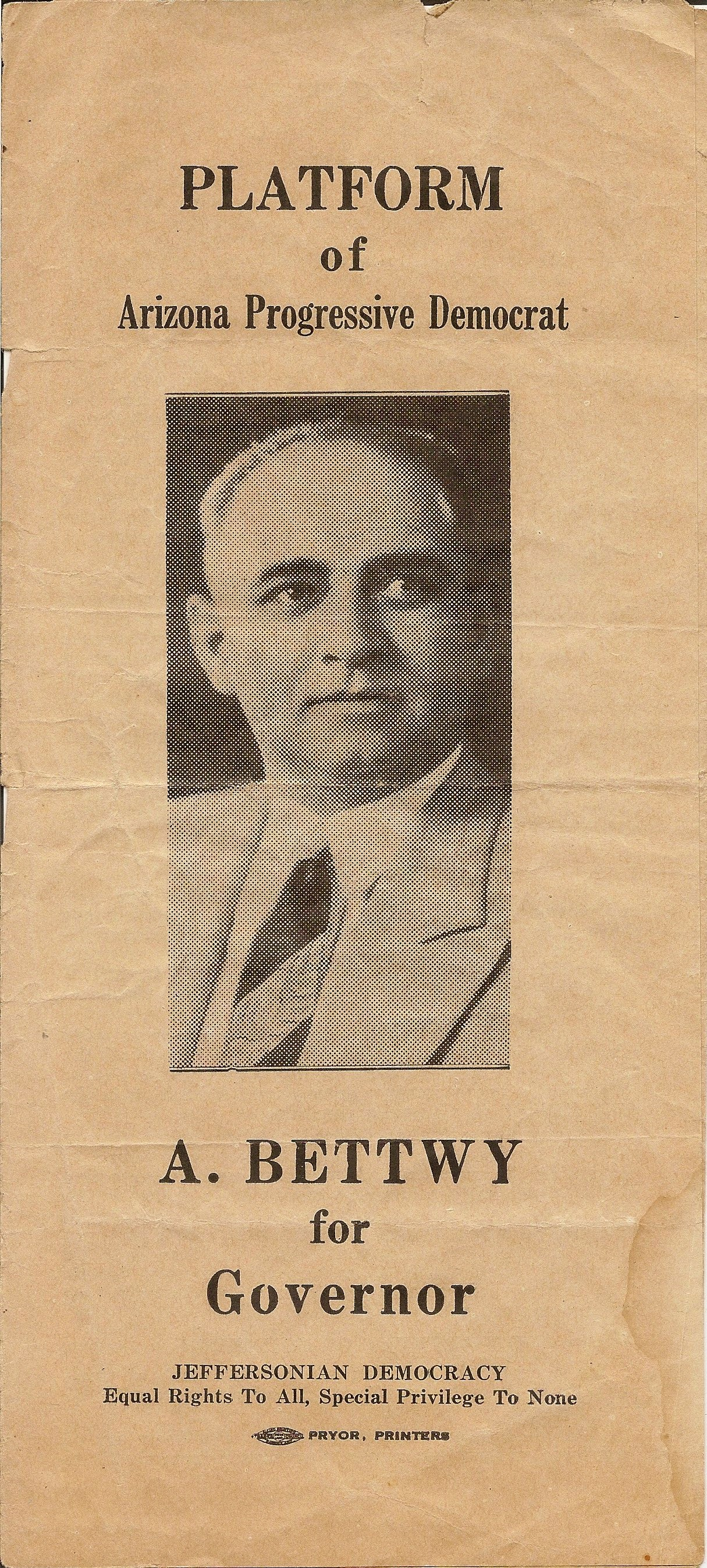
- 1938 gubernatorial campaign brochure

18th Mayor of Nogales, Arizona
- In office 1935–1937

Arizona State Senator
- In office 1926–1930
- Constituency: Santa Cruz County

Personal details
- Born: September 24, 1894 Altoona, Pennsylvania
- Died: October 29, 1950 (aged 56) Little Rock, Arkansas
- Education: University of Arizona

Andrew Jackson Bettwy (September 24, 1894 – October 29, 1950), an Arizona Democrat, served as Mayor of Nogales, Arizona, from 1935 to 1937, was an Arizona delegate at the Democratic National Conventions of 1924 and 1928, and 1928, and was an unsuccessful candidate for governor in the 1930, 1932, 1934, 1936, and 1938 primary elections and in the 1932 general election.

Arizona 1930 primary gubernatorial election candidates

== Political life ==
Although affable, Bettwy was a controversial firebrand as mayor of Nogales, and he is most remembered in Arizona folklore for flattening William Mathews, the publisher of the Arizona Daily Star, during Mathews' anti-Roosevelt New Deal speech at the 1936 Arizona State Democratic Convention in Tucson, Arizona.

His wife Mary Bettwy was also a well-liked Arizona politician, which was a notable achievement for her during the 1930s when the effects of the Nineteenth Amendment were still only burgeoning. When Andrew was Mayor of Nogales from 1935 to 1937, his wife Mary was President of the Nogales Young Democrats Club, an affiliate of Young Democrats of America, which was founded in 1932 to further the election campaign of presidential nominee Franklin D. Roosevelt.

In the 1938 elections, he ran unsuccessfully for Arizona state governor, and she ran successfully for Santa Cruz County Recorder to become the first Hispanic female elected to public office in the State of Arizona. After winning the seat in 1938, she surprised everyone, including political leaders, by immediately appointing her rival as her chief deputy. Her unprecedented political move was reported in newspapers nationwide, from California to Texas to Pennsylvania to New York to Florida. As the Pittsburgh Post-Gazette reported: "A political precedent unlikely to bring even a ripple of emulation despite its apparent benefit to the public is that set by Mrs. Mary Bettwy, Democratic recorder-elect of Nogales, Arizona, who has amazed the staunch partisans of her own and the Republican party there by appointing her Republican campaign opponent, Mrs. Ada Jones, as her deputy. . . That great wave of cheering that you do not hear is undoubtedly from the leaders of the Democratic organization in Nogales as the dazed Republican chiefs and the public pinch themselves to find out whether or not they are awake."

They divorced during their campaigns, however, and he later moved to Prescott to retire from politics. Mary Bettwy stayed in Nogales and was reelected five times to serve as County Recorder for 21 years until her death in 1960. As a popular candidate, she was "one of the top vote-getters each election year in the county."

== Family, education and military service ==
Bettwy was the son of André Bettwy (1867–1951) and Mary Billand (1863–1939), natives of Alsace who immigrated to the United States and settled in Altoona, Pennsylvania. Bettwy had two sons, Andrew Leo Bettwy (1920–2004), Arizona State Land Commissioner (1970–1978) and William Frederick Bettwy (1918–2005) of Pine Bluff, Arkansas, the first commercial pilot to land at Washington Dulles Airport. His grandson was Andrew Wilson Bettwy, the second Chief Hearing Officer of the Arizona Corporation Commission (1975–1979) and renowned utility rate legal expert in Arizona, Nevada and California.

Bettwy was in the first class of the University of Arizona law school (the James E. Rogers College of Law) when it opened in 1915, but he interrupted his studies to join the U.S. Army. From 1916 to 1919, he participated in the Pancho Villa Expedition, including the Battle of Ambos Nogales, which was dedicated to the pursuit of Pancho Villa along the border. While stationed in Nogales, he met his bride-to-be, Mary Chenoweth Escalante, and they had their first son William in 1918. Bettwy served until the end of World War I after which he received an honorable discharge. He re-joined the U.S. Army as a commissioned officer during World War II and retired as a Lieutenant Colonel in 1947. Bettwy and his wife Mary divorced in 1938, and she was County Recorder of Santa Cruz County for 21 years, until 1960. Bettwy moved to Prescott, Arizona, and eventually settled in Little Rock, Arkansas, where he was laid to rest.
