= Arizona Journal of Environmental Law and Policy =

Arizona Journal of Environmental Law & Policy
- Discipline: Environmental law
- Language: English

Publication details
- History: 2010-Present
- Publisher: University of Arizona College of Law
- Frequency: Biannually

Standard abbreviations
- Bluebook: Ariz. J. Envtl. L. & Pol'y
- ISO 4: Ariz. J. Environ. Law Policy

Links
- Journal homepage

The Arizona Journal of Environmental Law and Policy is a biannual student-run open access law journal covering environmental issues from legal, scientific, economic, and public policy perspectives. It was established in 2010 and was originally sponsored by the Udall Center for Studies in Public Policy (University of Arizona). It is now published by the University of Arizona College of Law.

== Impact ==
In 2017, Washington and Lee University's Law Journal Rankings placed the journal 14th out of 81 environmental, natural resources, and land use law journals for Impact-Factor. Articles published in the journal have been cited by the Arizona Court of Appeals. Articles published in the journal have also been cited by many other legal treatises and journals, including American Jurisprudence, Law of Independent Power, Rogers' Hornbook on Environmental Law (Second Edition), Virginia Law Review, UCLA Law Review, George Washington Law Review, and Southern California Law Review.
