= Andrew Leo Bettwy =

Arizona government official (1920–2004)

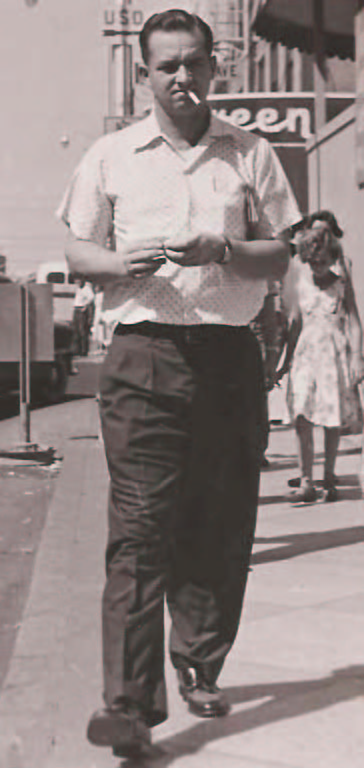

Land Commissioner State of Arizona
- In office 1970–1978

Personal details
- Born: May 31, 1920 Nogales, Arizona
- Died: December 1, 2004 (aged 84) San Diego, California
- Education: University of Arizona

Andrew Leo Bettwy (May 31, 1920 – January 12, 2004), a Republican, served as Arizona State Land Commissioner from 1970 to 1978 under four Arizona governors.

== Career as State Land Commissioner ==
Because of Bettwy's widely recognized expertise and knowledge of Arizona's public lands and because of his reputation for integrity and impartiality, Governor Jack Richard Williams appointed him State Land Commissioner in 1970 to become the steward of Arizona's trust lands. Although the position was a political appointment, Bettwy served for the next nine years under four governors (Jack Williams, Raul Hector Castro, Wesley Bolin and Bruce Babbitt). Bettwy was keenly aware of the value of every acre of the land that he managed, so he was never fooled by the attempts of developers and politicians who would propose trades for land of lesser value. In spite of constant political pressure to sell the trust lands, Bettwy stood firm by his view that the primary beneficiaries of the trust (public schools) were best served by holding on to the land (because it is an appreciating asset) and maximizing its income.

In 1978, Governor Babbitt fired Bettwy because they disagreed over the best way to implement land management policies. Because of Bettwy's concern for the public trust, Bettwy spoke frankly to newspaper reporters after he was fired which unleashed a vicious campaign of untruths that took aim at Bettwy's greatest asset, his reputation for integrity. Despite the power of Bettwy's attackers, the only newspaper that agreed to assist them was the Arizona Daily Star which had not forgotten that Bettwy's father, Andrew Jackson Bettwy, had flattened its former publisher William Mathews during his anti-Roosevelt New Deal speech at the 1936 Arizona State Democratic Convention in Tucson, Arizona. In response to the attacks that were published in the Star, Bettwy himself asked for an Arizona Senate investigation which disproved all of the untruths and commended him for his exemplary management of Arizona's trust lands.

== Family, education and military service ==
Andrew Leo Bettwy was the son of Mary Bettwy née Maria Jesus Laura Chenoweth Escalante (County Recorder of Santa Cruz County, Arizona, for 21 years) and Andrew Jackson Bettwy (Mayor of Nogales, Arizona, and State Senator). Bettwy was born and raised on Pete Kitchen's Ranch in Nogales, attended college and law school at the University of Arizona, and settled in Phoenix, Arizona. He had one brother, William Frederick Bettwy (1918–2005) of Pine Bluff, Arkansas, the first commercial pilot to land at Washington Dulles Airport.

Against his mother's insistence that he stay in Nogales to work on the family ranch after his graduation from Nogales High School in 1938, Bettwy joined the U.S. Army and then received a four-year military scholarship to the University of Arizona. In his senior year (1943–44), he met his wife-to-be, Janice Kathryn Kennerly (1925–2000) (Janice's brother is Robert Wilson Kennerly, well-known Arizona politician and community leader). His studies were interrupted by the war in Europe where he served as an armored car commander in a reconnaissance squadron during the push from Calais to Berchtesgaden, earning two battle stars and a Purple Heart. 1LT Bettwy participated in the liberation of the German concentration camp at Landsberg, and during the final three days of the war in Europe in May 1945, was officially "traded" to the German 38th SS Division Nibelungen as liaison officer to effect orderly surrenders. He was then dispatched to the Pacific Theater of Operations, but Japan surrendered in August 1945, when he was en route.

Bettwy then completed college and law school on the G.I. Bill and got his start with the Phoenix firm of Page & Company, which specialized in public lands. Bettwy did not particularly enjoy the practice of law, but he loved Arizona and knew its history and every inch of its territory, having traveled it many times over with his father. On vacations with his own family, Bettwy could not resist detours along old highways and backroads, often unmaintained and treacherous.

Bettwy and his wife Janice Kathryn Kennerly had three children, all of whom became lawyers: Andrew Wilson Bettwy (1944–2011), Samuel Bettwy of San Diego, California, and Maria Wolfinger Bettwy of Phoenix, Arizona.

Bettwy died on December 1, 2004.

== Mexican ancestry ==
Bettwy was a Mexican citizen by birth (doble nacionalidad). His mother, Mary Bettwy née Maria Jesus Laura Chenoweth Escalante, was born in Mexico, and his grandmother, Laura Escalante Chenoweth (1875–1968), was a native of Hermosillo, Sonora, Mexico. Laura's father, Vicente Escalante, was Mayor of Hermosillo, and her brother-in-law (through her sister Amparo Escalante) was Ramón Corral who served in several public offices in Mexico, including the governor of Sonora and vice president of the republic with President Porfirio Díaz from 1904 to 1911.

Although Laura and her husband William Fitzwilliam Chenoweth lived in Nogales, Arizona, she insisted on giving birth to Andrew's mother Mary in Mexico to ensure that Mary and her children would be Mexican citizens. Bettwy and his brother William were therefore Mexican citizens by birth. Mary Bettwy was the first Hispanic female to be elected to office in the State of Arizona (County Recorder of Santa Cruz County). Bettwy was born and raised in Nogales, Arizona, and spoke fluent Spanish. In the late 1950s, he moved his entire family from Arizona to Mexico City where he practiced law as an associate for the law firm of Goodrich Riquelme y Asociados, A.C. His children (Andrew, Samuel and Maria) were therefore raised in Mexico City and then later in Phoenix, Arizona. Bettwy's son Samuel is a California lawyer-advocate for immigration reform that includes the elimination of visa quotas for Mexicans, and his daughter Maria is an immigration lawyer currently [as of when?] practicing in Phoenix, Arizona.
