= Melissa L. Tatum =

American law professor

- Other name: Melissa L. Koehn

Academic background
- Education: Trinity University (BA); University of Michigan Law School (JD)

Academic work
- Discipline: Law
- Sub-discipline: Federal Indian law; Tribal law; Domestic violence law
- Institutions: University of Arizona College of Law; University of Tulsa College of Law

Melissa L. Tatum is research professor of law and former director of the Indigenous Peoples Law and Policy Program at the University of Arizona's James E. Rogers College of Law. She previously served as professor of law and co-director of the Native American Law Center at the University of Tulsa College of Law.

== Education and work ==
Tatum earned her B.A. from Trinity University in Texas in 1989 and her J.D. from the University of Michigan Law School in 1992. She teaches and writes in the areas of Federal Indian law, tribal law, jurisdiction, and cultural property.

Tatum has written and lectured extensively about cross-jurisdictional enforcement of protections orders, and is considered one of the leading national experts in the field, particularly with respect to tribal courts. She has served as a consultant to the New Mexico Attorney General's Office's Task Force on Best Practices for Enforcing Protection Orders (2007–2009) and to a Michigan Working Group on Full Faith and Credit for Protection Orders (2000–2001) organized by the Michigan Domestic Violence Prevention and Treatment Board.

Tatum has taught workshops across the country for judges, attorneys, victims services agencies and law enforcement officers on that topic. Her article, "A Jurisdictional Quandary", is cited by the National Congress of American Indians' Fact Sheet on Violence Against Women in Indian Country, and the State of Montana's publication "Full Faith and Credit: Encourage to Arrest." Her articles "Tribal Efforts To Comply with VAWA’s Full Faith and Credit Requirements" (co-authored with Sarah Deer) and "Law Enforcement Authority in Indian Country" are listed as resources by the Tribal Court Clearinghouse; her article "Establishing Penalties for Violating Protection Orders" is cited as a resource by the National Center on Domestic and Sexual Violence. All four articles are also listed as resources by tribalprotectionorder.org. Tatum is also the co-author of a Model Tribal Code for Enforcement of Protection Orders.

Tatum works extensively with tribal courts and has developed a method for indexing, digesting, and publishing tribal court opinions. She served as the general editor for the Mvskoke Law Reporter, an eight-volume set containing the court opinions of the Muscogee (Creek) Nation from 1832–present, and as the editor for volume 8 of the Navajo Reporter, as well as the second editions of volumes 1 and 2 of the Navajo Reporter. Tatum served as a member of the Navajo Nation's Rules Harmonization Project, co-authoring a report on Navajo Nation Proceedings and Outside Review. She sat as a judge on the Southwest Intertribal Court of Appeals from 1999 to 2006.

While at the University of Tulsa, Tatum was an administrator for the LLM program in American Indian and Indigenous Law, one of three such programs in the United States. As Associate Director of the University of Arizona's Indigenous Peoples Law and Policy Program (IPLP), Tatum oversees IPLP's graduate law programs, which include an LLM program, as well as the only SJD program in the United States in the field of Indian and Indigenous law. Tatum has also served as a faculty member for the National Tribal Judicial Center (part of the National Judicial College) on several occasions, and has taught at the American Indian Law Center's Pre-Law Summer Institute, as well as at Wayne State University Law School, Michigan State University College of Law, and the University of Detroit Mercy School of Law.

She was a contributor to The Rountree Report, a blog and podcast tracking news and events relating to the Indigenous Peoples Law and Policy Program, and the blog For the Seventh Generation (news, views, and opinions federal Indian law and tribal governance by law professors who teach in the field).

== Publications ==
- Tatum, Melissa L. (2007). "Tribal Courts: Tensions Between Efforts to Develop Tribal Common Law and Pressures to Harmonize with State and Federal Courts". In Backer, Larry Catá (ed.). Harmonizing Law in an Era of Globalization: Convergence, Divergence, and Resistance. Carolina Academic Press. ISBN 978-0-89089-585-6.
- Tatum, Melissa L.; Grunsted, Michelle, eds. (2006). Mvskoke Law Reporter: The decisions of the Muscogee (Creek) Nation. Vol. 1–8. OWC Press.
- Tatum, Melissa L., ed. (2008) [1979]. Navajo Reporter. Vol. 8 (2nd ed.). Tulsa, OK: OWC Press. LCCN 79115378. OCLC 5673362.
- Tatum, Melissa L., ed. (2009) [1979]. Navajo Reporter. Vol. 1–2 (2nd ed.). Tulsa, OK: OWC Press. LCCN 79115378. OCLC 5673362.
- Bucholtz, Barbara Kay; Frey, Martin A.; Tatum, Melissa L. (2002). The Little Black Book: A Do-it-yourself Guide for Law Student Competitions. Carolina Academic Press. ISBN 978-0-89089-512-2.
- Newton, Nell Jessup, ed. (2005) [1945]. Cohen's Handbook of Federal Indian Law. LexisNexis. ISBN 0327164441. LCCN 2005021550.
- Deer, Sarah; Tatum, Melissa (2003). "Tribal Efforts to Comply with VAWA's Full Faith and Credit Requirements: A Response to Sandra Schmieder". Tulsa Law Review. 39 (2): 403–418.
- Tatum, Melissa (2004). "Law Enforcement Authority in Indian Country". Tribal Law Journal. 4 (1).
- Tatum, Melissa L. (2003). "Establishing Penalties for Violations of Protection Orders: What Tribal Governments Need to Know". Kansas Journal of Law & Public Policy. 13: 125.
- Tatum, Melissa L. (2001–2002). "A Jurisdictional Quandary: Challenges Facing Tribal Governments in Implementing the Full Faith and Credit Provisions of the Violence against Women Acts". Kentucky Law Journal. 90: 123–227.
- Tatum, Melissa L. (2000). "Group Identity: Changing the Outsider's Perspective". George Mason University Civil Rights Law Journal. 10: 357.
- Koehn, Melissa L. (1998). "The New American Caste System: The Supreme Court and Discrimination among Civil Rights Plaintiffs". University of Michigan Journal of Law Reform. 32: 49.
- Koehn, Melissa L. (1997). "Civil Jurisdiction: The Boundaries between Federal and Tribal Courts". Arizona State Law Journal. 29: 705.
- Tatum, Melissa L. (2001). "Symposium: Native American Law--Foreword". Tulsa Law Review. 37 (2): 481.
