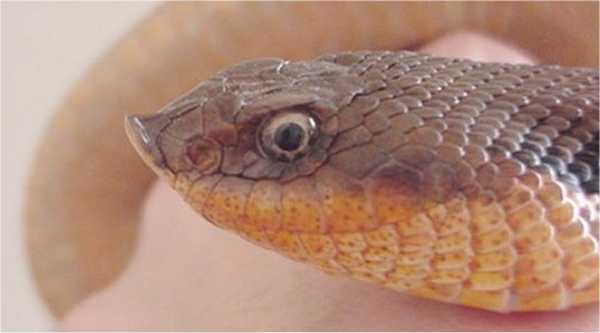
- Eastern hognose snake (H. platirhinos)

Scientific classification
- Kingdom: Animalia
- Phylum: Chordata
- Class: Reptilia
- Order: Squamata
- Suborder: Serpentes
- Family: Colubridae
- Subfamily: Dipsadinae
- Genus: Heterodon; Latreille in Sonnini & Latreille, 1801

= Heterodon =

Genus of snakes

Heterodon is a genus of harmless colubrid snakes endemic to North America. They are stout with upturned snouts and are perhaps best known for their characteristic threat displays. Three species are currently recognized. Members of the genus are commonly known as hognose snakes, hog-nosed snakes, North American hog-nosed snakes, and colloquially puff adders (though they should not be confused with the venomous African vipers of the genus Bitis).

== Description ==
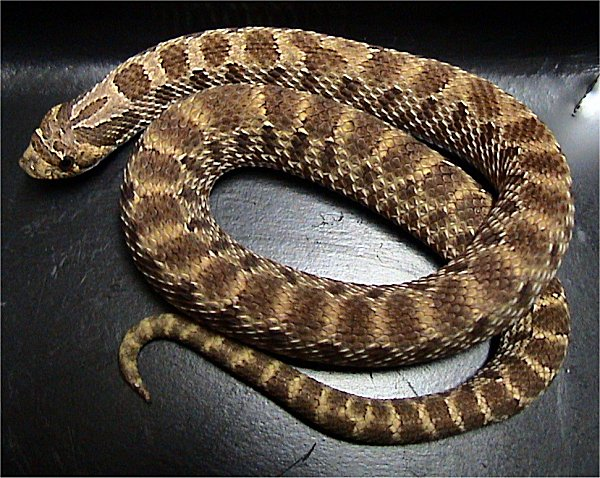
Western hog-nosed snake (H. nasicus)

Adults grow to 30–120 cm (12–47 in) in total length. The body is stout and the head is slightly distinct from the neck. The latter is expandable, the anterior ribs being capable of spreading to flatten that portion of the body, similar to a cobra. The tail is short and the anal scale divided. The dorsal scales are keeled with apical pits in 23-25 rows. The rostral scale is projecting, upturned, recurved and keeled dorsally. There are usually 1-20 accessory scales (azygous) that separate the internasals and the prefrontals. A subocular ring is present with 8-12 ocular scales. There are 7-8 upper labials and 9-13 lower labials. The ventrals number 114–152 and the subcaudals 27–60.

The color pattern is extremely variable. H. nasicus tends to be sandy-colored with black and white markings, while H. platirhinos varies from reds, greens, oranges, browns, to black depending on locality. They are sometimes blotched and sometimes solid-colored.

Members of this genus have enlarged rear maxillary teeth, two on each side, and possess a slightly toxic saliva. In a few cases involving bites from H. nasicus, the symptoms reported have ranged from none at all to mild tingling, swelling and itchy skin. Nevertheless, they are generally considered to be harmless to humans.

Hognose snakes' most distinguishing characteristic is their upturned snout, which is believed to aid in digging in sandy soils.

== Behavior ==
When threatened, the hognose snake flattens its neck and raises its head off the ground, similar to a cobra, and hisses. It may sometimes feign strikes, but is extremely reluctant to bite. This behavior has earned the hognose snake several nicknames, such as "blowing adder", "flathead", "spreading adder", or "hissing adder". If this threat display does not work to deter a would-be predator, the hognose snake often rolls onto its back and plays dead with its mouth open and tongue lolling, going as far as to emit a foul musk from the cloaca. Emission of cloacal musk is considerably less likely than in many other species. If the snake is rolled upright while in this state, it often rolls over again as if to insist that it is really dead.

Unfortunately due to their appearance and impressive defensive display, hognose snakes are commonly mistaken to be copperheads and subsequently killed. This is especially true in the southeastern regions of the United States, where copperheads are especially prevalent by comparison to other areas it shares with the hognose.

== Feeding ==
Hognose snakes live chiefly on toads and can neutralize that animal’s poisonous skin secretions physiologically.

== Captivity ==
Hognose snakes are frequently found in the exotic pet trade. H. nasicus are often considered to be the easiest to care for, and captive-bred stock is easily found. H. platirhinos is commonly found, but their dietary requirements can be a challenge for some keepers.

== Species ==
Species	Authority	Subsp.*	Common name	Geographic range
H. kennerlyi	Kennicott, 1860	0	Mexican hognose snake	Southern Texas into northern Mexico. Sometimes considered a subspecies of H. nasicus
H. nasicus	Baird & Girard, 1852	2 (sometimes elevated to species status, based on two scale characters)	Western hognose snake	Southeastern Alberta and southwestern Manitoba in Canada, south to southeastern Arizona and Texas in the United States. Disjunct populations in Minnesota, Wisconsin, Iowa, Illinois, Missouri and Arkansas.
H. platirhinos	Latreille, 1801	0	Eastern hognose snake	United States: eastern-central Minnesota to extreme southern New Hampshire, south to southern Florida and west to eastern Texas and western Kansas.
H. simus	(Linnaeus, 1766)	0	Southern hognose snake	United States: from the coastal plains in southeast North Carolina, south to Lake Okeechobee in Florida and west to southeastern Mississippi.

* Not including the nominate subspecies
