= Brent T. Adams =

American judge (1948–2022)

Brent Thomas Adams

Judge, Second Judicial District, Reno, Nevada, Appointed 1989 and subsequently elected four times
- In office July 4, 1989 – August 1, 2014
- Appointed by: Governor Bob Miller

Personal details
- Born: June 3, 1948 Las Vegas, Nevada
- Died: November 1, 2022 (aged 74) Reno, Nevada
- Education: Northern Arizona University (1972); University of Arizona College of Law (J.D. 1974)

Brent Thomas Adams (June 3, 1948 – November 2, 2022) was an American judge in Nevada's Second Judicial District, located in Reno, Washoe County, Nevada. He served for 25 years, eventually becoming Chief Judge of that court. He innovated with the creation and development of a drug court, created a forum for early case resolution, created and chaired a Criminal Justice Advisory Committee, served as the District Court's first business court judge and continuing to serve as a business court judge until his retirement over 10 years later.

== Early life and education ==
Adams was born in Las Vegas, Nevada, on June 3, 1948. He attended Las Vegas High School. For two years, Adams was a Nevada state high school debate champion. He was one of two Nevada high school students selected to participate at Northwestern University's National High School Institute. He was on championship high school debate teams in Nevada and in national competitions.

In 1972, Adams received his undergraduate degree, with honors, from Northern Arizona University. Adams was a Frances I. Borozon scholar in philosophy and English at Northern Arizona University. While at Northern Arizona, he was "elected President of the Associated Students by the largest majority in the history of the university." He was also "a member of the collegiate debate team, [placing] first in speech and debate events throughout the Southwest. He led the winning team in the National Discussion Contest sponsored by Bradley University."

== Legal career ==
=== Lawyer ===
Adams received his Juris Doctor degree from the University of Arizona College of Law in 1974. He was an assistant federal public defender for five years, and was in private legal practice in Reno for 17 years.

=== Judicial service ===
On July 4, 1989, after being nominated through a merit selection process, Governor Bob Miller appointed Adams as a judge for Nevada's Second Judicial District Court, a state level trial court located in Reno, Washoe County, Nevada. He was subsequently elected to that position four times. Adams eventually became Chief Judge of the Second Judicial District Court. Under his leadership, that court "pioneered creation of the Washoe County Drug Court, the Early Case Resolution Program, Bench-Bar Committee, Pretrial Services Department, court house security program, the Criminal Justice Advisory Committee, and the renovation and relocation of the Washoe County Law Library." He was chairman of the Washoe County Criminal Justice Advisory Committee from 1992 to 2002.

In 2000, Nevada's Supreme Court created a specialized business court track in the Second Judicial District, known as the Business Court. Adams was the first presiding judge in the Washoe County Business Court. He continued to serve as a business court judge until his retirement 14 years later. As a business court judge, Adams was an advocate of active and early case management as a means of controlling the expense and duration of litigation, which in turn would promote the long-term financial health of the companies in litigation.

Adams was chosen to sit by designation in some cases before Nevada's Supreme Court.

=== Educator ===
As an educator, for over 20 years Adams was a "core" faculty member of the National Judicial College teaching other judges evidence, trial tactics, legal ethics, and settlement techniques. "At least twice yearly he taught trial and appellate judges from across the nation in settlement conference techniques, complex case management, judicial discretion, professional ethics and evidence. He was also active in international in-country judicial education jointly funded by the National Judicial College and the United States Agency for International Development. He taught judges in Moscow, Siberia, Kazakhstan, Tajikistan and Columbia. He was chosen by the Ninth Circuit Judicial Conference to conduct educational seminars in Guam for trial judges of territories in the Pacific Islands."

=== Author ===
Adams was editor-in-chief of the Nevada Civil Practice Manual.

== Journalism ==
While still an undergraduate, during the summers, he became a reporter for the Las Vegas Review-Journal. Adams received the Charles E. Murray Award from the Nevada State Press Association for Outstanding Reporter of the Year.

== Political activity ==
Adams served as chairman of the Nevada State Democratic Party from 1982 to 1984. In 2006, he requested of Nevada's Supreme Court that judges and judicial candidates be barred "from personally soliciting or accepting campaign contributions."

== Awards and honors ==
He was named Judge of the Year by the Northern Nevada Alumni Association of the University of the Pacific McGeorge School of Law. Governor Brian Sandoval formally proclaimed the day of Adams' retirement, August 1, 2014, as a "day in honor of BRENT ADAMS". From 1994 until his retirement, the attorneys in the Washoe County Bar Association gave him "stellar ratings" as a judge. He received the Charles E. Murray Award from the Nevada State Press Association for Outstanding Reporter of the Year.

== Death ==
Adams died on November 2, 2022, at the age of 74.
