= Kennerley =

Kennerley is a surname. Notable people with the surname include:

- Alfred Kennerley (1810–1897), Australian politician, Premier of Tasmania 1873–76
- Kerri-Anne Kennerley (born 1953), Australian light entertainment host
- Kevin Kennerley (born 1954), English footballer
- Mitchell Kennerley (1878–1950), English-born American publisher
- Paul Kennerley (born 1948), English singer-songwriter, musician and record producer

== See also ==
- Kennerly
