= Robert A. Williams Jr. =

American lawyer

Robert A. Williams Jr. is an American lawyer, author, and legal scholar. He works in the fields of federal Indian law, international law, indigenous peoples' rights, critical race and post-colonial theory. Williams teaches at the University of Arizona's James E. Rogers College of Law, serving as Regents Professor, E. Thomas Sullivan Professor of Law and Faculty Chair of the Indigenous Peoples Law and Policy Program.

== Family ==
Williams is the son of Robert Anthony Williams Sr. and Sallie Williams. He has a wife and two children, Sam and Marley. He has a sister named Karen Amanda Cooper (née Williams) who has four children: Zac, Andrew, K.C., and Ben Cooper.

== Career ==
Now at University of Arizona James E. Rogers College of Law, Williams has established a notable career in the fields of American Indian and International law, indigenous people's rights, and critical race and colonial theory. He has published several books on these topics.

For the 2003-2004 academic year, Williams was named the first Oneida Indian Nation Visiting Professor of Law at Harvard Law School. He previously taught there as the Bennet Boskey Distinguished Visiting Lecturer of Law.

Williams served as Chief Justice for the Court of Appeals, Pascua Yaqui Indian Reservation. He also served as Justice for the Court of Appeals and trial judge pro tem for the Tohono O'odham Nation.

Williams has represented tribal groups before the Inter-American Court of Human Rights, the Inter-American Commission on Human Rights, and the United Nations Working Group on Indigenous Peoples. He served as co-counsel for Floyd Hicks in the United States Supreme Court case, Nevada v. Hicks 533 U.S. 353 (2001).

== Awards and honors ==
Williams has received awards from the John D. and Catherine T. MacArthur Foundation, the Soros Foundation Open Society Institute, the National Endowment for the Humanities, the American Council of Learned Societies, and the National Institute of Justice in recognition of his research and advocacy on behalf of Indian tribes and indigenous peoples.

- 1990 Annual Gustavus Meyers Human Rights Center Award, for outstanding book on the subject of prejudice in the United States - The American Indian in Western Legal Thought: The Discourses of Conquest)

== Selected works ==
- Williams, Robert A. (1990). The American Indian in Western Legal Thought: The Discourses of Conquest. Oxford University Press. ISBN 0-19-505022-3.
- Williams, Robert A. (1997). Linking Arms Together: American Indian Treaty Visions of Law and Peace, 1600-1800. Oxford University Press. ISBN 0-19-506591-3.
- Williams, Robert A.; Getches, David; Wilkinson, Charles (2004). Federal Indian Law: Cases and Materials (5th ed.). West. ISBN 0-314-02268-6.
- Williams, Robert A. (2005). Like a Loaded Weapon: The Rehnquist Court, Indian Rights and the Legal History of Racism in America. University of Minnesota Press. ISBN 0-8166-4709-7. Archived from the original on 2011-07-08.
- Williams, Robert A. (2012). Savage Anxieties: The Invention of Western Civilization (1st ed.). New York: Palgrave Macmillan. ISBN 978-0-230-33876-0.
