= Heterodon kennerlyi =

Scientific classification
- Kingdom: Animalia
- Phylum: Chordata
- Class: Reptilia
- Order: Squamata
- Suborder: Serpentes
- Family: Colubridae
- Genus: Heterodon
- Species: H. kennerlyi

Binomial name
- Heterodon kennerlyi Kennicott, 1860
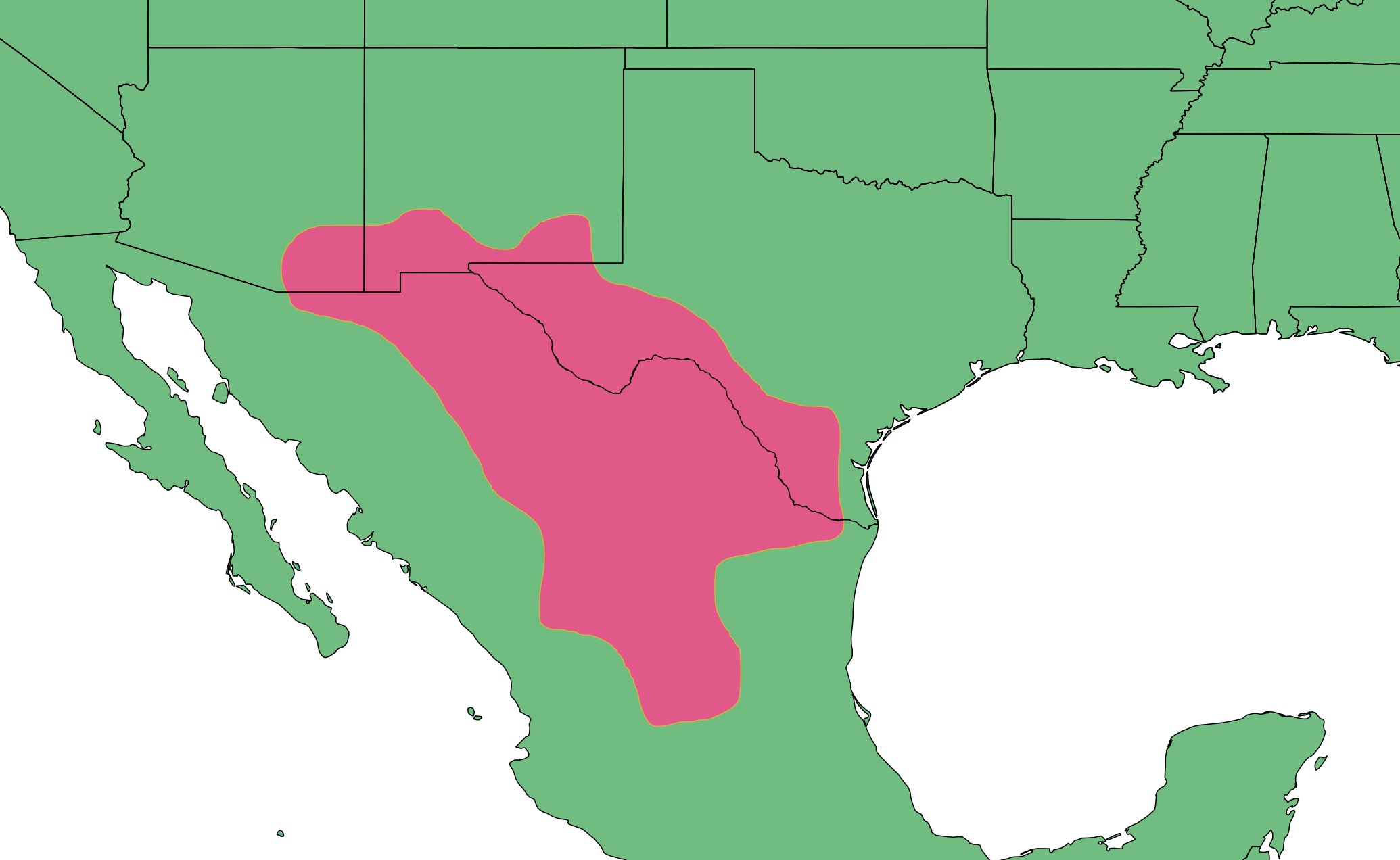

Synonyms
- Heterodon kennerlyi Kennicott, 1860; Heterodon nasicus var. kennerlyi — Jan, 1865; Heterodon simus var. kennerlyi — Garman, 1884; Heterodon nasicus kennerlyi — Cope, 1900; Heterodon kennerlyi — H.M. Smith et al., 2003

Species of snake

Heterodon kennerlyi, also known commonly as the Mexican hognose snake, Kennerly's hog-nosed snake, and la trompa de cerdo mexicana in Mexican Spanish, is a species of snake in the subfamily Dipsadinae of the family Colubridae. The species is native to the southwestern United States and adjacent northeastern Mexico

== Etymology ==
The specific name, kennerlyi, is in honor of Caleb Burwell Rowan Kennerly, who was an American physician and naturalist.

== Description ==
H. kennerlyi has 2–6 small azygous scales behind the rostral. Adults usually have a snout-to-vent length (SVL) of 15–25 in (38–64 cm). The maximum recorded SVL is 29.9 in (76 cm).

== Geographic range ==
In the United States H. kennerlyi is found in southern Arizona, southern New Mexico, and southwestern Texas. In Mexico it is found in the Mexican states of Aguascalientes, Chihuahua, Coahuila, Durango, Jalisco, Nuevo León, San Luis Potosí, Sonora, Tamaulipas, and Zacatecas.

== Reproduction ==
H. kennerlyi is oviparous.
