= Arizona State Land Department =

State agency

Department overview
- Formed: 20 May 1912; 114 years ago (as Arizona State Land Commission)
- Jurisdiction: Arizona public lands
- Department executive: Robyn Sahid, Land Commissioner
- Website: land.az.gov

The Arizona State Land Department is a department of the state government in the U.S. state of Arizona dedicated to the management of state-owned lands and property.

== Mission statement ==
The mission statement of the Arizona State Land Department is to manage state trust lands and resources to enhance value and optimize economic return for the trust beneficiaries, consistent with sound stewardship, conservation, and business management principles supporting socioeconomic goals for citizens here today and generations yet to come. The mission is also to manage and provide support for resource conservation programs for the well-being of the public and the state's natural environment. The State Land Department is managed by the State Land Commissioner who is appointed by the Governor.

== History ==
Land Grant & Designation of Beneficiaries

The Territory of Arizona was established on February 24, 1863, by an Act of Congress. This Act granted sections 16 and 36 of each township for the benefit of the Common Schools. Endowment of public lands for educational purposes was a practice established by the Northwest Ordinance in 1787. Congress quickly recognized the value of the land and the importance of public schools to a developing nation. The State Enabling Act, passed on June 20, 1910, allowed the Territory of Arizona to prepare for statehood. In addition to the previously designated sections of land, the Enabling Act assigned sections 2 and 32 of each township to be held in trust for the Common Schools. The needs of other public institutions were considered by Congress, and through the Enabling Act, more than two million additional acres were allocated for their use.

In addition, a 1929 Act authorized an additional 50,000 acres for the Miners’ Hospital Trust. An 1881 Act had already granted the Territory of Arizona about 60,000 acres for the University of Arizona Trust. The total acreage was about 10,900,000. Today, State Trust Land is apportioned among 14 beneficiaries.

Creation of State Land Department

On May 20, 1912, an act of the First Legislature created the three-member State Land Commission to serve as the temporary Land Department of the State. The members were Mulford Winsor, Chairman; Cy Byrne, Secretary; and William A. Moody, member. Appointed by Governor George W. P. Hunt, they were charged with assessing, evaluating, and making recommendations about the land granted by Congress to the State for the Common Schools and other institutions. The commission was to report back to the Legislature with its findings and conclusions by the end of the second Legislative session.

The Commission concluded that Arizona should not sell its Trust land outright, as other states had done. Instead, it should put the lands to their "highest and best use." The decision to sell or lease the land should be based upon the potential use of each parcel. The Commission recommended the creation of a permanent State Land Department "...in order that the multitudinous detail attached to the State’s varied land interests may have constant attention and to prevent irretrievable loss."

The State Land Department and the system by which Trust lands were to be managed were established in 1915 by the State Land Code. In compliance with the Enabling Act and the State Constitution, the State Land Code gave the Department authority over all Trust lands and the natural products from these Trust lands.

Since the State Land Department's inception, its missions have been to manage the Land Trust and to maximize its revenues for the beneficiaries. All uses of the land must benefit the Trust, a fact that distinguishes it from the way public land, such as parks or national forests, may be used. While public use of Trust land is not prohibited, it is regulated to ensure protection of the land and reimbursement to the beneficiaries for its use.

Methods of Land Acquisition

Arizona has acquired lands in four types of transactions.

School Sections in Place
As land surveys were completed by the Federal government, title to four school sections in each township–Sections 2, 16, 32, and 36–automatically passed to the State.
Indemnity in Lieu Selections
When school section lands were not available to the State because they had been previously claimed by homesteaders or miners or because they fell within a Federal reservation or a national forest, park, or Indian reservation, the State was given the right to select an equal acreage of Federal public domain land as indemnity in lieu of the school sections the State should have received.
Quantity Grant Selections
The State selected the specified acreage of Federal lands for the County Bonds and each of the individual institutional Trusts.Land Exchanges
After acquiring title to the Trust lands, the State traded many of the lands for other Federal or private lands of equal value in order to relocate and block up Trust land holdings.
The State acquired its School Sections in Place wherever the land surveys placed them. The State chose the lands acquired in the Indemnity in Lieu Selections, Quantity Grant Selections, and Land Exchange processes.
These choices were made by the State Selection Board, which consists of the Governor, State Attorney General, and State Land Commissioner. The Land Commissioner in recent years has been replaced on the Board by the State Treasurer. Most of the selections were made in the 1915–1960 era, with the selection program being finally completed in 1982. Since the State was precluded by Federal laws from acquiring mineral lands, and since the homesteaders had already acquired most of the potential agricultural lands, the State focused on choosing the best grazing lands.
Most of the acreage chosen during the 1915–1960 era was in central and southeastern Arizona, and in the checkerboard land area along the railroad across north-central Arizona. As agriculture developed in Arizona, later selections were made in irrigated areas in the Harquahala Valley and the Gila River Valley. The final selections concentrated on commercial and agricultural lands along the Colorado River.
Land exchanges in the 1935–1985 era relocated most of the school section lands out of the western deserts and into areas close to Phoenix and Tucson and into better grazing lands in such areas as western Yavapai County.

== Location and uses of state trust land ==
Most of Arizona trust lands are currently [as of when?] used only for livestock grazing purposes. Several hundred thousand acres of these grazing lands have become urban lands as Phoenix, Tucson, and other cities and towns have expanded. The Urban Lands Act, passed in 1981, enabled the trust to capitalize on the large increase that planning and zoning adds to raw land values. Today [as of when?] the Land Department's urban lands lease and sale program is the largest revenue producer for the trust.

Nearly all of the most valuable urban Trust lands around the northern border of the Phoenix metropolitan area and north and west Tucson are Common Schools Trust lands. The large block of Trust lands on the south and southeast sides of the Tucson metropolitan area is divided amongst the various institutional trusts. The University of Arizona Trust owns a large amount of timbered land acreage in the Flagstaff area and agricultural lands near Yuma. However, the majority of the acreage in the other individual institutional trusts are rural grazing lands, although some agricultural potential exists.

In the years since statehood in 1912, the state has disposed of, or exchanged, about 1,628,079 acres of trust lands. A total of 9,228,787 acres of trust land remains [as of when?]. Almost all of the lands are under one or more leases for natural resource uses and commercial development purposes. About 87 percent of the trust lands are in the Common School Trust and approximately 90 percent of the trust revenues go to that trust.

== Issues and reform efforts ==
Since 1990, there have been 11 measures on the ballot to change how state lands are managed and numerous reform attempts in the legislature. These efforts have produced little real change. Proposed reform measures included making it easier to exchange lands with the federal government, funding the State Land Department from revenues earned, improved protection of natural resources, To improve the revenues from land sales to urban developers, some have recommended that the State Land Department be allowed to issue bonds or enter into partnerships with developers.

In 1998, the Arizona Preserve Initiative fostered the preservation of open space around urban areas through the reclassification of State Trust Land for conservation purposes. The Initiative was later discontinued due to threat of lawsuit.

The State Land Commission allowed a Saudi company, Fondomonte, to pump unlimited groundwater from its land in the Butler Valley at no charge under the administration of Governor Doug Ducey. Butler Valley was set aside for future ground water delivery to urban areas via the Central Arizona Project canal. The Fondomonte lease has been criticized as substantially below-market. Katie Hobbs raised the issue during her campaign and terminated the lease of the 3,520 acres (1,420 ha) in Butler Valley after she was elected governor.

== Arizona State Land Commissioners ==
- W.A. Moer 1915–1920
- Rudolph Kuchler 1921–1922
- Vernon Vaughn 1923–1928
- Don C. Babbitt 1928–1929
- Howard J. Smith 1931–1934
- Charles P. Mullen 1934–1937
- William P. Alberts 1937–1941
- O.C. Williams 1941–1949
- W.W. Lane 1949–1953
- Rodger Ernst 1953–1957
- Obed M. Lassen 1957–1970
- Andrew L. Bettwy 1970–1978
- Joe T. Fallini 1978–1982
- Robert K. Lane 1983–1987
- M. Jean Hassell 1987–1997
- J. Dennis Wells 1997–1999
- Michael E. Anable 1999–2003
- Mark Winkleman 2003–2009
- Maria Baier 2009–2012
- Vanessa P. Hickman 2012–2015
- Lisa A. Atkins 2015–2023
- Robyn Sahid (Executive Director - not AZ Senate confirmed) 2023–Present
