= Robert Wilson Kennerly =

American politician in Arizona (1931–2013)

Chairman Yuma County Board of Supervisors
- In office 1976–1984

Councilman Yuma City Council
- In office 1962–1966

Personal details
- Born: February 13, 1931 Detroit, Michigan, U.S.
- Died: August 20, 2013 (aged 82) Yuma, Arizona, U.S.

Robert Wilson Kennerly (February 13, 1931 – August 20, 2013) was an American politician and a community leader in Yuma, Arizona. He served on the Yuma City Council from 1962 to 1966, as Chairman of the Yuma County Board of Supervisors from 1976 to 1984, and on the Arizona Board of Pardons and Parole from 1984 to 1989.

== Political life: 1958–1989 ==
In 1958, Kennerly entered Arizona politics by running for Precinct Committeeman in Phoenix's 31st District. He was elected and served a full term, becoming active in community organizations. In 1962, he was elected to the Yuma City Council, and in 1966 he ran unsuccessfully for reelection. For the next ten years, he served actively on the District 4 Council of Governments. In 1976, Kennerly was elected as a Democrat to the Board of Supervisors in Yuma County's District 1, which is a very diverse socio-economic district, and he was reelected in 1980, serving as Chairman during both terms. In 1984, Governor Babbitt appointed him to the Arizona Board of Pardons and Parole where he served until 1989. Kennerly also served on the Commission on Appellate and Supreme Court Appointments for the State of Arizona and as Self-Governance Coordinator/Planner and Director of Gaming for the Cocopah Indian Tribe, instrumental in the development of an 18-hole golf course, a 500-unit RV park, a bingo hall, and a casino.

== Community leader ==
As a community leader, Kennerly was one of the founders of the Southern Arizona Bank of Yuma, and he served on the Board of the Yuma County Chamber of Commerce. He was the first President of Caballeros de Yuma and served as the Publicity Director for the Yuma Chapter of the NAACP of which he is a lifetime member. He was also a charter member and President of both the Sunrise Optimist Club and the Fort Yuma Rotary Club, Board member of the Yuma Golf and Country Club, and founder, charter President and long-time Board member of the Yuma Boys Club.

== Personal life and death ==
Robert Wilson Kennerly was the son of Samuel Wilson Kennerly of Harrington, Delaware, and Margaret Claire Kelly of North Attleborough, Massachusetts. In 1946, he moved to Arizona where, in 1948, he married Jeannette Wade. Together, they had four daughters, Robin, Kathryn, Carol and Bunny.

Robert Wilson Kennerly died in Yuma on August 20, 2013, at the age of 82.
