= Robert Shetterly =

American artist (born 1946)

- Born: 1946 (age 79–80); Cincinnati, Ohio
- Education: Harvard University
- Notable work: Americans Who Tell the Truth
- Partner: Gail Page

Robert Shetterly (born 1946) is an American artist, best known for his portrait series, "Americans Who Tell the Truth".

== Americans Who Tell the Truth ==
The project begun in response to U.S. government actions following the September 11, 2001 attacks on the World Trade Center towers in New York City. Shetterly undertook the project as a way to deal with his own grief and anger by painting Americans who inspired him. He initially intended to paint only 50 portraits, but by 2022 more than 260 portraits were included in the series. Portions of the series tour widely across the United States, being shown in schools, museums, libraries, galleries and other public spaces.

A book titled Americans Who Tell the Truth, written and illustrated by Shetterly, was published by Dutton Children's Books in 2005. It was reviewed favorably by Kirkus. It won the International Reading Association's Intermediate—Nonfiction award for 2006, and the nonprofit Children's Book Council listed it among the "2006 Notable Social Studies Trade Books for Young People," saying it is "sure to inspire debate and further research.".

== Personal life ==
Shetterly lives with his partner, Gail Page, in Brooksville, Maine.

== Publications ==
- Portraits of Racial Justice: Americans Who Tell the Truth, New York, NY; New Village Press, 2021.
- Portraits of Earth Justice: Americans Who Tell the Truth, New York, NY; New Village Press, 2022.
- Portraits of Peacemakers: Americans Who Tell the Truth, New York, NY; New Village Press, 2024.
