= Caleb B. R. Kennerly =

American physician and naturalist

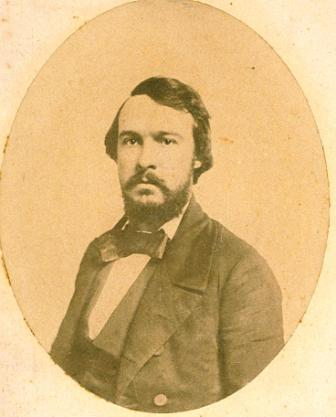

Caleb Burwell Rowan Kennerly (2 March 1830 – 6 February 1861) was an American medical doctor and naturalist who worked with the Smithsonian Institution and served on the Pacific Railroad Survey as a surgeon-naturalist.

Kennerly was born in White Post, Virginia, to Reverend Thomas Kennerly and Ann Susan Carnegy. He went to Dickinson College, Carlisle, Pennsylvania, and graduated in 1849. He became interested in ornithology after joining field outings with Professor Spencer Fullerton Baird. He went to study medicine and graduated MD from the University of Pennsylvania in 1852. On the recommendation of Baird, he served as a surgeon-naturalist on the northwest boundary survey under Major Amiel Weeks Whipple from 1855 to 1857 and with Archibald Campbell in 1858. In 1861 he boarded a ship from San Francisco to return to Virginia to get formally married to Cecelia Chanique whom he had married in a tribal ceremony during the northwest boundary survey. Four days later he died at sea from a brain haemorrhage and was buried at sea. A cenotaph was built in White Post, Virginia, by his family. Kennerly collected numerous specimens and kept notes on his travels which are now held in the Smithsonian Institution.

Kennerly is commemorated in the scientific name of a species of Mexican snake, Heterodon kennerlyi.
