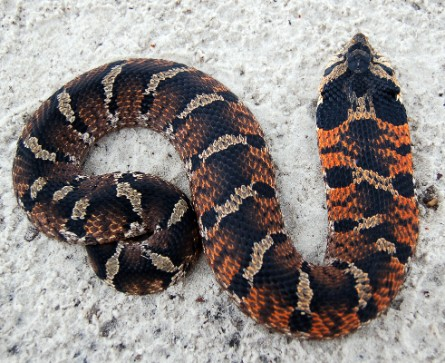
- Southern Georgia morph

Conservation status
- Least Concern (IUCN 3.1)

Scientific classification
- Kingdom: Animalia
- Phylum: Chordata
- Class: Reptilia
- Order: Squamata
- Suborder: Serpentes
- Family: Colubridae
- Genus: Heterodon
- Species: H. platirhinos

Binomial name
- Heterodon platirhinos Latreille, 1801
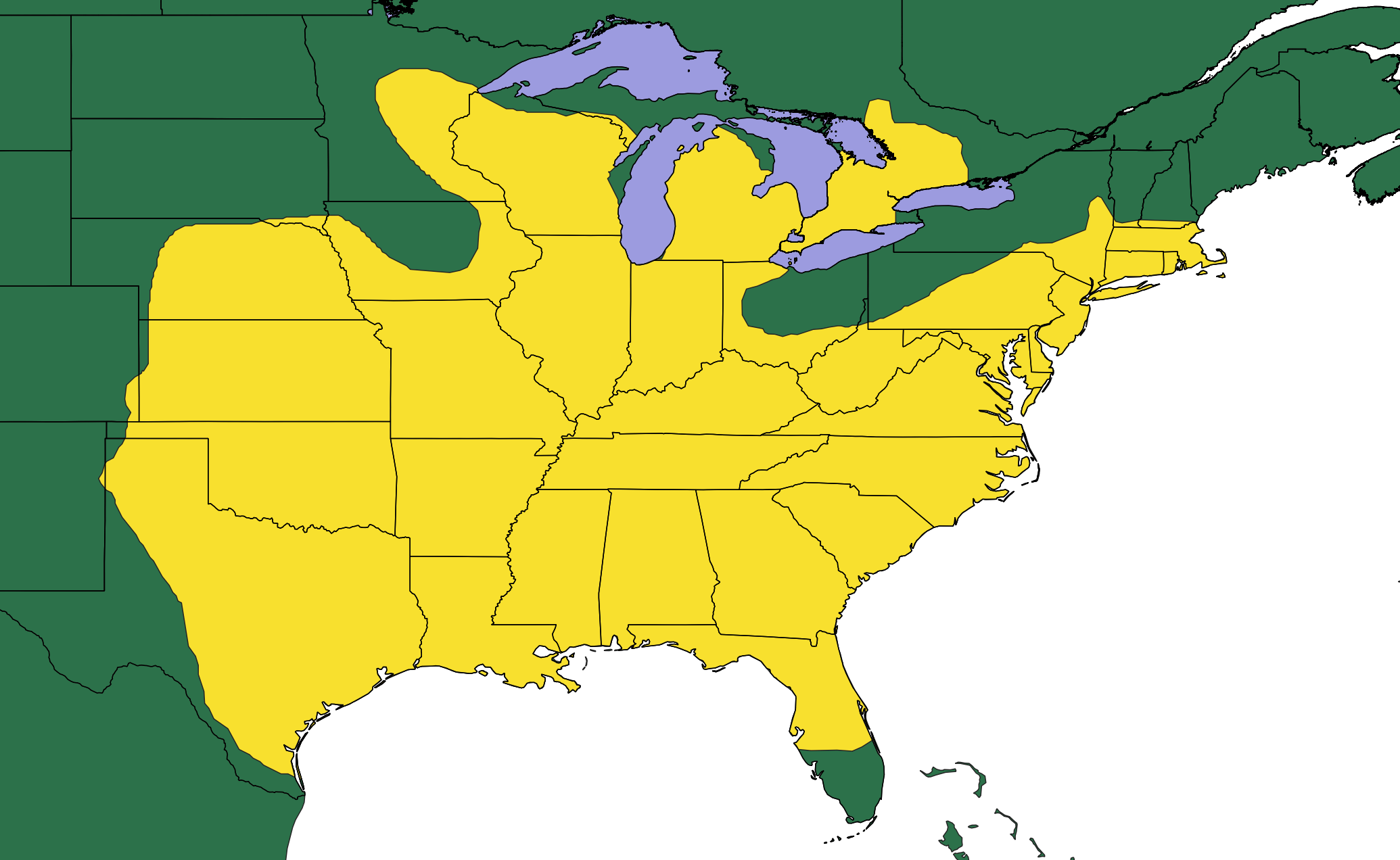

Synonyms
- List: Heterodon platirhinos Latreille in Sonnini & Latreille, 1801; Coluber heterodon Daudin, 1803; Heterodon niger Holbrook, 1842; Heterodon platyrhinos Baird & Girard, 1853; Heterodon platyrhinus A.M.C. Duméril, Bibron & A.H.A. Duméril, 1854; Heterodon niger A.M.C. Duméril & Bibron, 1854; Heterodon browni Stejneger, 1903; Heterodon contortrix M.J. Allen, 1932; Heterodon contortrix Burt, 1935; Heterodon contortrix Grant, 1937; Heterodon contortrix browni Carr, 1940; Heterodon platirhinos Conant & Collins, 1991; Heterodon platirhinos Crother, 2000; Heterodon platyrhinos Purser, 2003; Heterodon platirhinos Wallach, K. Williams & Boundy, 2014

= Eastern hognose snake =

Species of snake

The eastern hog-nosed snake (Heterodon platirhinos) is a species of mildly venomous rear-fanged snake in the family Colubridae. The venom is specifically adapted to amphibian prey and is harmless to humans. However, some people may have an allergic reaction and as a result experience local swelling and other symptoms. The species is endemic to North America. No subspecies are recognized as being valid. This species prefers habitats with sandy soils and a combination of grass fields and forest edges. It occurs in many different colorations and has the identifiable upturned "snout". It can be found in captivity, but is a relatively difficult species to keep due to a specialized diet of toads. As with other Heterodon species, it has a distinctive threat reaction of first bluffing by striking with a closed mouth and then, if this fails to deter the threat, pretending to die.

== Geographic distribution ==
Heterodon platirhinos has a wide geographical range from the central United States to the East Coast. In the northern parts of its range, it can be found in southern Ontario, southern New Hampshire, Minnesota, Wisconsin, and Massachusetts. Farther west, the snake can be found in Texas and Kansas. The southern part of its range extends into southern Florida. Populations start to dwindle as the species reaches the northern limit of its range.

== Habitat ==
The preferred habitats of H. platirhinos are upland sandy pine forests, old fields, and forest edges. Like most of the genus Heterodon, it prefers dry conditions with loose soil for burrowing. These loose soils are preferable habitat components for nesting and egg laying. Barrier beach and dune ecosystems appear to contain some of the highest densities of H. platirhinos because of abundant prey (primarily anurans of the genus Anaxyrus). At the northern end of its range, it has been found to prefer developed lands as its desired habitat, followed by mixed forests dominated by hemlock trees, pitch pines, or oaks. In Canada, its average home range size is about 40 hectares (99 acres). Its habitats include southeastern and midwestern woodlands, tall-grassland prairies, and grassy or cultivated fields along woodland edges. Its habitat range tends to increase with grass and leaf litter.

== Etymology ==
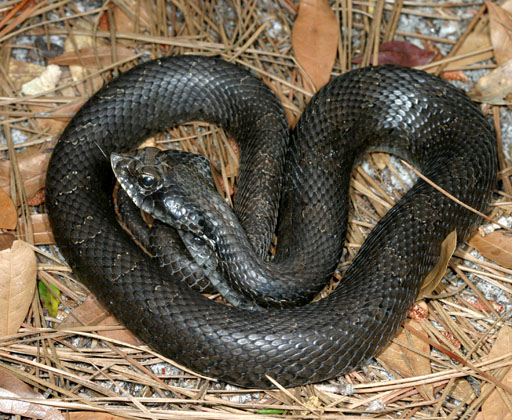
North Carolina specimen

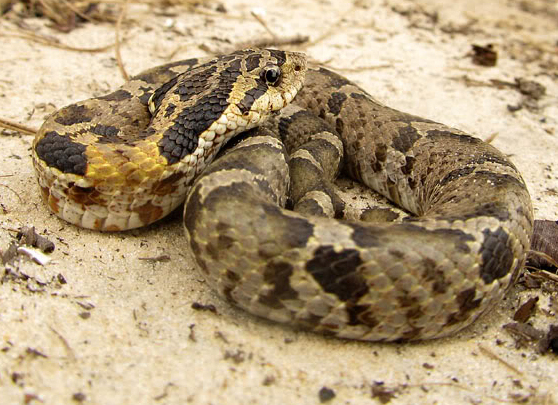
Florida specimen

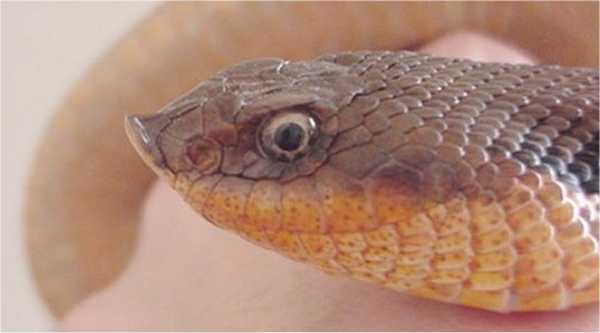
Closeup of the head of H. platirhinos

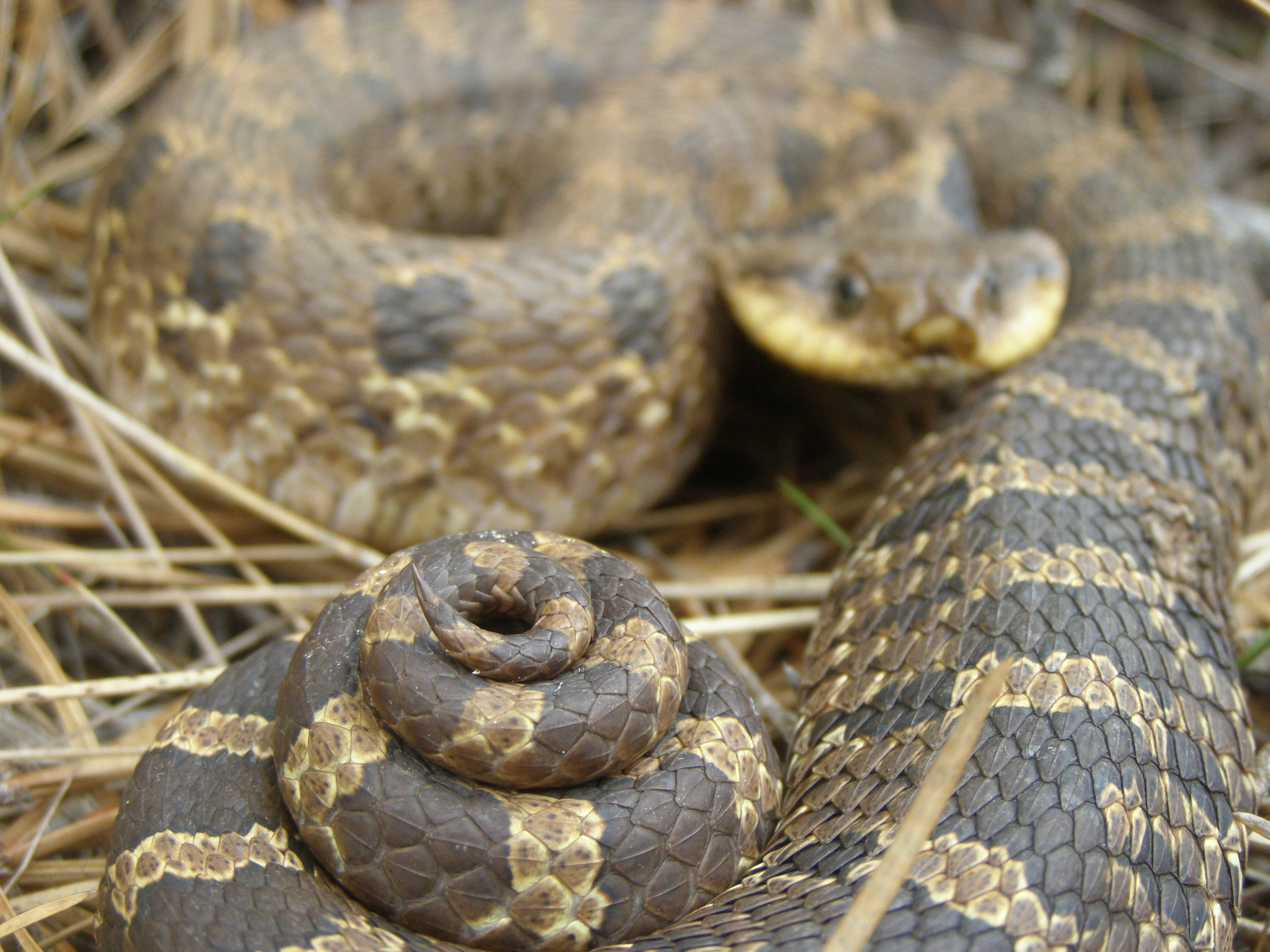
Cape Cod, Massachusetts, specimen

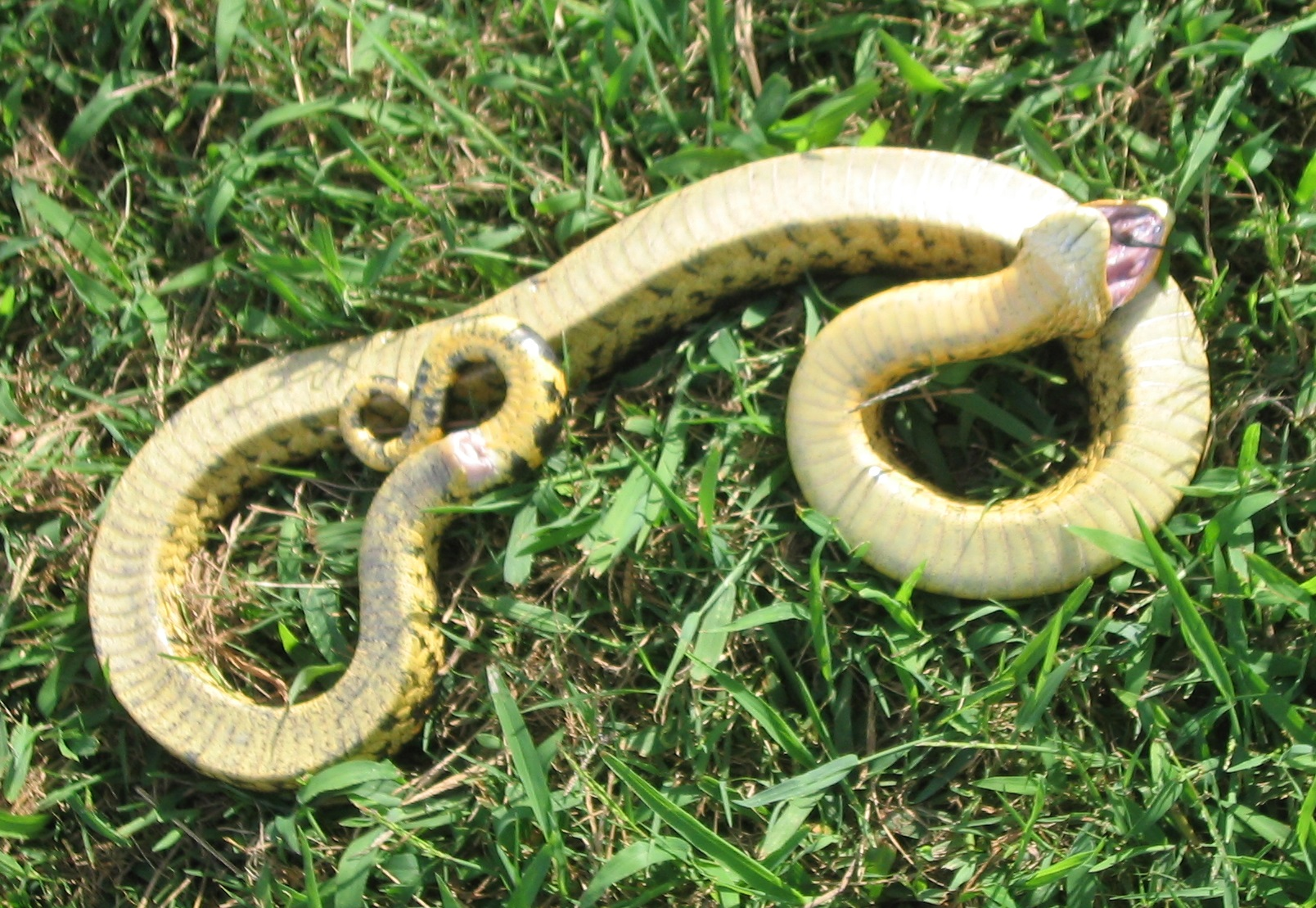
H. platirhinos playing dead

The generic name Heterodon is derived from the Greek words heteros meaning "different" and odon meaning "tooth." The specific name platirhinos is derived from the Greek words platys meaning "broad or flat" and rhinos meaning "snout."

== Description ==
Heterodon platyrhinos is described as being quite stout-bodied. Its color pattern is extremely variable, from red, green, or orange to brown, gray, or black, or any combination thereof depending on locality. Dorsally, it can be blotched, checkered, or patternless. The belly tends to be a solid gray, yellow, or cream-colored. In this species, the underside of the tail is lighter than the belly. Its most distinguishing feature is the upturned snout, used for digging in sandy soils. The average adult of H. platirhinos measures 71 cm (28 in) in total length (tail included), with females being larger than males. The maximum recorded total length is 116 cm (46 in).

== Behavior ==
The eastern hognose is a diurnal species. It occurs in low densities, preferring to remain cryptic. It is typically most active during April–September after coming out of hibernation. Because it has such a wide range, variation in the population's climates can cause the period of activity to change. In northern climates, hibernation starts earlier in late September–October, whereas in southern climates, the snake might not retreat until November. Some have been recorded to still be active between December and February in Florida and along the Gulf Coast. If the temperature reaches or drops below 19°C, hibernation will begin for the snake. This hibernation period takes place alone in burrows either dug by the snake or already-made mammal burrows. To burrow, a snake forces its head into the soil then moves its head back and forth. For hibernation, these burrows will reach depths of 25 centimeters or more.

=== Defensive behavior ===
When the eastern hognose snake is threatened, its neck flattens and the head raises off the ground, like a cobra. It also hisses and may strike with its mouth closed, but it does not attempt to bite— a behavior known as "bluffing". The result can be likened to a high-speed head butt. If this threat display does not work to deter a would-be predator, an eastern hognose snake often rolls onto its back and plays dead, going so far as to emit a foul musk from its cloaca and let its tongue hang out of its mouth. One individual was observed playing dead for 45 minutes before reanimating and moving away. This death-feigning behavior was also observed often in water habitats. The duration and likelihood of death-feigning behavior in hognose snakes can vary depending on both intrinsic factors (such as individual condition) and extrinsic factors (such as predator type or environmental context).

== Diet ==
The eastern hognose snake preys extensively on amphibians and has a particular fondness for toads. This snake has resistance to the toxins toads secrete. This immunity is thought to come from enlarged adrenal glands, which secrete large amounts of hormones to counteract the toads' powerful skin poisons. At the rear of each upper jaw, it has enlarged teeth, which are neither hollow nor grooved, with which it punctures and deflates toads to be able to swallow them whole. It also consumes other amphibians, such as frogs and salamanders. Like all other snakes, it eats its prey whole. Because it is a toad-feeding specialist, its venom is adapted to be effective against toads and has not been found to be harmful to humans.

== Reproduction ==
Eastern hognose snakes mate in early April and May. Both the male and female snakes are known to have multiple mates during this season. The act of copulation can last for up to 3 days. Occasionally, a second breeding period occurs around September and October. Rather than fertilizing a new egg clutch at this time, females instead store sperm until the spring for use. Males follow the pheromone trails left behind by females on the move. Some females have been observed traveling past viable nesting conditions to reach communal nesting sites. Eggs might be laid in small soil depressions, mammal burrows, or under rocks, depending on the region. The female may even dig the burrow herself, often choosing open and grassy areas with few herbs or shrubs because these areas get more sunlight, providing the warm temperatures needed for the proper development of the eggs. The females, which lay up to 40 eggs (average about 25) in June or early July. The eggs, which measure about 33 mm × 23 mm (1 1/3 in × 1 in), hatch after about 60 days, from late July to September. The hatchlings are about 16.5–21.0 cm (6.5–8.3 in) long. They have an average nest temperature of 23–26 °C (73–79 °F) incubating for 49–63 days. Some parental care is shown by the female, such as nest and young guarding through hissing and chasing. Typically, males reach maturity around 40 cm (16 in) in snout–vent length (SVL), which can take up to 24 months. Females, however, reach maturity around 45 cm (18 in) SVL, taking up to 21 months.

== Venom ==
Heterodon platirhinos is a mildly venomous species, but the effects are not deadly to humans. Heterodon means "different tooth", which refers to the enlarged teeth at the rear of the upper jaw. These teeth inject a mild amphibian-specific venom into prey. The fangs receive the venom from the snake's Duvernoy's gland. Bitten humans who are allergic to the saliva have been known to experience local swelling, burning, discoloration, and bleeding from the wounds, but no human deaths have been documented.

== Predators ==
The many predators of the eastern hognose snake include tarantulas, common kingsnakes, cottonmouths, crows, red-tailed hawks, barred owls, raccoons, Virginia opossums, red foxes, and humans.

== Human impact ==
Humans cause mortality of H. platyrhinos from pollution and pesticide poisoning, habitat destruction, vehicular deaths, and intentional hunting. Eastern hognose snakes avoid crossing paved roads, increasing the isolation of populations. The snakes cross unpaved roads, but face higher mortality from vehicle collisions.

== Captivity ==
The hognose snake is an intermediate-level reptile to keep and lives between 10 and 15 years in captivity. Typically, mice and rats are used to feed most snakes in captivity. With this species being a toad specialist, getting them to eat thawed mice can be problematic. Scenting the food with toad or lizard is a trick used by hobbyists to entice the snake. Being a solitary species, snakes are kept individually unless kept for intentional breeding. Due to its burrowing nature, the hognose snake requires suitable substrate depth to retain this natural instinct.

== Conservation status ==
Heterodon platirhinos is classified as least concern on the IUCN Red List of Threatened Species (assessed in 2007). It is a species of increasing conservation concern, though, especially in the northeastern part of its range. Of the five states in the northeast U.S. where the eastern hognose snake occurs, it currently has "listed" conservation status in four (Connecticut, New Hampshire, New York, and Rhode Island). Noted declines are believed to be the result of direct anthropogenic pressures, including habitat loss and fragmentation, road mortality, environmental degradation, and intentional killing. Some of this habitat fragmentation may be due to the snake's having a reluctance to cross paved roads. In the Eastern United States, pitch pine-scrub oak barrens are an imperiled, disturbance-dependent community that has declined substantially due to wildfires that have threatened vertebrates such as the eastern hognose snake.

== Gallery ==
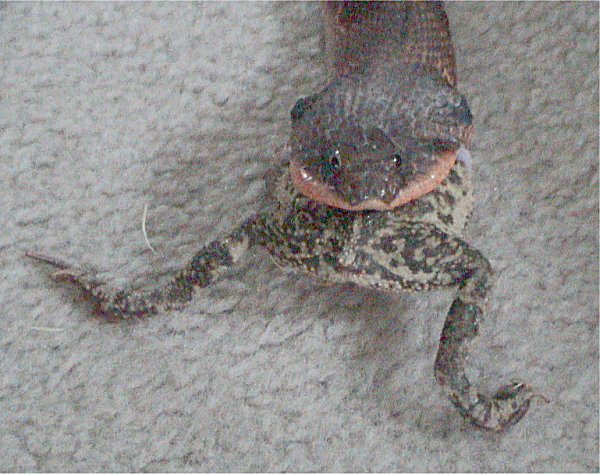
H. platirhinos eating a toad

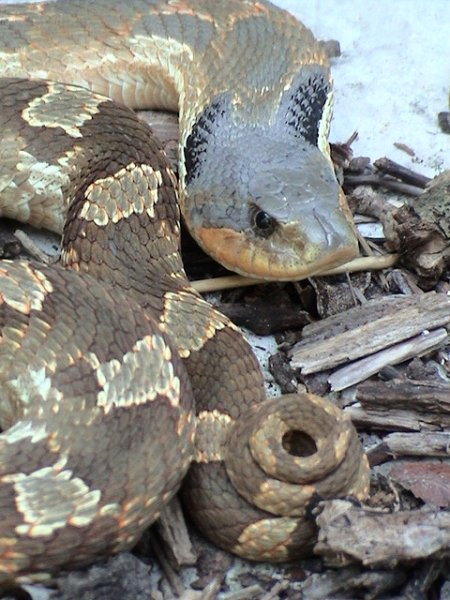
H. platirhinos

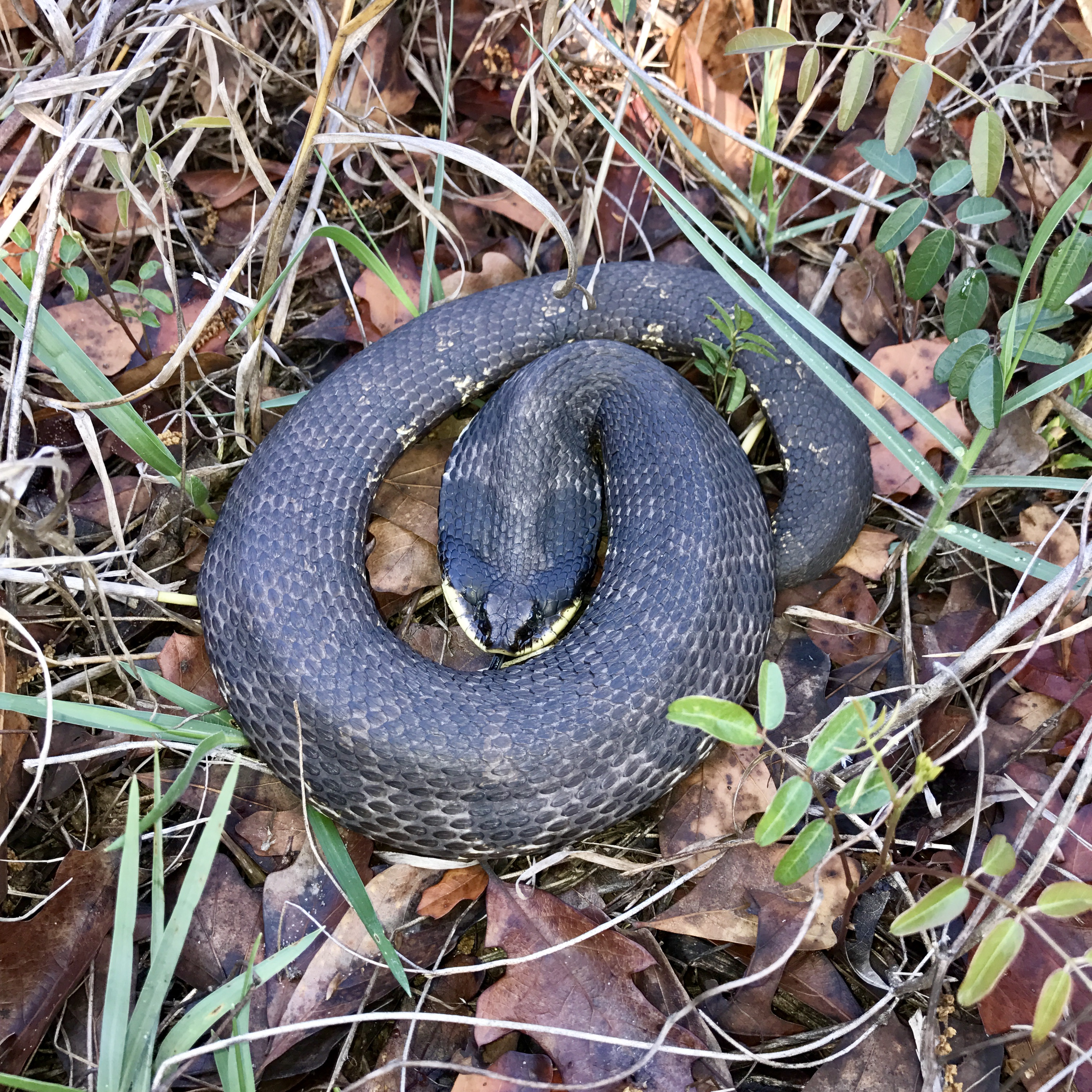
H. platirhinos dark color pattern

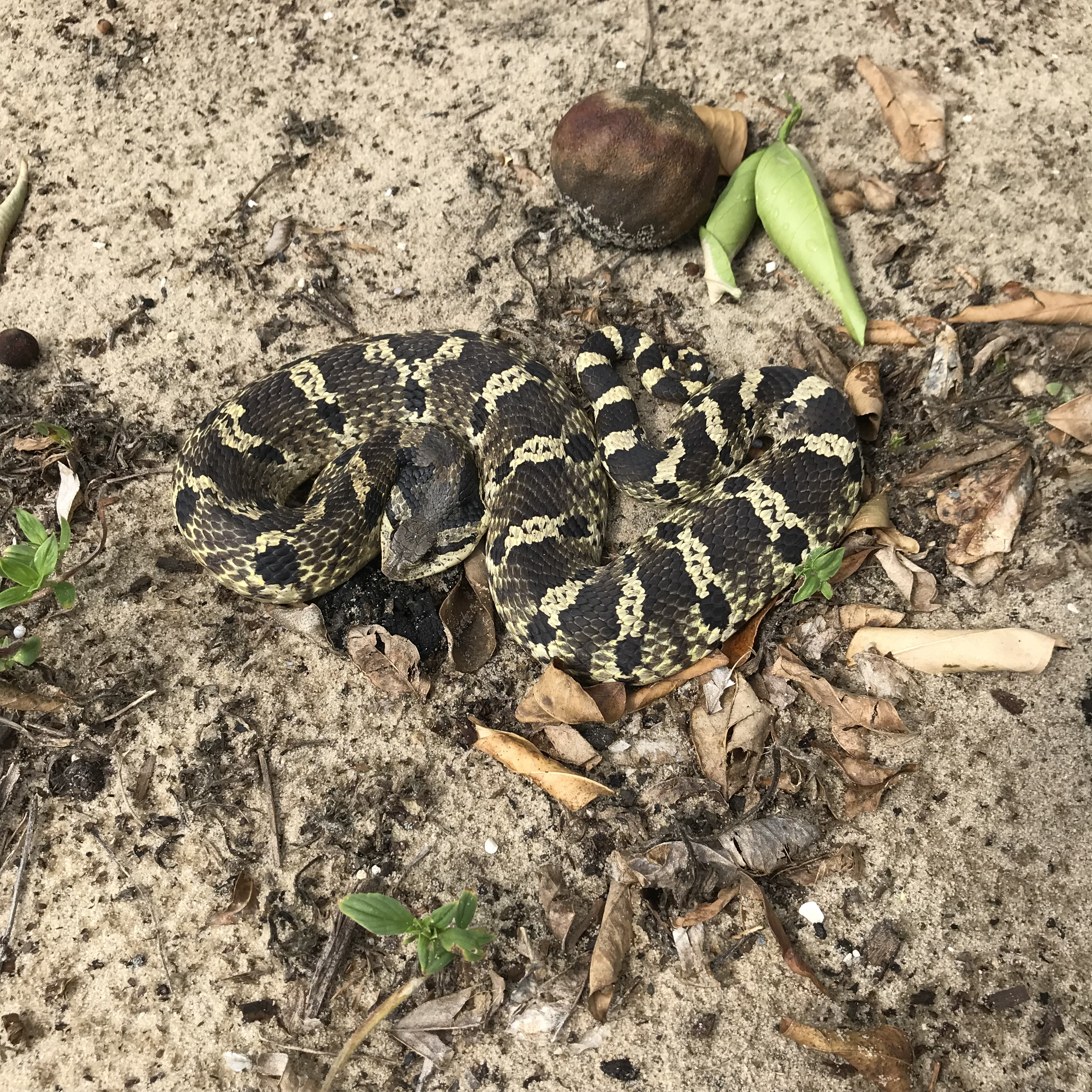
H. platirhinos in a Florida orange grove
