= Americans Who Tell the Truth =

American arts and education organization

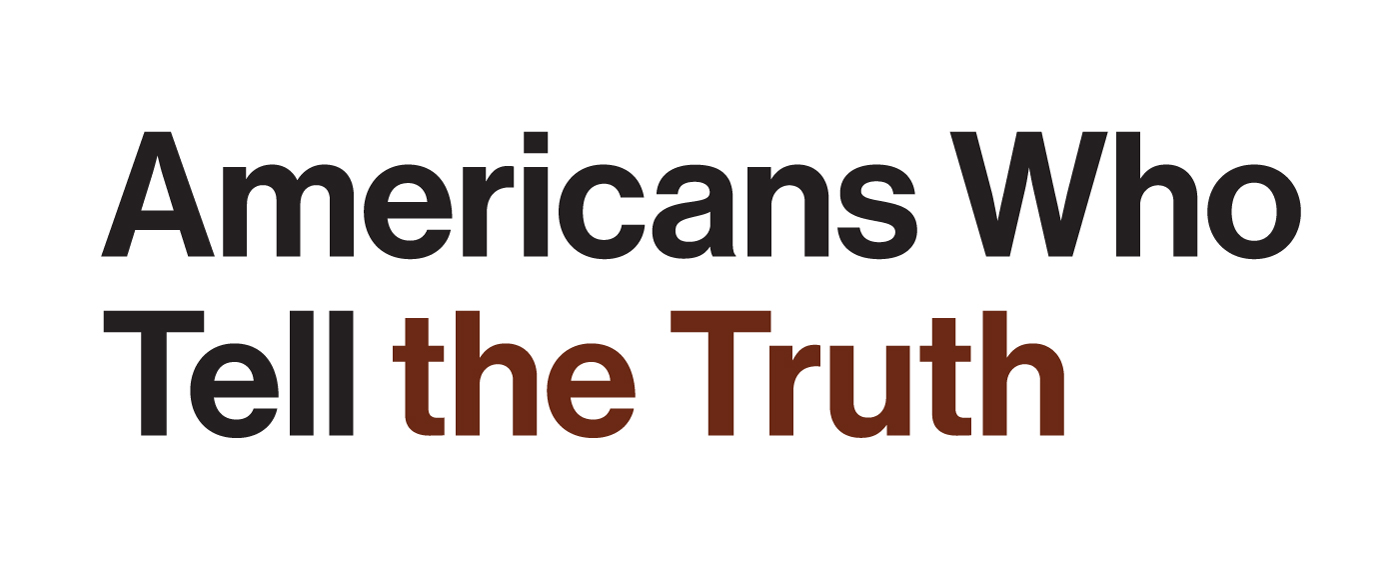
- American Who Tell the Truth logo
- Formation: 2002; 24 years ago
- Founder: Robert Shetterly
- Type: Nonprofit organization
- Headquarters: Brooksville, Maine, U.S.
- Website: Official website

Americans Who Tell the Truth (AWTT) is a nonprofit arts and education organization based in the United States, founded in 2002 by artist Robert Shetterly. The organization is dedicated to promoting civic engagement, social justice, democracy, and environmental stewardship through the integration of art, history, education, and community involvement.

== History ==
The AWTT project began as a personal artistic endeavor in response to the Bush/Cheney administration lying about the reason for attacking Iraq. Shetterly created a series of portraits depicting individuals he regarded as "truth-tellers," who exemplified civic courage. This initiative evolved into a formal nonprofit organization in 2004, broadening its scope through traveling exhibitions and partnerships with educational institutions.

== Portraits ==
AWTT's collection comprises over 280 acrylic portraits painted on wood panels, each accompanied by a quotation from the subject. Notable figures featured in the collection include activists, educators, and community leaders such as Martin Luther King Jr., Shannon Watts, James Baldwin, Joanna Macy, and Richard Blanco. The portraits serve as a visual representation of those who have made impactful contributions to society.

== Founder/Artist ==
Robert Shetterly, a painter and activist based in Maine, is the founder of Americans Who Tell the Truth. His personal commitment to social justice and civic engagement is reflected in his artistic practice.

== Mission & Education ==
The mission of AWTT is to foster democratic values and civic participation through art and education. The organization integrates Shetterly's portraits into lesson plans, storytelling projects, and public programs. These programs aim to facilitate community discovery and emphasize the role of history in shaping individuals' lives.

Educational initiatives include:

- Samantha Smith Challenge
- School Partnership Program
- Speaking Truth to Youth
- Show Us Who You Are

== Documentary ==
The documentary Truth Tellers (2021), directed by Richard Kane, profiles Shetterly and the AWTT project, featuring interviews with subjects and footage from exhibitions. The film was distributed nationally by PBS and widely reviewed

== Exhibitions ==
AWTT portraits have been exhibited across more than 35 states in various venues, including schools, libraries, churches, and museums. Exhibitions include:

- The Rockwell Museum, Corning, New York (2018)
- Cornell University, New York (2021)
- York Public Library, Maine (2023)
- Colby College, Maine (2023)
- New Jersey Education Association Convention (2024)
- Maxwell School of Citizenship & Public Affairs, Syracuse University, New York (2015-2024)
- Grace Street Gallery, Vanderbilt, North Carolina (2024)
- Bates Mill, Maine (2024)
- Curb Center, James Madison University, Virginia (2025)
- Albany Institute of History & Art, New York (2025)

== Publications ==
- Americans Who Tell the Truth (Dutton, 2005).
- Portraits of Racial Justice (2021).
- Portraits of Earth Justice (2022).
- Portraits of Peacemakers (2024).

== Awards and commendations ==
Robert Shetterly and AWTT have received multiple accolades, including:

- Rising Tide Award from the Maine People's Alliance (2005)
- Honorary Member of the Maine Chapter of Veterans for Peace (2005)
- Distinguished Achievement Award from the University of Southern Maine (2007)
- Honorary Doctorate in Humane Letters from the University of New England (2007)
- Woodrow Wilson Visiting Fellow (2009)
- Honorary Doctorate of Humane Letters from the University of Maine at Farmington (2011)
- Hands of Peace Award from the Peace & Justice Center of Eastern Maine (2012)
- Use of Shetterly's portrait of Shirley Chisholm on a USPS Black Heritage Series postage stamp (2014)
- Ashley Bryan Arts and Humanities Award from the Maine Education Association (2023)
- Named Art Advocate of the Year by the Maine Art Education Association (2024)
