= Indigenous Peoples Law and Policy Program =

The James E. Rogers College of Law at the University of Arizona has created an academic center for the study of American Indian and indigenous peoples law, policy, and human rights. The Indigenous Peoples Law and Policy (IPLP) Program furthers the research, training, and advocacy of Indian law and international law of indigenous peoples.

Courses and clinical opportunities are offered in areas of law and policy concerning indigenous peoples in the United States and around the world. What makes the Indigenous Peoples Law and Policy (IPLP) Program at the University of Arizona Law (Arizona Law) unique is our approach to legal education in the field of federal Indian law, tribal law and policy, and indigenous peoples human rights. Students are trained in the classroom and in real-world settings by faculty who are leaders both in their academic fields and as practitioners in tribal, national, and international forums. Through clinical studies and direct advocacy under the supervision of the world's most distinguished scholars in the field, students and practitioners provide legal and other forms of assistance to local and international indigenous communities.

The IPLP Program has been involved in numerous indigenous legal issues around the world. Students and professors in the IPLP Program have assisted Central American Maya villages that have filed lawsuits in the Belize Supreme Court alleging that both the attorney general of Belize and the minister of Natural Resources and Environment had violated their property rights.

Faculty and students of the IPLP Program have worked in coordination with other groups representing Carrie Dann and recently deceased Mary Dann, who have struggled against the federal government for decades over Western Shoshone territory, in precedent-setting proceedings before the Organization of American States' Inter-American Commission on Human Rights and the United Nations Committee on the Elimination of Racial Discrimination. It culminated with the Inter-American Commission issuing a report in which it condemned the United States for violating the Dann sisters' human rights.

In addition, IPLP Program personnel and affiliates have worked with the people of Awas Tingni, a Mayangna (Sumo) indigenous community located on the Atlantic Coast in Nicaragua, for many years with the landmark case decided by the Inter-American Court of Human Rights, Mayagna (Sumo) Community of Awas Tingni v. Nicaragua. After a lengthy legal battle, the community successfully gained legal recognition of its customary land tenure.

== Faculty ==
- Robert A. Williams Jr. – Regents' Professor of Law; Faculty Co-Chair; Indigenous Peoples Law and Policy Program
- Rebecca Tsosie – Regents' Professor of Law; Special Advisor to the Provost for Diversity and Inclusion; Faculty Co-Chair; Indigenous Peoples Law and Policy Program
- Melissa L. Tatum – Research Professor of Law; Faculty Chair; American Indian Studies
- Seanna Howard – Externship Coordinator; Professor of Practice
- James Diamond – Director, IPLP Tribal Justice Clinic; Professor of Practice
- Robert A. Hershey – Professor Emeritus
- James C. Hopkins – Associate Clinical Professor; Indigenous Peoples Law and Policy Program
- Joseph P. Kalt – Adjunct Professor
