= James E. Rogers College of Law =

Law school at the University of Arizona

University of Arizona James E. Rogers College of Law
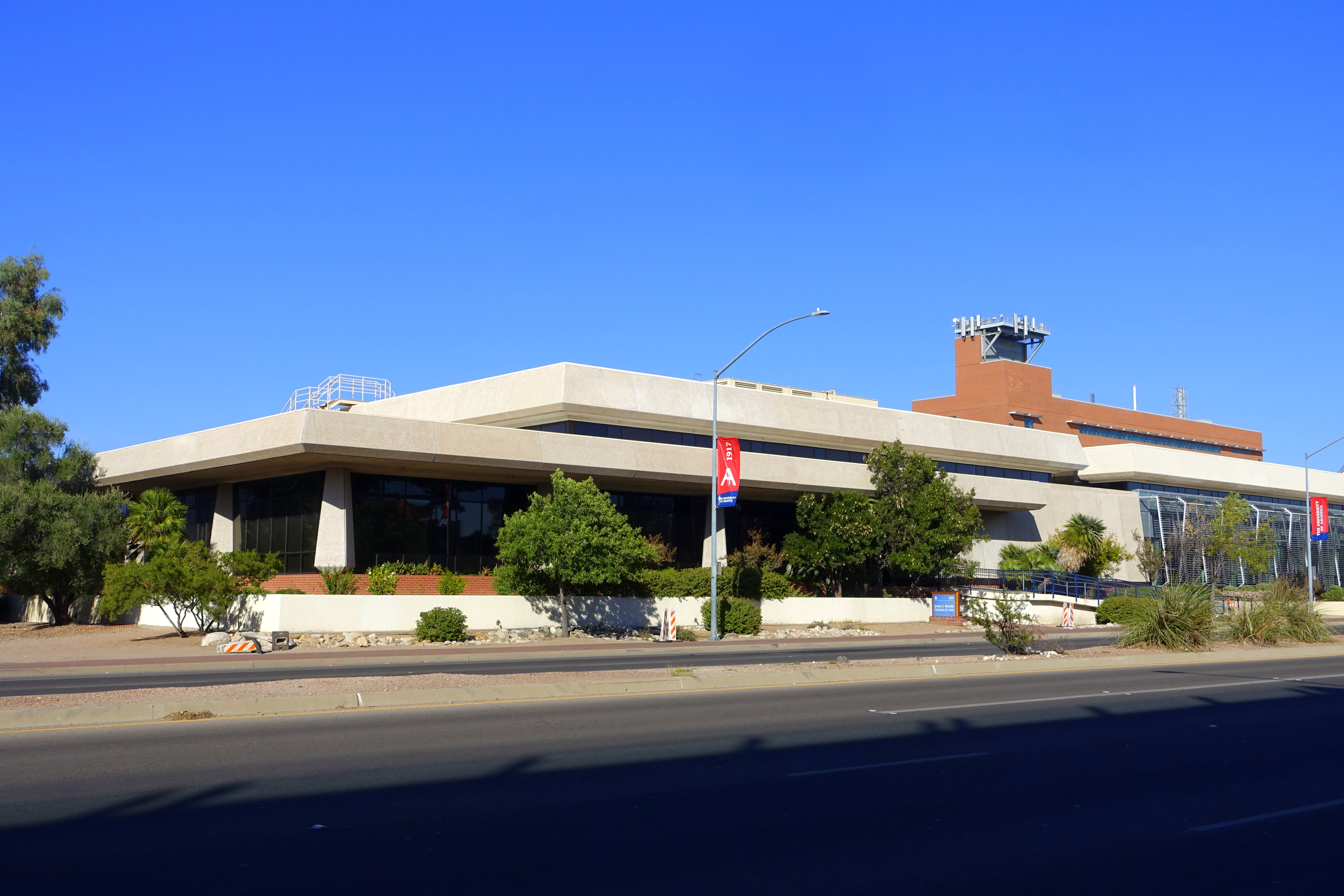
- Parent school: University of Arizona
- Established: 1915; 111 years ago
- School type: Public law school
- Dean: Jason Kreag
- Location: Tucson, Arizona, United States; 32.2364°N 110.9530°W
- Enrollment: 338 (2026)
- Faculty: 67 (2026)
- USNWR ranking: 70th (tie) (2026)
- Bar pass rate: 84.1% (first-time)
- Website: https://law.arizona.edu/

University of Arizona James E. Rogers College of Law, also known as the University of Arizona College of Law, is the law school at the University of Arizona located in Tucson, Arizona, United States and was the first law school founded in the State of Arizona, opening its doors in 1915. It was renamed in 1999 in honor of broadcasting executive James E. Rogers, a 1962 graduate of the school, and chairman of Sunbelt Communications Company based in Las Vegas, Nevada.

Each entering JD class at Arizona Law has around 150 students, with a total student body of 700 students (across all programs).

According to Arizona's 2017 ABA-required disclosures, 84.4% of the Class of 2017 obtained full-time, long-term, JD-required or JD-advantage employment nine months after graduation.

== Employment ==
According to Arizona's official 2013 ABA-required disclosures, 70.7% of the Class of 2013 obtained full-time, long-term, JD-required or JD-advantage employment nine months after graduation. Arizona's Law School Transparency under-employment score is 21.8%, indicating the percentage of the Class of 2013 unemployed, pursuing an additional degree, or working in a non-professional, short-term, or part-time job nine months after graduation. As a regional school, the vast majority of Arizona graduates are employed in Arizona.

ABA Employment Summary for 2013 Graduates
Employment Status	Percentage
Employed – Bar Passage Required	61.2%
Employed – J.D. Advantage	15.0%
Employed – Professional Position	4.0%
Employed – Non-Professional Position	0.0%
Employed – Undeterminable	0.0%
Pursuing Graduate Degree Full Time	1.4%
Unemployed – Start Date Deferred	0.7%
Unemployed – Not Seeking	0.0%
Unemployed – Seeking	14.3%
Employment Status Unknown	3.4%
Total of 147 Graduates

== Costs ==
The total cost of attendance (indicating the cost of tuition, fees, and living expenses) for the three-year JD program at the University of Arizona James E. Rogers College of Law for the 2016–2017 academic year for Arizona Residents is $46,375 and $51,875 for Non-Residents.

== Programs and centers ==
The James. E. Rogers College of law is one of the only US law schools that offers a Bachelor's of Arts (BA) in Law degree, a Master of Professional Studies (MPS) degree, and a Master of Legal Studies (MLS) degree. In addition to the J.D. program, the school offers L.L.M. and S.J.D. degrees in Indigenous Peoples Law and Policy, and International Trade and Business Law. The International Trade and Business Law program is offered in coordination with the National Law Center for Inter-American Free Trade. Students finishing their L.L.M. degree in either program may continue on to an S.J.D. degree after completing substantial original research in their field of study. Arizona Law also offers a two-year J.D. with Advanced Standing (J.D.A.S.), designed for students who have received their first law degree from a university outside the United States. This two-year J.D. provides up to one year's worth of credits (or 29 units) for non-U.S. legal studies, effectively allowing admitted students to skip the second year of law school and go directly from completing the traditional first-year curriculum to the third year of law school.

The Programs & Centers include:

- Business Law Program
- Criminal Law and Policy Program
- Environmental Law, Science & Policy Program
- Indigenous Peoples Law and Policy Program
- International Trade and Business Law Program
- JD Program
- Legal Writing Program
- National Law Center
- The William H. Rehnquist Center on the Constitutional Structures of Government

The school offers J.D. students the opportunity to earn certificates in: Criminal Law & Policy, Environmental Law, Science & Policy Program, Indigenous Peoples Law and Policy and International Trade and Business Law. Arizona Law also offers concentrations in: Intellectual Property Law, International Law, and Tax Law.

For students wishing to study the law who do not want to become attorneys, the school also offers a Master of Legal Studies degree with several optional concentrations.

== Rankings and reputation ==
Arizona Law is fully accredited by the American Bar Association. It is currently ranked 70th nationally by U.S. News & World Report's "2026 Best Law Schools". Arizona Law is one of 81 law schools nationwide to have a chapter of the Order of the Coif.

=== Journals ===
The school is home to three student-run journals:

- Arizona Law Review
- Arizona Journal of International and Comparative Law
- Arizona Journal of Environmental Law and Policy

The school also houses the Journal of Appellate Practice and Process, that it acquired from the University of Arkansas.

== Faculty ==
Jason Kreag is the current dean. There are 41 full-time faculty members.

- Rebecca Tsosie, Regents Professor and Morris K. Udall Professor of Law, associate justice on the Fort McDowell Yavapai Nation Supreme Court (2008–present), judge on the San Carlos Apache Court of Appeals (2007–2024)

== Notable alumni ==
- Brent T. Adams (1948–2022), Judge, Nevada Second Judicial District Court
- Bobby Baldock (born 1936), United States federal judge
- Andrew Leo Bettwy (born 1920), former Arizona State Land Commissioner
- Andy Biggs (born 1958), United States congressman representing the 5th district.
- William Docker Browning (1931–2008), United States federal judge
- Dennis K. Burke (born 1962), former United States Attorney for the District of Arizona
- David C. Bury (born 1942), United States federal judge
- Raner Collins (born 1952), United States federal judge
- Valdemar Aguirre Cordova (1922–1988), United States federal judge
- Hayzel Burton Daniels (1907–1992), Arizona state legislator and city magistrate
- Roopali Desai (born 1978), Circuit Court Judge for the Ninth Circuit Court of Appeals
- Stanley G. Feldman (born 1933), Former Chief Justice of Arizona
- Cleon H. Foust (1907–2003), 32nd Indiana Attorney General
- William C. Frey (1919–1979), United States federal judge
- Dennis DeConcini (born 1937), former U.S. Senator
- Irma Elsa Gonzalez (born 1948), U.S. District Court judge for the Southern District of California
- Charles Leach Hardy (born 1919), United States federal judge
- John C. Hinderaker (born 1968), United States federal judge
- Ed Hochuli (born 1950), attorney and National Football League referee
- Cindy K. Jorgenson (born 1953), U.S District Court judge for the District of Arizona
- Ann Kirkpatrick (born 1950), former U.S. Representative from Arizona's 1st district
- Jon Kyl (1942–2026), U.S. Senator representing Arizona
- Stephen M. McNamee (born 1942), United States federal judge
- Alfredo Chavez Marquez (born 1922), United States federal judge
- Charles Andrew Muecke (1918–2007), United States federal judge
- Thomas W. Murphy (1935–1992), Associate Justice of the High Court of American Samoa
- Scott H. Rash (born 1963), United States federal judge
- Christina Reiss (born 1962), U.S. District Court judge for the District of Vermont
- Mary Anne Richey (1917–1983), United States federal judge
- John Roll (1947–2011), murdered United States federal judge
- Paul Gerhardt Rosenblatt (born 1928), United States federal judge
- Eldon Rudd (1920–2002), former U.S. Representative from Arizona's 4th district
- James A. Teilborg (born 1942), United States federal judge
- Jesse Addison Udall (1893–1980), Chief Justice of the Arizona Supreme Court
- Mo Udall (1922–1998), US Congressman from Arizona's 2nd District (1961–91), Chair of the House Interior Committee
- Stewart Udall (1920–2010), US Congressman from Arizona's 2nd District, 37th United States Secretary of the Interior
- Hal Warnock (1912–1997), attorney and baseball player for the St. Louis Browns
- Harry Clay Westover (1894–1983), United States federal judge
- Frank R. Zapata (born 1944), United States federal judge
- Lorna E. Lockwood (1903-1977), First Female State Supreme Court Chief Justice in the United States
