= Hooknose snake =

Hooknose snake is a common name which may refer to several species of snake from the following genera:

- Ficimia
- Gyalopion
