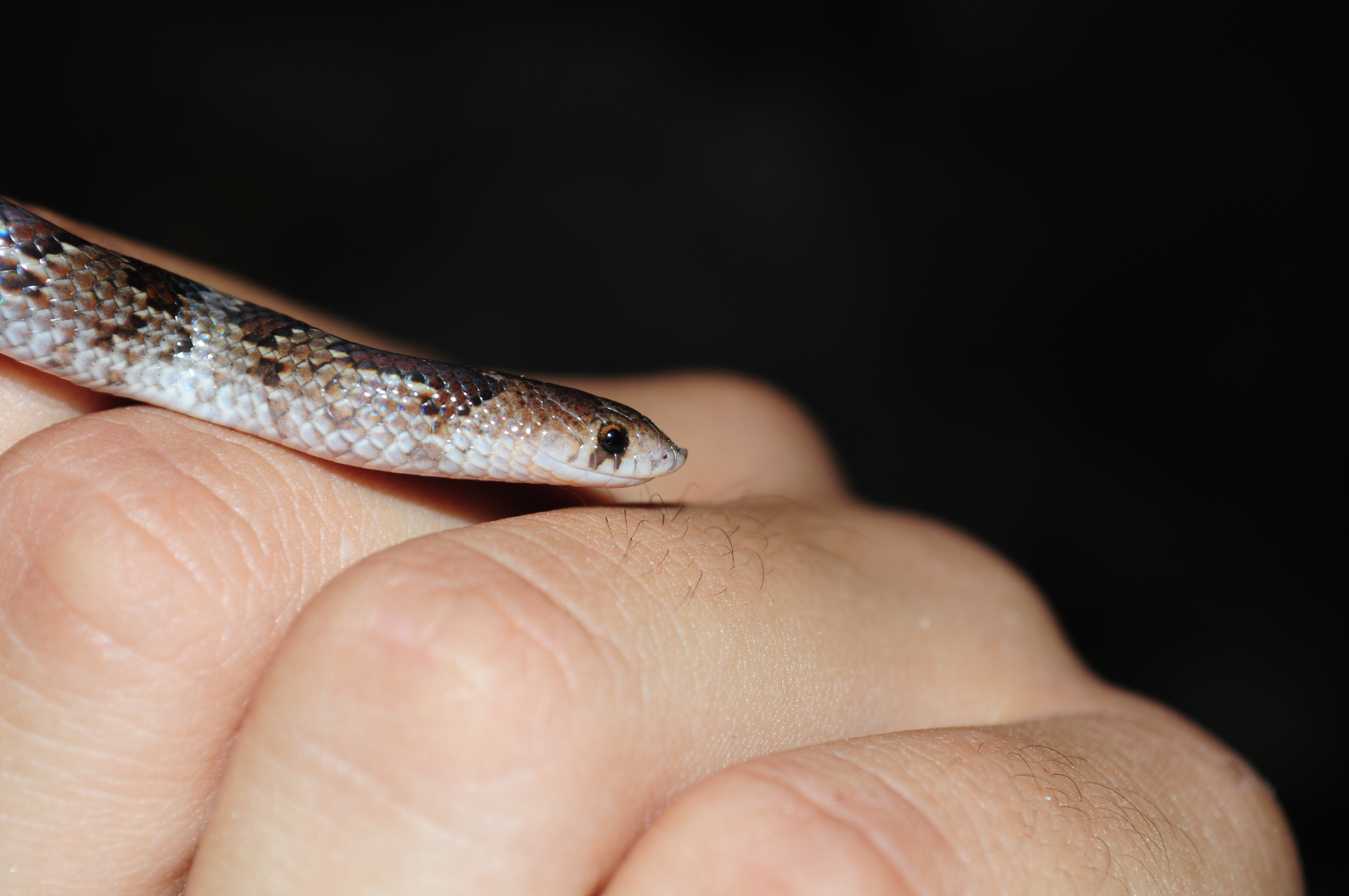

Conservation status
- Least Concern (IUCN 3.1)

Scientific classification
- Kingdom: Animalia
- Phylum: Chordata
- Class: Reptilia
- Order: Squamata
- Suborder: Serpentes
- Family: Colubridae
- Genus: Ficimia
- Species: F. publia

Binomial name
- Ficimia publia Cope, 1866

= Ficimia publia =

Species of snake

Ficimia publia (common name: blotched hooknose snake) is a species of colubrid snake, indigenous to southern Mexico (Yucatan, Jalisco, and Morelos), Belize, Guatemala, and Honduras.

== Appearance ==
The blotched hooknose snake is so called because of its sharp-edged upturned snout. It is normally pale tan, pale brown, yellowish tan, orange-tan or reddish brown in colour.

== Diet ==
The snake has a diet of mostly spiders and insects, and uses its characteristic 'hooked nose' to forage through the debris on the forest floor.

== Defence ==
When scared or threatened the snake coils up and opens its mouth before striking. It is harmless and not poisonous, but it resembles the venomous variable coral snake, and this frightens predators away.
