= Tamaulipan =

Tamaulipan refers to something from Tamaulipas, Mexico. It may also refer to:

- Tamaulipan mezquital
- Tamaulipan matorral
- Tamaulipan woodrat
- Tamaulipan rock rattlesnake
- Tamaulipan pastizal
- Tamaulipan montane garter snake
- Tamaulipan hooknose snake
- Tamaulipan clubtail
- Tamaulipan Fiddlewood
- Tamaulipan lichen moth
