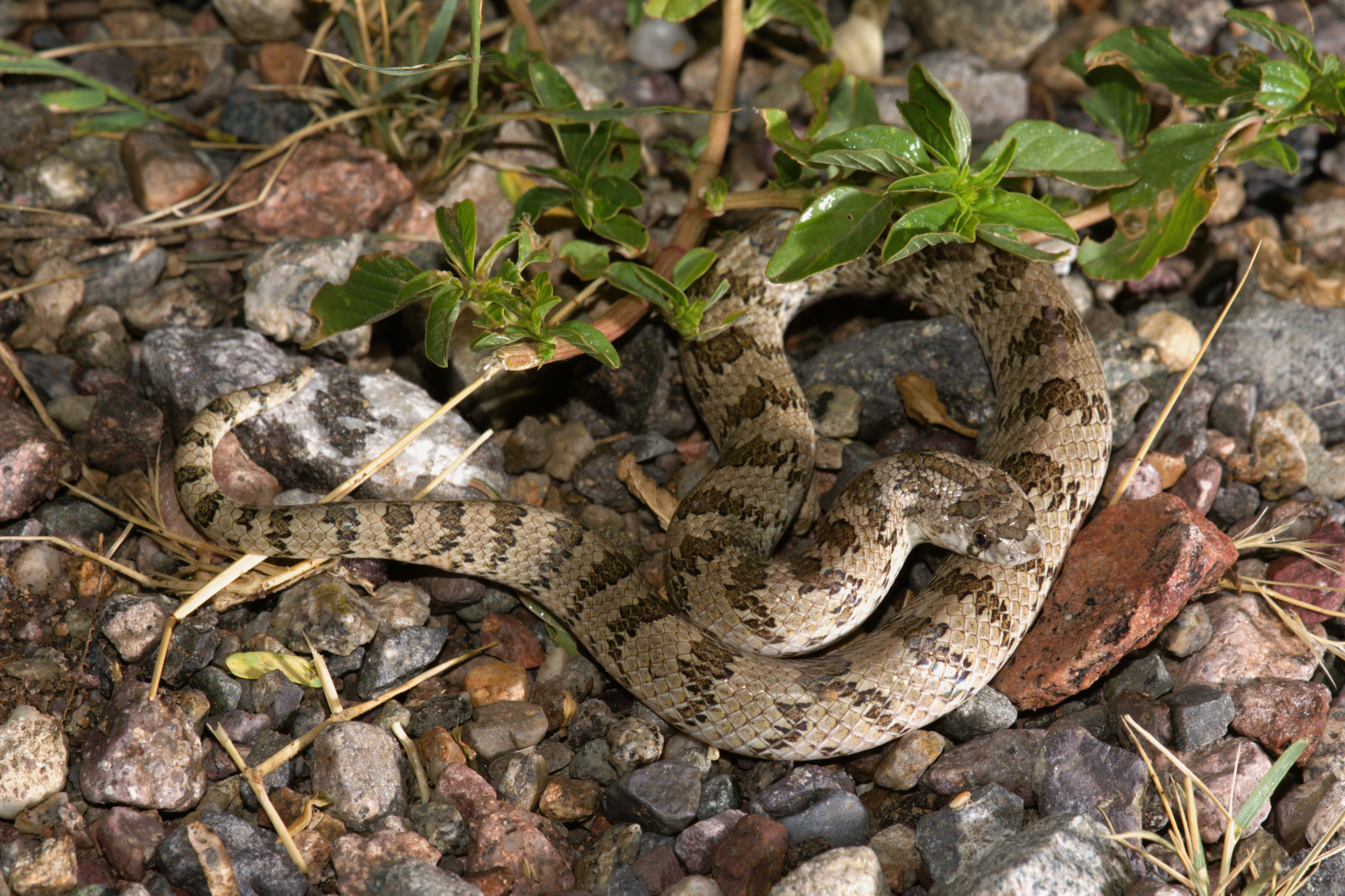

Conservation status
- Least Concern (IUCN 3.1)

- Secure (NatureServe)

Scientific classification
- Kingdom: Animalia
- Phylum: Chordata
- Class: Reptilia
- Order: Squamata
- Suborder: Serpentes
- Family: Colubridae
- Genus: Gyalopion
- Species: G. canum

Binomial name
- Gyalopion canum Cope, 1860
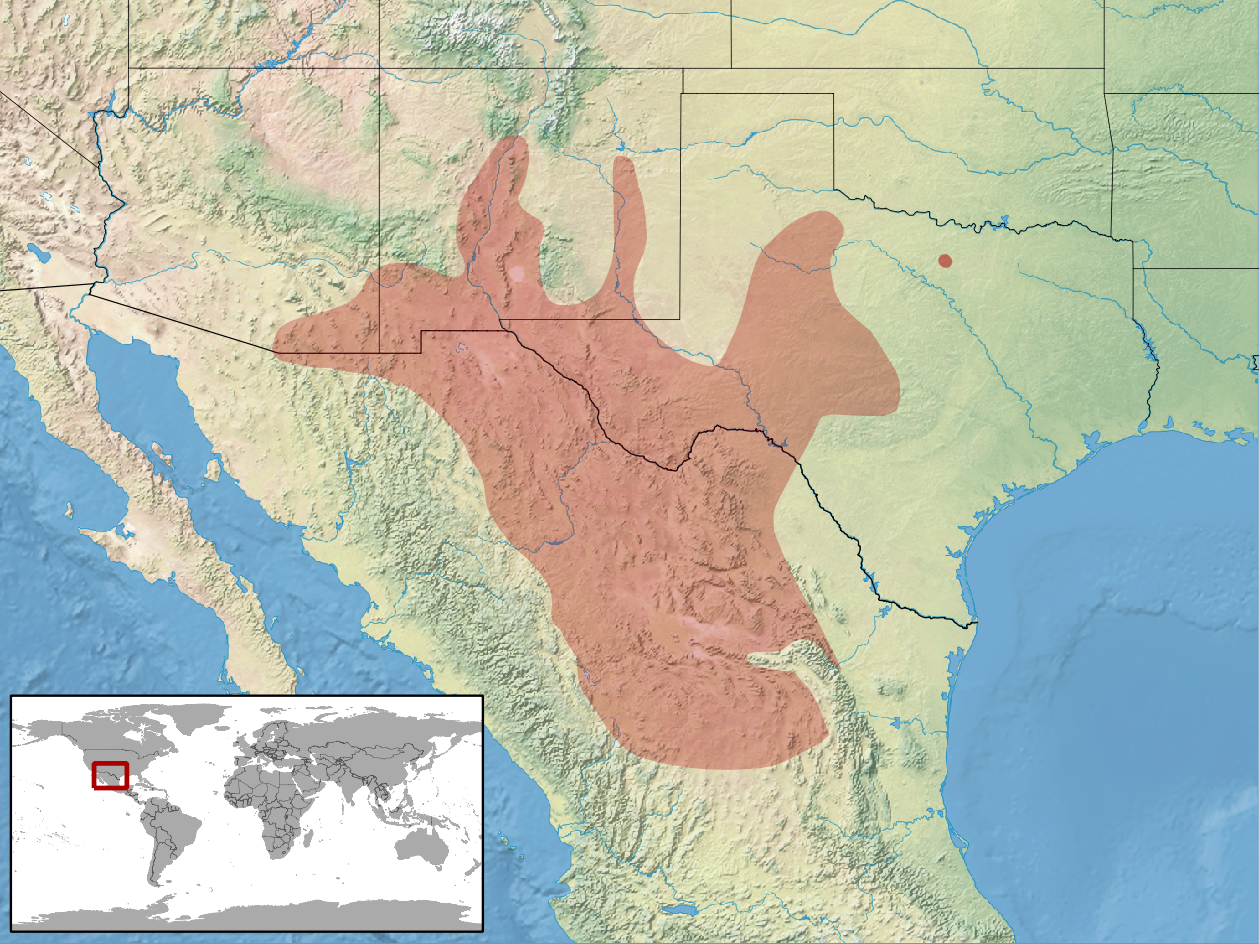

Synonyms
- Gyalopion canum Cope, 1860; Ficimia cana — Garman, 1883; Gyalopion canum — Stebbins, 1985

= Gyalopion canum =

Species of snake

Gyalopion canum, commonly known as the Western hooknose snake, is a species of small colubrid snake endemic to the deserts of the United States and Mexico. It is sometimes referred to as the Chihuahuan hook-nosed snake because it is commonly found in the Chihuahuan Desert.

== Taxonomy ==
The Western hooknose snake was originally described as a species new to science in 1860 by Edward Drinker Cope, who at that time named it Gyalopion canum. However, in 1883 Samuel Garman reassigned this species to the genus Ficimia, changing its scientific name to Ficimia cana. (Because Gyalopion is neuter, and Ficimia is feminine, the ending of the specific name had to be changed from "-um " to "-a "). After slightly more than 100 years, Robert C. Stebbins in 1985 returned this species to the genus Gyalopion, as Gyalopion canum, due to distinct morphological characteristics.

== Geographic range ==
G. canum is found in the United States, from western Texas to southeastern Arizona, and into northern and central Mexico.

== Description ==
The Western hooknose snake is a small species, growing to 36.5 cm (14 3/8 in) in total length (including tail). It is gray or grayish brown in color, with 25-48 dark brown or black blotches down the back, and a cream-colored underside. It has a slightly upturned snout, to which the common name, "hooknose", refers.

The smooth dorsal scales are arranged in 17 rows at midbody.

== Behavior ==
G. canum is a nocturnal burrower, most often found under rocks.

== Habitat ==
The Western hooknose snake prefers slightly sandy habitats, near a permanent water source.

== Diet ==
The diet of G. canum consists primarily of spiders and centipedes, but it will also eat small snakes and scorpions.

== Reproduction ==
The Western hooknose snake is oviparous. Sexually mature females may lay up to 5 eggs in June.

== Defense ==
One of the primary defensive behaviors of G. canum is to make a popping noise with its cloaca, i.e., farting. According to an article in the August, 2000 issue of Discover magazine, during a laboratory experiment carried out by Bruce Young, a morphologist at Lafayette College, the snakes only farted when they felt threatened, and some farted so energetically that they lifted themselves off the ground.

== Speed ==
Gyalopion canum is quick in short bursts or spurts.
