= Ficimia hardyi =

Conservation status
- Endangered (IUCN 3.1)

Scientific classification
- Kingdom: Animalia
- Phylum: Chordata
- Class: Reptilia
- Order: Squamata
- Suborder: Serpentes
- Family: Colubridae
- Genus: Ficimia
- Species: F. hardyi

Binomial name
- Ficimia hardyi Mendoza-Quijano & H.M. Smith, 1993
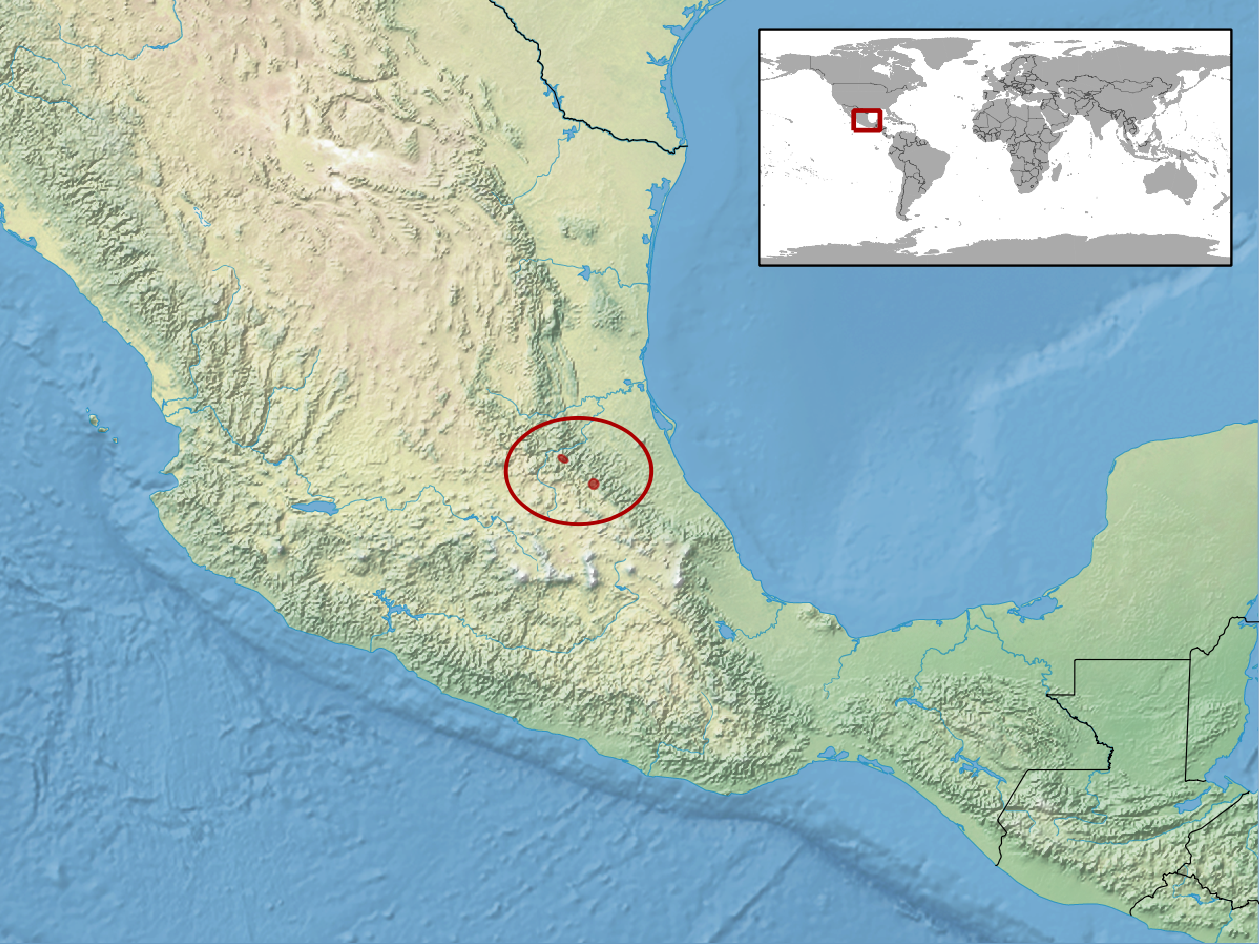

Species of snake

Ficimia hardyi, also known commonly as Hardy's hooknose snake, Hardy's hook-nosed snake, the Hidalgo hook-nosed snake, and nariz de gancho de Hardy in Mexican Spanish, is a species of nonvenomous snake in the family Colubridae. The species is endemic to Mexico.

== Etymology ==
The specific name, hardyi, is in honor of American herpetologist Laurence McNeil Hardy.

== Geographic range ==
F. hardyi is found in the Mexican states of Hidalgo, San Luis Potosí, and Tamaulipas.

== Habitat ==
The preferred natural habitats of F. hardyi are forest and shrubland, but it has also been found in cultivated agave fields.

== Description ==
The holotype of F. hardyi has a snout-to-vent length (SVL) of 28.2 cm (11.1 in), plus a tail length of 7.6 cm (3.0 in).

== Behavior ==
F. hardyi is terrestrial and fossorial.

== Reproduction ==
F. hardyi is oviparous.
