= Coat of arms of Tamaulipas =

Coat of Arms of Tamaulipas
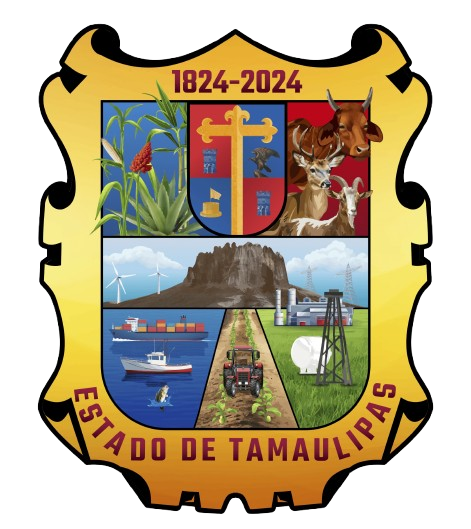

The Coat of arms of Tamaulipas (Spanish: Escudo de Tamaulipas) is the coat of arms of the Free and Sovereign State of Tamaulipas.

== Symbolism ==
It is made up of four sections framed in a golden yellow parchment with the design characteristics of the Coat of Arms that is attached to this Decree and that when facing forward is described as follows:

In the first section, corresponding to the left side and on a blue background, a corn plant, a sorghum plant with an orange panicle, an agave plant and a sugar cane plant appear in the following order, all in green as a symbol of the main sources that have given rise to the agricultural development of our entity. In the second section, corresponding to the upper central part, the Coat of Arms of Don José de Escandón y Heguera, Count of Sierra Gorda, appears as a testimony of recognition for his social, humanitarian and civilizing work, for which only the county shield will be identified with a yellow cross, removing the supports, the crest and the crown to be represented in the following description:

In the upper left part there is a blue tower on a red background.

In the upper right part a golden eagle on a blue background.

In the lower left part there is a golden cauldron with a red flag on a blue background.

In the lower right part there is a blue tower on a red background.

In the third section, corresponding to the upper right part, on a red background there is a dark brown Zebu bull from top to bottom, a cow of the same breed in ochre yellow, and a beige goat, indicating the livestock production of our state.

In the fourth section. In the lower part, on a sky blue background there is the characteristic Cerro del Bernal in brown, with a white cloud on each side of the upper part. In the lower left part there is a light gray shrimp boat and an orange fish in a dark blue sea, which identifies the exploitation and fishing industry of our state. In the lower part and in the center there is a white tractor in a beige field, furrowing the land as a testimony of development through the mechanization of the field.

At the bottom right, on a green background, there is a black oil tower and two white oil tanks, signifying the hydrocarbon potential and the technical capacity for refining them.

== History ==
This coat of arms was created between October 1749 and July 1751. It is guarded on its sides by two natives who serve as support. In the center of the natives is the quartered shield. First, silver, sable eagle spread out. Second, gules, silver castle. Third, sinople, silver castle. Fourth, south, gold cauldron with a gules band. Between the first and second quarters, gold cross. The shield is surmounted by a county crown. The motto of the shield says: Although rustic, these arms whose light has come from this cross and are of the lineage and house of Escandón.

The coat of arms was made thinking on the one hand of capturing the history of the state in 1939, which is why the coat of arms of Don José de Escandón y Helguera was included, as a testimony to his community and civilizing work and on the other, to represent abundance and wealth, both livestock, agricultural and industrial.

=== Historical coats ===
The symbol is used by all successive regimes in different forms.

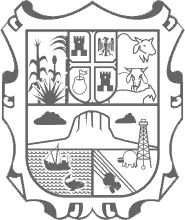
Coat of arms from 1979

Coat of arms from 1979 to 2023

== See also ==
- Tamaulipas
- Coat of arms of Mexico
