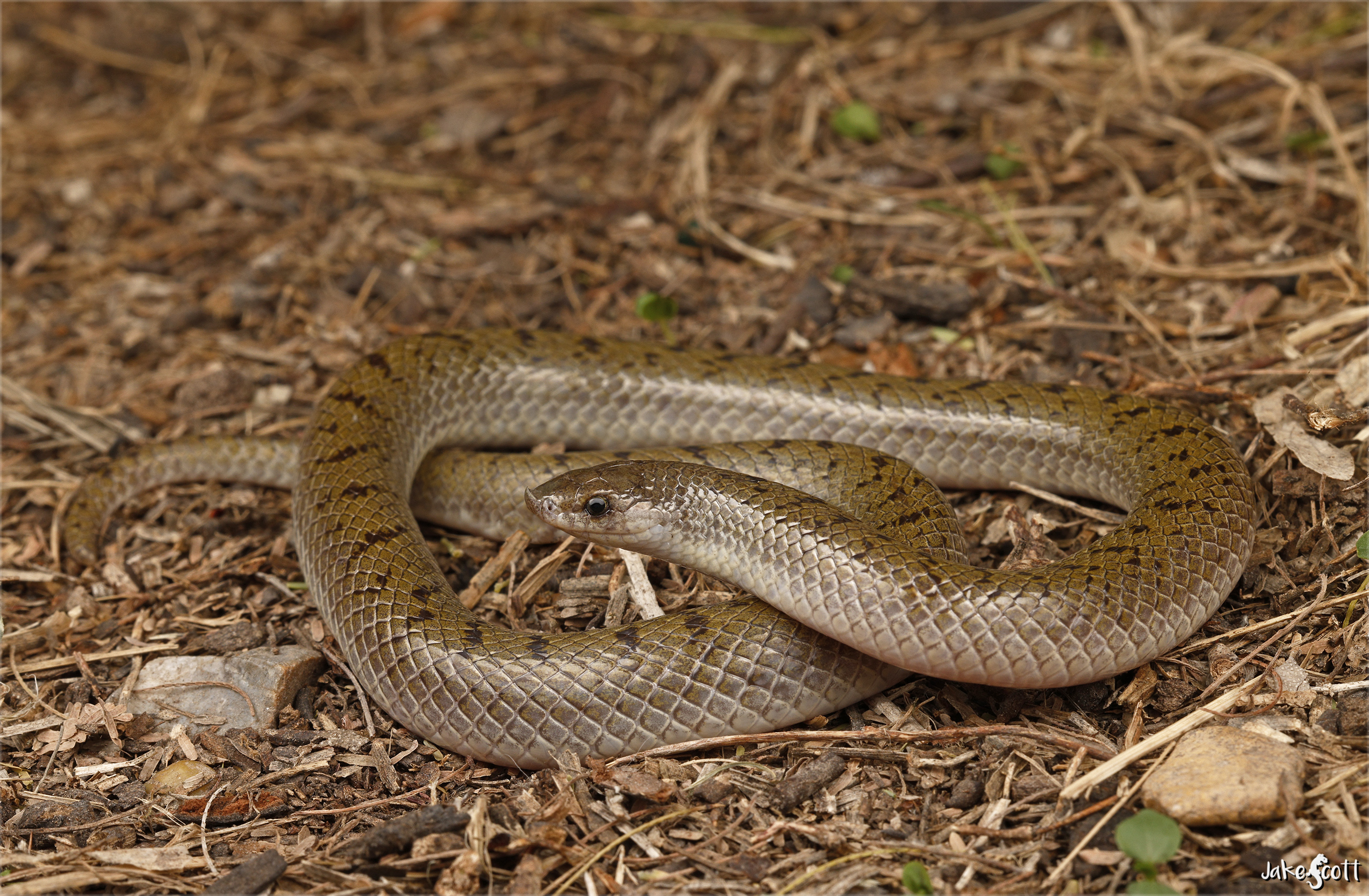

Conservation status
- Least Concern (IUCN 3.1)

- Apparently Secure (NatureServe)

Scientific classification
- Kingdom: Animalia
- Phylum: Chordata
- Class: Reptilia
- Order: Squamata
- Suborder: Serpentes
- Family: Colubridae
- Genus: Ficimia
- Species: F. streckeri

Binomial name
- Ficimia streckeri Taylor, 1931
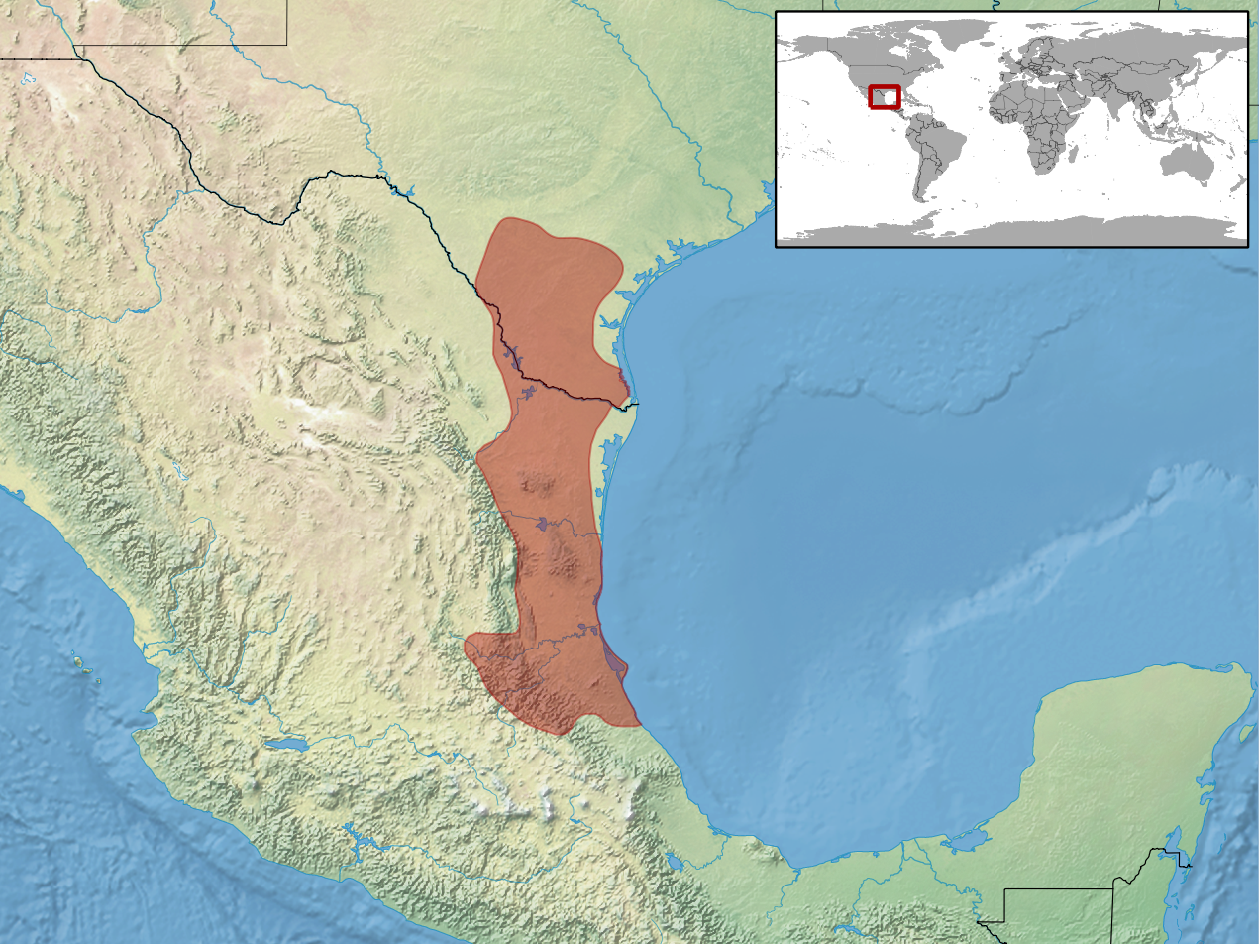

= Ficimia streckeri =

Species of snake

Ficimia streckeri, also commonly known as the Mexican hooknose snake, the Tamaulipan hooknose snake, and the Texas hook-nosed snake, is a small species of snake in the family Colubridae. The species is native to northeastern Mexico and adjacent southern Texas.

== Etymology ==
The specific name or epithet, streckeri, is in honor of the American naturalist John Kern Strecker Jr.

== Geographic range ==
F. streckeri is found primarily in the Mexican states of Hidalgo, Nuevo León, Puebla, eastern San Luis Potosí, and Tamaulipas, but its geographic range extends as far north as southern Texas in the United States.

== Description ==
The Mexican hooknose snake is usually 5 to 11 in (13 to 28 cm) in total length (including tail). H.M. Smith and Brodie (1982) report a maximum total length of 47.9 cm (almost 19 inches).

It is typically brown or gray in color, with as many as 60 brown or brown-green blotches down the back, which are elongated to almost appear as stripes. Its underside is white or cream-colored.

Its most distinctive feature is an upturned snout, much like hognose snakes, which gives it its common name. However, unlike hognose snakes, the Mexican hooknose snake has smooth dorsal scales. Also distinctive is the arrangement of the head shields. There are no internasals, and the rostral separates the prefrontals and contacts the frontal.

The smooth dorsal scales are arranged in 17 rows at midbody. The ventrals number 126–155, and the subcaudals number 28–41.

== Behavior ==
The Mexican hooknose snake is mostly nocturnal, and is a burrower. It is fairly slow-moving and harmless to humans.

== Diet ==
The diet of F. streckeri consists primarily of spiders and centipedes.

== Habitat ==
The Mexican hooknose snake inhabits woodlands along the Rio Grande river plain, near natural and man-made sources of water.

== Defense ==
The primary form of defense of F. streckeri is making a popping sound by expanding its cloaca when harassed or handled.

== Reproduction ==
The Mexican hooknose snake is oviparous.
