= Ficimia ruspator =

Conservation status
- Data Deficient (IUCN 3.1)

Scientific classification
- Kingdom: Animalia
- Phylum: Chordata
- Class: Reptilia
- Order: Squamata
- Suborder: Serpentes
- Family: Colubridae
- Genus: Ficimia
- Species: F. ruspator

Binomial name
- Ficimia ruspator H.M. Smith & Taylor, 1941
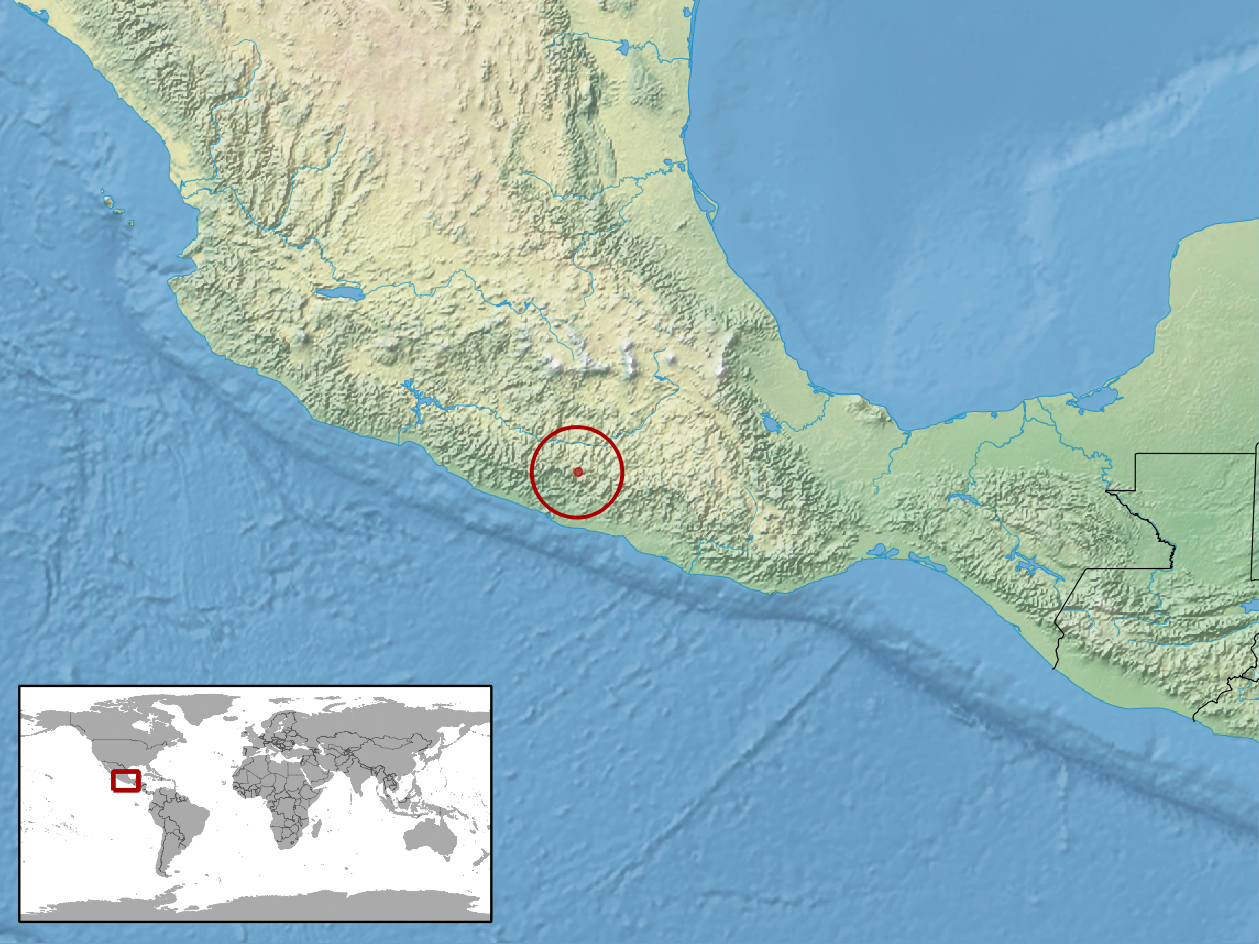

Species of snake

Ficimia ruspator, the Guerreran hook-nosed snake, is a species of non-venomous snake in the family Colubridae. The species is found in Mexico.
