= Ficimia variegata =

Conservation status
- Data Deficient (IUCN 3.1)

Scientific classification
- Kingdom: Animalia
- Phylum: Chordata
- Class: Reptilia
- Order: Squamata
- Suborder: Serpentes
- Family: Colubridae
- Genus: Ficimia
- Species: F. variegata

Binomial name
- Ficimia variegata (Günther, 1858)
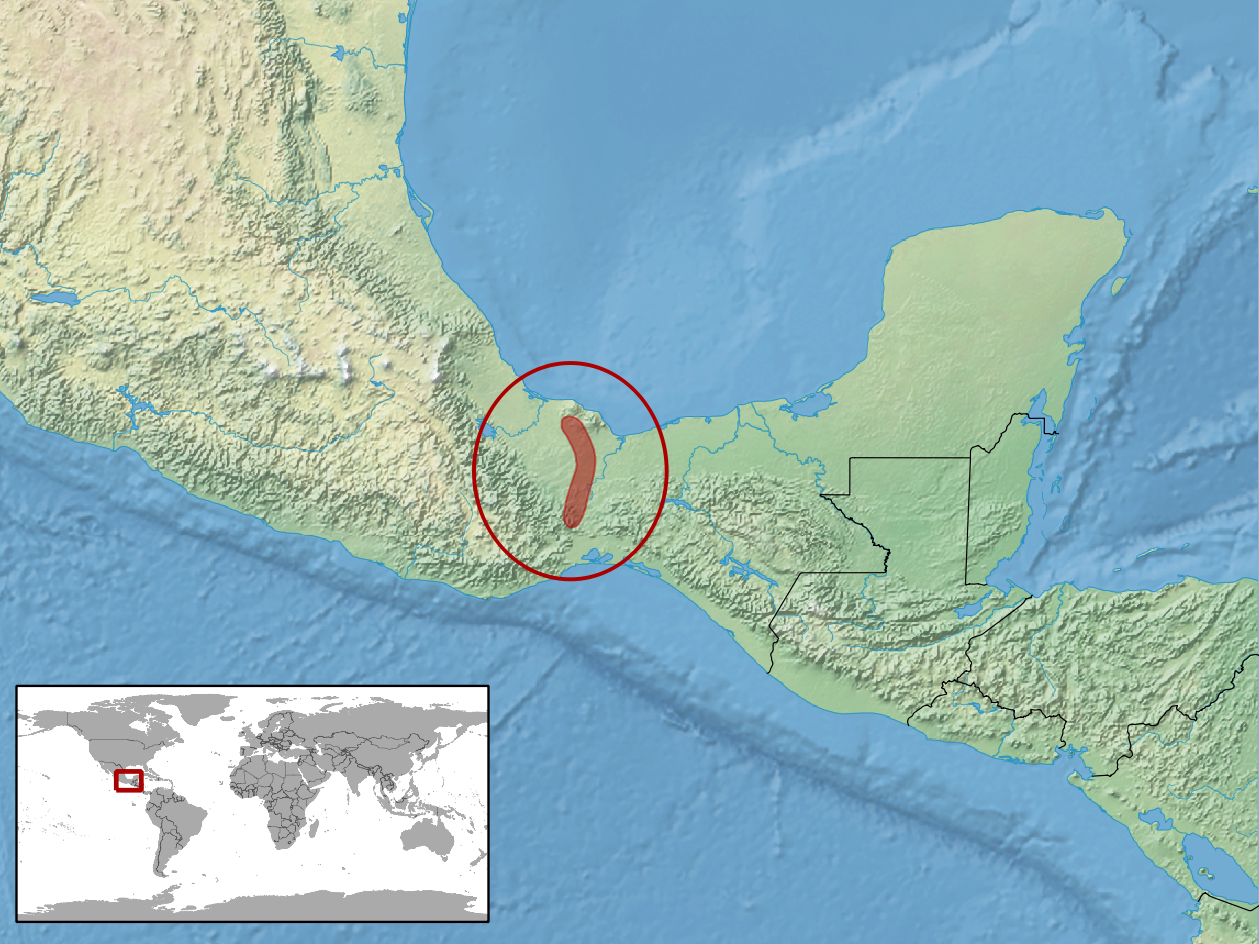

Species of snake

Ficimia variegata, the Tehuantepec hook-nosed snake, is a species of non-venomous snake in the family Colubridae. The species is found in Mexico.
