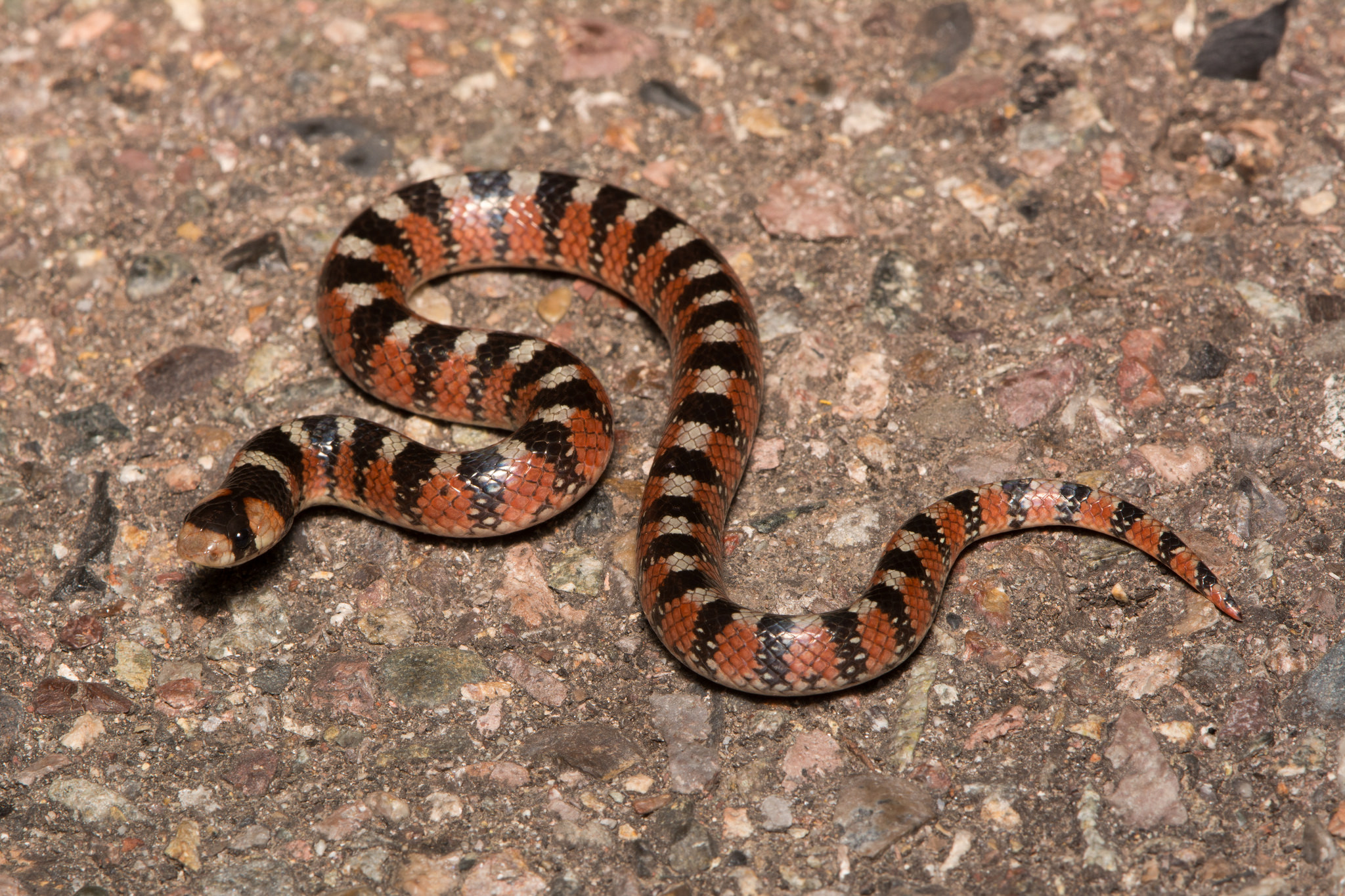

Scientific classification
- Domain: Eukaryota
- Kingdom: Animalia
- Phylum: Chordata
- Class: Reptilia
- Order: Squamata
- Suborder: Serpentes
- Family: Colubridae
- Subfamily: Colubrinae
- Genus: Gyalopion; Cope, 1860
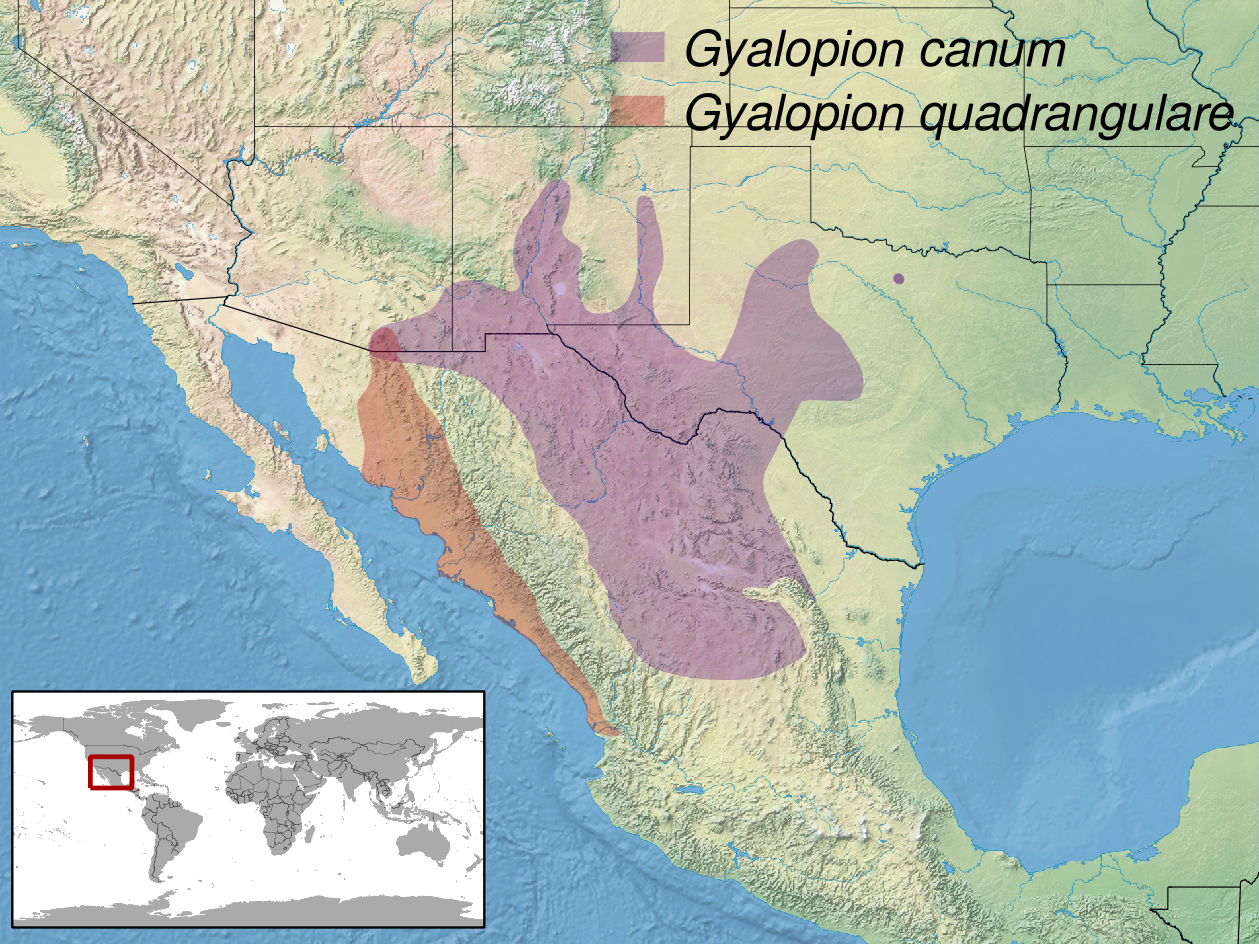

= Gyalopion =

Genus of snakes

Gyalopion is a genus of small nonvenomous colubrid snakes. Species in the genus Gyalopion are commonly referred to as hooknose snakes, and are native to the southwestern United States and Mexico.

== Taxonomy ==
The following species and subspecies are recognized:

- Gyalopion canum Cope, 1860 – western hook-nosed snake
- Gyalopion quadrangulare (Günther, 1893) – desert hook-nosed snake
  - Gyalopion quadrangulare desertorum (Taylor, 1936)
  - Gyalopion quadrangulare quadrangulare (Günther, 1893)

Nota bene: A binomial authority or trinomial authority in parentheses indicates that the species or subspecies was originally described in a genus other than Gyalopion.

== Geographic range ==
G. canum is found in the United States (Arizona, New Mexico, Texas), and in Mexico (Chihuahua, Coahuila, Durango, Jalisco, Michoacán, Nuevo León, San Luis Potosí, Sonora, Zacatecas).

G. quadrangulare is found in the United States (Arizona), and in Mexico (Sinaloa, Sonora).

== Habitat ==
Hooknose snakes prefer shortgrass prairie habitats.

== Description ==
Dorsally, the base color of hook-nosed snakes is light brown, which is overlaid with darker brown crossbands. The ventral color is white or cream-colored. The most distinguishing feature of hook-nosed snakes is an upturned snout, which has a concave rostral scale, as opposed to hognose snakes which have a keeled rostral scale. Species of Gyalopion rarely grow beyond 25.5 cm (10 inches) in total length (including tail).

== Behavior ==
Hooknose snakes are nocturnal and secretive snakes, generally found hiding under rocks, or buried in the soil.

== Diet ==
The primary diet of hook-nosed snakes consists of spiders and centipedes.

== Reproduction ==
Species in the genus Gyalopion are oviparous.
