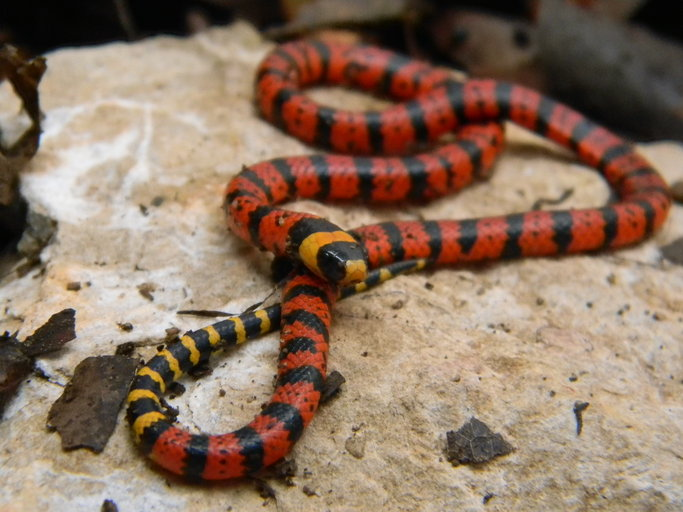

Conservation status
- Least Concern (IUCN 3.1)

Scientific classification
- Kingdom: Animalia
- Phylum: Chordata
- Class: Reptilia
- Order: Squamata
- Suborder: Serpentes
- Family: Elapidae
- Genus: Micrurus
- Species: M. diastema

Binomial name
- Micrurus diastema (A.M.C. Duméril, Bibron & A.H.A. Duméril, 1854)
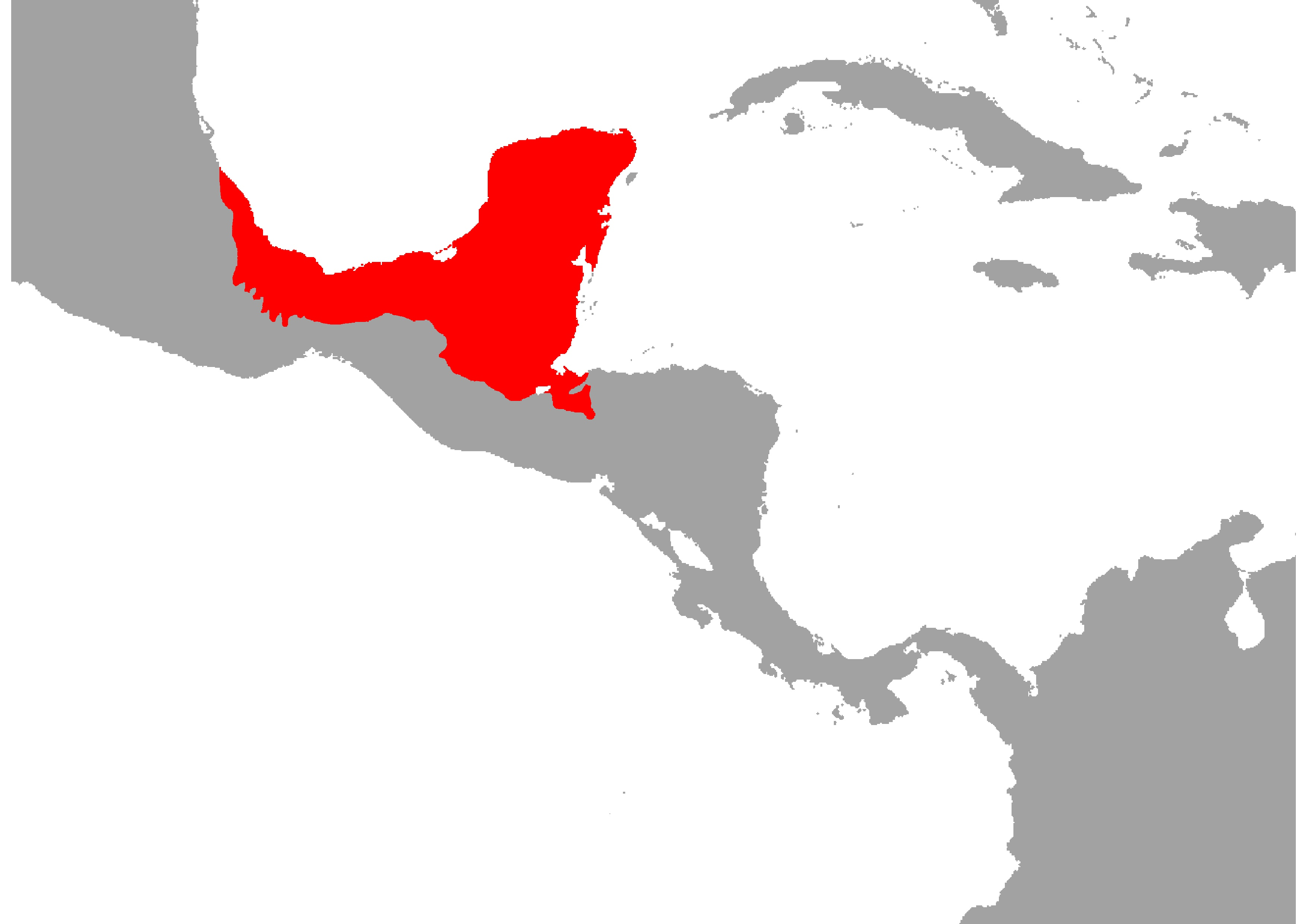

Synonyms
- Elaps diastema A.M.C. Duméril, Bibron & A.H.A. Duméril, 1854; Micrurus diastema — Schmidt, 1933

= Micrurus diastema =

Species of snake

Micrurus diastema, commonly known as the diastema coral snake, the variable coral snake, and coral diastema in Spanish, is a species of venomous snake in the family Elapidae. The species is native to southeastern Mexico and northern Central America. There are seven recognized subspecies.

== Geographic distribution ==
Micrurus diastema occurs in Belize, Guatemala, Honduras, and southeastern Mexico.

== Habitat ==
The preferred natural habitat of Micrurus diastema is tropical wet, moist, and dry forest from near sea level to 1,250 m (4,100 ft), but it tolerates habitat disturbance and is also found in agricultural areas.

== Behavior ==
Micrurus diastema is terrestrial.

== Reproduction ==
Micrurus diastema is oviparous.

== Subspecies ==
There are seven subspecies which are recognized as being valid, including the nominotypical subspecies.

- Micrurus diastema affinis (Jan, 1858)
- Micrurus diastema aglaeope (Cope, 1860)
- Micrurus diastema alienus (F. Werner, 1903)
- Micrurus diastema apiatus (Jan, 1858)
- Micrurus diastema diastema (A.M.C. Duméril, Bibron & A.H.A. Duméril, 1854)
- Micrurus diastema macdougalli Roze, 1967
- Micrurus diastema sapperi (F. Werner, 1903)

Nota bene: A trinomial authority in parentheses indicates that the subspecies was originally described in a genus other than Micrurus.

== Etymology ==
The subspecific name, macdougalli, is in honor of naturalist Thomas Baillie MacDougall (1896–1973).

The subspecific name, sapperi, is in honor of German explorer Karl Theodor Sapper.
