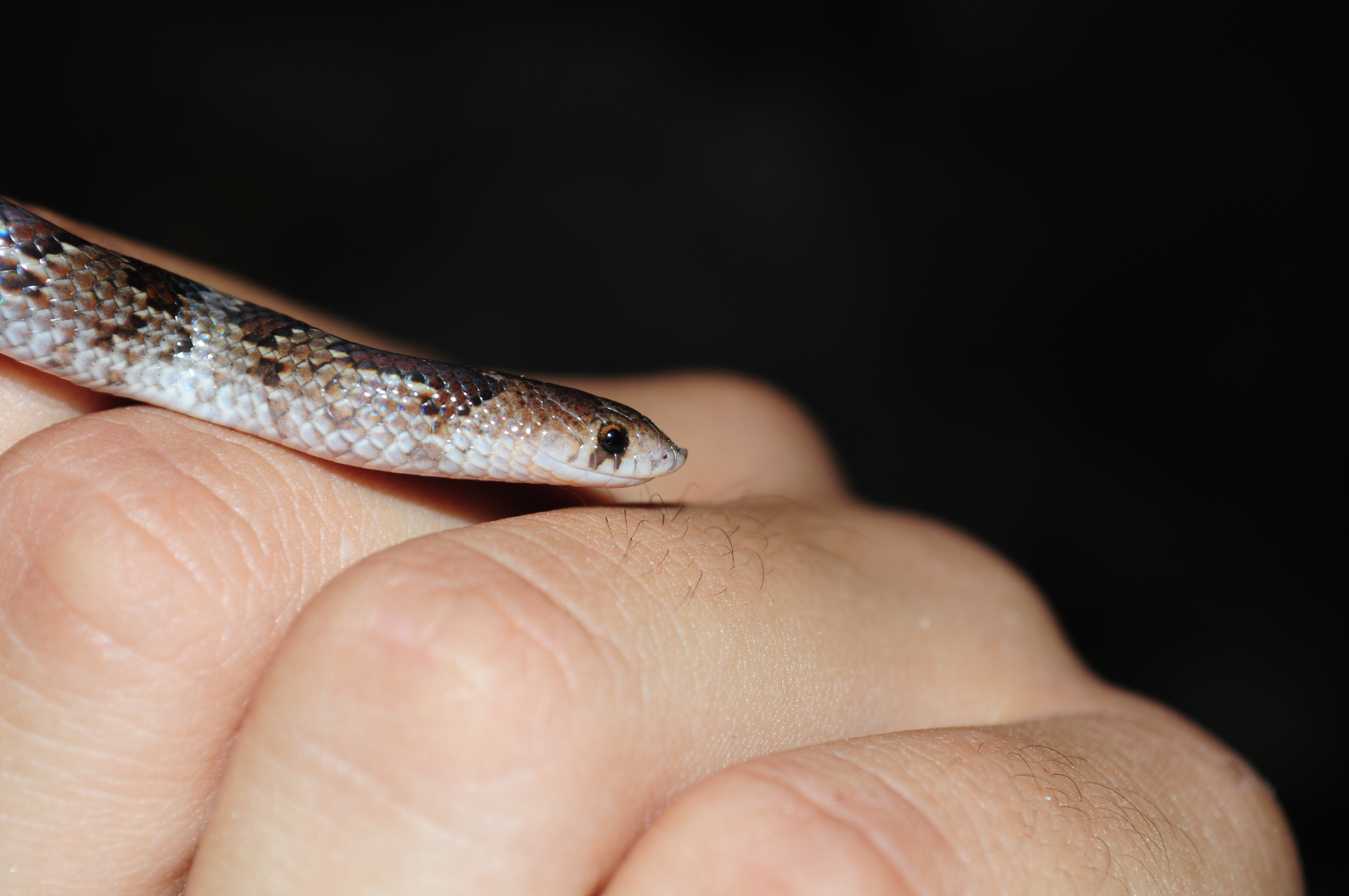
- Ficimia publia

Scientific classification
- Domain: Eukaryota
- Kingdom: Animalia
- Phylum: Chordata
- Class: Reptilia
- Order: Squamata
- Suborder: Serpentes
- Family: Colubridae
- Subfamily: Colubrinae
- Genus: Ficimia; Gray, 1849

Species
- See text

Synonyms
- Amblymetopon Günther, 1858; Gyalopion Cope, 1861

= Ficimia =

Genus of snakes

Ficimia is a genus of colubrid snakes commonly known as hooknose snakes or hook-nosed snakes, which are endemic to North America. There are seven species within the genus.

== Geographic range ==
Species of Ficimia are found in Mexico, in the United States in the southern tip of Texas, and as far south as Guatemala, Belize, and Honduras.

== Description ==
Hooknose snakes are typically gray or olive green in color, with brown or black blotching down the back, and a cream-colored underside. They grow to a total length of 5–11 in (13–28 cm) and have a distinct upturned snout, which is similar to that of hognose snakes (genus Heterodon), and is used to aid in burrowing in loose, sandy soil. The dorsal scales are smooth (keeled in Heterodon), and the anal plate is divided.

== Diet ==
Hook-nosed snakes feed primarily on spiders and centipedes.

== Species ==
The following seven species are recognized as being valid.

- Ficimia hardyi Mendoza-Quijano & H.M. Smith, 1993 – Hardy's hook-nosed snake
- Ficimia olivacea Gray, 1849 – Mexican hook-nosed snake
- Ficimia publia Cope, 1866 – blotched hook-nosed snake
- Ficimia ramirezi H.M. Smith & Langebartel, 1949 – Ramirez's hook-nosed snake
- Ficimia ruspator H.M. Smith & Taylor, 1941 – Guerreran hook-nosed snake
- Ficimia streckeri Taylor, 1941 – Tamaulipan hook-nosed snake
- Ficimia variegata (Günther, 1858) – Tehuantepec hook-nosed snake
