= Tamaulipas =

State of Mexico

- State
- Free and Sovereign State of Tamaulipas; Libre y Soberano Estado de Tamaulipas (Spanish)
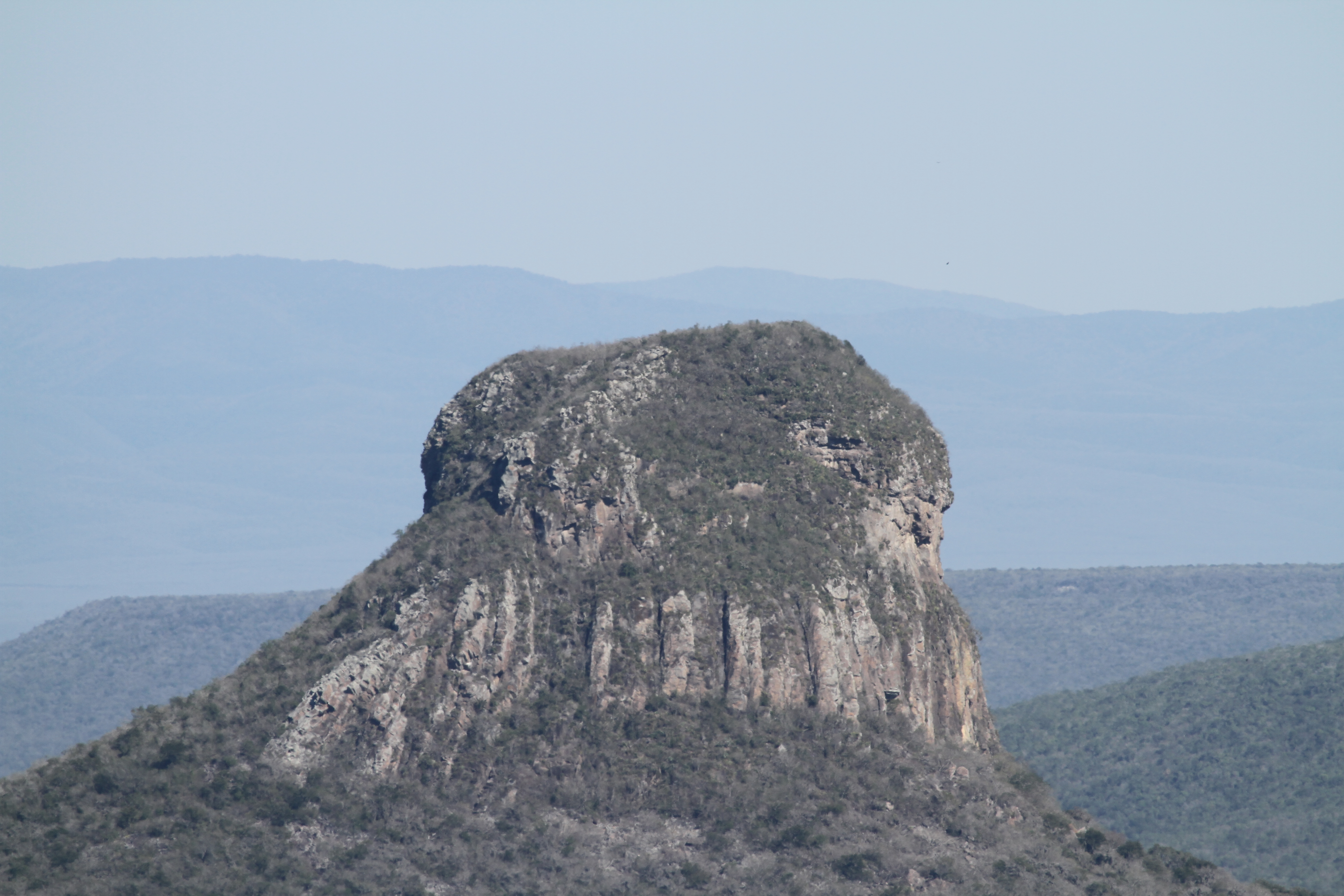
- Cerro del Bernal in southern Tamaulipas

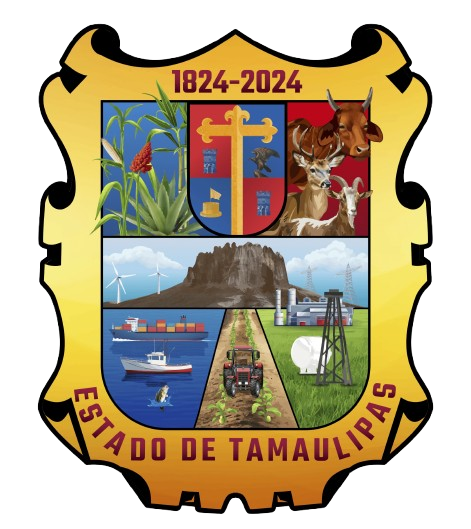
- Coat of arms
- Anthem: Himno de Tamaulipas
- State of Tamaulipas within Mexico
- Coordinates: 24°17′N 98°34′W
- Country: Mexico
- Capital: Ciudad Victoria
- Largest city: Reynosa
- Largest metro: Greater Tampico
- Municipalities: 43
- Admission: February 7, 1824
- Order: 14th

Government
  - Governor: Américo Villarreal Anaya
  - Senators: Maria Guadalupe Covarrubias Cervantes; José Ramón Gómez Leal; Ismael García Cabeza de Vaca
  - Deputies: Federal Deputies: • Ana Laura Huerta Valdovinos (1st); • Olga Juliana Elizondo Guerra (2nd); • Juan González Lima (3rd); • Elva Agustina Vigil Hernández (4th); • Oscar de Jesús Almaraz Smer (5th); • Vicente Javier Verástegui Ostos (6th); • Erasmo González Robledo (7th); • Rosa María González Azcárraga (8th); • Claudia Alejandra Hernández Sáenz (9th)

Area
  - Total: 80,249 km^{2} (30,984 sq mi)
- Ranked 6th
- Highest elevation: 3,664 m (12,021 ft)

Population (2020)
  - Total: 3,527,735
  - Rank: 14th
  - Density: 43.960/km^{2} (113.86/sq mi)
  - Rank: 21st
- Demonym: Tamaulipeco (a)

GDP
  - Total: MXN 842 billion (US$41.9 billion) (2022)
  - Per capita: (US$11,674) (2022)
- Time zone: UTC−06:00 (Zona Centro)
  - Summer (DST): UTC−05:00 (DST)
- Postal code: 87–89
- Area code: Area codes 1 and 2: • 482; • 831; • 832; • 833; • 834; • 835; • 836; • 841; • 867; • 868; • 891; • 894; • 897; • 899
- ISO 3166 code: MX-TAM
- HDI: ▲0.807 very high Ranked 11th of 32
- Website: tamaulipas.gob.mx

Tamaulipas, (Note: Spanish pronunciation: [tamauˈlipas]) officially the Free and Sovereign State of Tamaulipas, (Note: Spanish: Estado Libre y Soberano de Tamaulipas) is a state in Mexico; it is one of the 31 states which, along with Mexico City, comprise the 32 federated entities of Mexico. It is divided into 43 municipalities.

It is located in northeast Mexico and is bordered by the states of Nuevo León to the west, San Luis Potosí to the southwest, and Veracruz to the southeast. To the north, it has a 370 km (230 mi) stretch of the U.S.–Mexico border with the state of Texas, and to the east it is bordered by the Gulf of Mexico. In addition to the capital city, Ciudad Victoria, the state's largest cities include Reynosa, Matamoros, Nuevo Laredo, Tampico, and Mante.

== Etymology ==
The name Tamaulipas is derived from Tamaholipa, a Huastec term in which the tam- prefix signifies "place (where)". No scholarly agreement exists on the meaning of holipa, but "high hills" is a common interpretation. Another explanation of the state name is that it is derived from Ta ma ho'lipam ("place where they pray a lot"), referring to the Lipan Apache people.

== History ==
The area known as Tamaulipas has been inhabited for at least 8,000 years. Several different cultures (north coastal, south coastal, lowlands, and mountains) have come and gone during that period.

Tamaulipas was originally populated by the nomad Chichimec and sedentary Huastec, in addition to non-Chichimec hunter-gatherer and fishing tribes.

In the middle of the 18th century, Nuevo Santander, the area where South Texas and the State of Tamaulipas currently hold, was populated by multiple tribes. In the Southwest, along the Sierra Madre, were the Pisones, Siguillones, Janambres, and Pames. Just North of Soto la Marina were the Aracates, Maratines, and Damiches. In the Sierra of Tamaulipa Oriental, were the Anancanaes, Mariguanes, Monanas, Palalguepes, Pasitas, Simariguanes, Verjaranos. In the valleys of Tamaulipa Oriental, were the Aribay, Tagualitos, Comecamotes, Aracates, Tagualitos, Inapanames, and Tumapacanes. The northern part of these sierra was the home of the Canaines, Borrados, Guijolotes, and Cadimas. On the coast between Soto la Marina and Tampico, were the Anancana, Aretines, Carimariguayes, Carimariguanes, Cataicanes, Mapulcana, Moraleños, Panguayes, and Zapoteros. Southwest of Tamaulipa Occidental were ther Tamaulipecos and Malincheños. North of the Rio Grande and south of the Nueces river, were the Pintos, Comecrudos, Texedenos, Quinicuanes, and two of the most famous, the Comanches and the Apaches.

=== Spanish era ===
A gradual process was needed for Spain to subjugate the inhabitants of Tamaulipas in the 16th and 17th centuries. The first permanent Spanish settlement in the area was Tampico in 1554. Further settlement was done by Franciscan missionaries; widespread cattle and sheep ranching by the Spanish bolstered the area's economy while forcing native populations from their original lands. Repeated indigenous rebellions kept the area unstable and weakened colonial interest in the region. What is now Tamaulipas was first incorporated as a separate province of New Spain in 1746 with the name Nuevo Santander. The local government capital during this time moved from Santander to San Carlos, and finally to Aguayo. The territory of this time spanned from the San Antonio River to the northeast to the Gulf of Mexico, then south to the Pánuco River near Tampico and west to the Sierra Madre Mountains. The area became a haven for rebellious Indians who fled there after increased Spanish settlements in Nuevo León and Coahuila.

In 1784 Nuevo Santander (Tamaulipas) led by Escandón, annexed San Antonio de los Llanos and its dependencies on the Purificación lagoon together with a certain number of ranches on the right bank of the Río Grande that belonged to Nuevo León. New settlements were then founded and the line of towns along the Rio Grande would later be dubbed the "villas del norte", or northern towns (Laredo, Revilla, Guerrero, Mier, Camargo, and Reynosa) which were established as a key part of Escandón's plan for the pacification and colonization of the province. These settlements, from Laredo to Reynosa, served as a defensive line for larger centers of population in the Mexican interior. Moreover, the villas functioned as a means to introduce Spanish "civilization" to the indigenous groups of the area. The Tamaulipas-Nuevo Leon border likely runs along old Mesquite Posts.

In the mid-17th century, various Apache bands from the Southern Plains, after acquiring horses from Europeans in New Mexico, moved southeastward into the Edwards Plateau, displacing the native hunting and gathering groups. One of these groups was known as Lipan (see Hodge 1907 Vol. I:769 for a confusing list of synonyms). After 1750, when most Apache groups of the Central Texas highlands were displaced by Comanche and moved into the coastal plain of southern Texas, the Europeans of the San Antonio area began referring to all Apache groups in southern Texas as Lipan or Lipan Apache.

Many Indian groups of missions in southern Texas and northeastern Mexico had recently been displaced from their territory through the southward push by the Lipan Apaches and were still hostile toward Apaches, linking arms with the local Spanish authorities against their common foe.

By 1790, Europeans turned their attention from the aboriginal groups and focused on containing the Apache invaders. In northeastern Coahuila and adjacent Texas, Spanish and Apache displacements created an unusual ethnic mix. Here, the local Indians mixed with displaced groups from Coahuila and Chihuahua and Texas. Some groups, to escape the pressure, combined and migrated north into the Central Texas highlands.

=== Independent Mexico ===
In 1824, after the Mexican War of Independence from Spain, and the fall of the Mexican Empire, Tamaulipas was one of the 19 founder states of the new United Mexican States. Slavery was formally abolished by the 1824 Constitution. During the fights between centralists and federalists that after independence, the successful Texas Revolution led to the creation of the Republic of Texas in 1836. The new republic claimed as part of its territory northern Tamaulipas.

Tamaulipas in Mexico, 1824

In 1840, it became a part of the short-lived Republic of the Rio Grande. In 1848, after the Mexican–American War, Tamaulipas lost more than a quarter of its territory via the Treaty of Guadalupe-Hidalgo. American president James K. Polk had desired to annex Mexican territory as far south as Tampico although his negotiator Nicholas Trist disregarded this and settled on a border with Texas on the Rio Grande. Its capital was kept at Aguayo, which later was renamed Ciudad Victoria in honor of Guadalupe Victoria, first President of Mexico.

In the wake of the war, Tamaulipas remained an object of interest to American expansionists. The climate was considered suitable for the spread of slavery by Southerners who desired the admission of new territory to shift the balance in Congress back towards the slave states. Senator Albert Gallatin Brown declared "I want Tamaulipas, Potosi, and one or two other Mexican states; and I want them all for the same reason – for the plantation and spreading of slavery". In the 1850s José María Jesús Carbajal led several incursions into Tamaulipas before being indicted for violating the Neutrality Act. Filibustering efforts were also directed towards Cuba with the Lopez Expedition, which was desired for the same reason as Tamaulipas.

The French occupation and reign of Emperor Maximilian during the 1860s was difficult for Tamaulipas, at least on the borders and in the city of Tampico. Portions of Tamaulipas supported the republican forces led by President Benito Juarez in resisting the French, especially in the north. Two years after French occupation began, Tamaulipas as a state finally acceded to Maximilian's rule, and the last French soldiers left the state in 1866, leading up to Maximilian's execution and fall of the Second Mexican Empire in 1867.

However, the years after Maximilian's defeat were ones of rebuilding and great growth in Tamaulipas. International trade began to blossom, especially with the coming of the railroad to Tampico, which was developing as not only a port city but also as an industrial and commercial center. The railroad allowed goods to flow quickly from the mines and cities of the interior and the Texas border to Tampico for processing and shipment. This, in turn, caused significant growth in towns such as Matamoros and Nuevo Laredo.

Since the revolution of 1910, successive governments have dedicated themselves to building industry and infrastructure in Tamaulipas, including communications and educational systems. Norberto Treviño Zapata founded the state university system, as well as reformed the state oil industry. Marte Gómez provided increased farm sizes for private family farmers. And more recently, Emilio Martínez Manautou led industrial growth. Lately, a push has been to strengthen fishing, including efforts to increase the price of fish and shellfish on the international market.

During the 1970s, Colombia was experiencing the Colombian Conflict, leading to the rise of illicit criminal organizations like the Cali Cartel and Medellín Cartel led by drug traffickers like Pablo Escobar and Fabio Ochoa Vásquez. In Mexico, there had already existed various illicit organizations doing drug trafficking like the Gulf Cartel, Milenio Cartel, Juaréz Cartel, Guadalajara Cartel, and a new group of vigilante drug traffickers called La Familia Michoacana. The Gulf Cartel was in charge of the State of Tamaulipas and other gulf coast states, leading to the drug trafficking rates going high in the 1990s. Around that time, a group of defectors from the Mexican Special Forces that participated in the Chiapas conflict defected as Osiel Cárdenas Guillén made them promises that they would receive better wages if they worked as the enforcer group of the Gulf Cartel called Los Zetas. They did incursions in states like Michoacán and merged La Familia Michoacana as an enforcer group from 2004 to 2006. In 2006, their crimes resulted in the Mexican drug war and Joint Operation Nuevo León-Tamaulipas.

== Geography ==
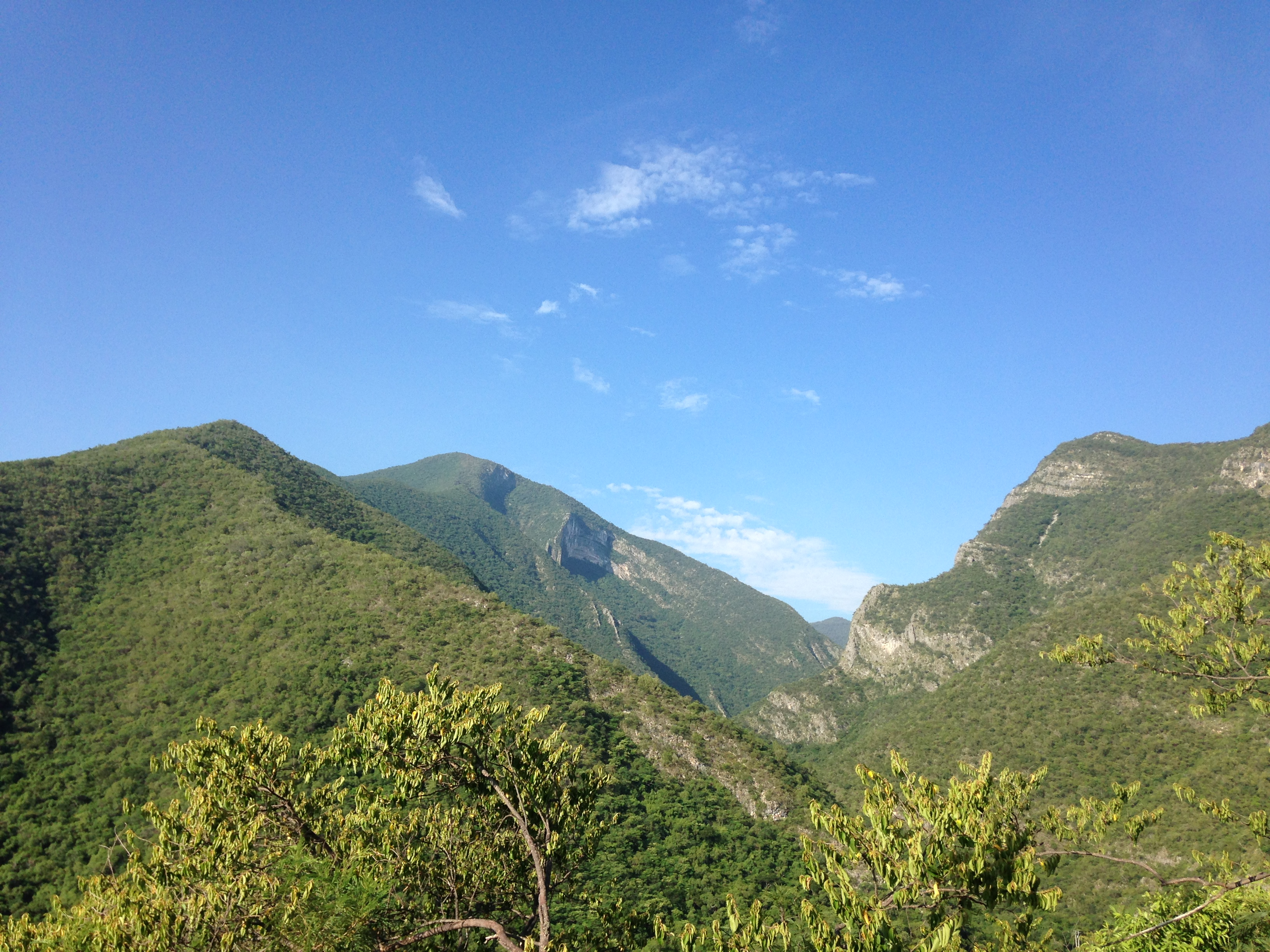
Sierra Madre Oriental

The Tropic of Cancer crosses the southern part of the municipality of Victoria. The coastal plains along the Gulf have a large presence in the state, whereas inland the landscape is adorned by cactus species and pasture. Predominant fauna in the region include the cougar (Puma concolor), long-tailed weasel (Mustela frenata), ocelot (Leopardus pardalis), American badger (Taxidea taxus), North American beaver (Castor canadensis), plain chachalaca (Ortalis vetula) and quail.

In the western part of the state, the Sierra Madre Oriental displays warm valleys and high sierras with peaks reaching 3,280 m (10,760 ft) in the Pedragoso Sierra; 3,240 m (10,630 ft) in the Borregos Sierra; 3,220 m (10,560 ft) in La Gloria Sierra; 3,180 m (10,430 ft) in Cerro el Nacimiento; and 3,000 m (9,800 ft) above sea level in the Sierra el Pinal. The Sierra de Tamaulipas and the Sierra de San Carlos are isolated mountain ranges in eastern Tamaulipas.

In terms of hydrology, the Bravo, Purificacion, and Guayalejo Rivers flow into the Gulf of Mexico after crossing the state from the western inland. On their way, their basins and zones of influence naturally correspond to the areas destined for agricultural use. The Rio Grande, known to Mexicans as the Río Bravo, represents the northern frontier shared with the United States. One of the tributaries of this natural border, the San Juan River, feeds the Marte R. Gómez Dam. Agricultural and cattle-raising activities are served by 14 other dams across the state, with a total capacity of 7,500 million m^{3} (260 billion cu ft) of water.

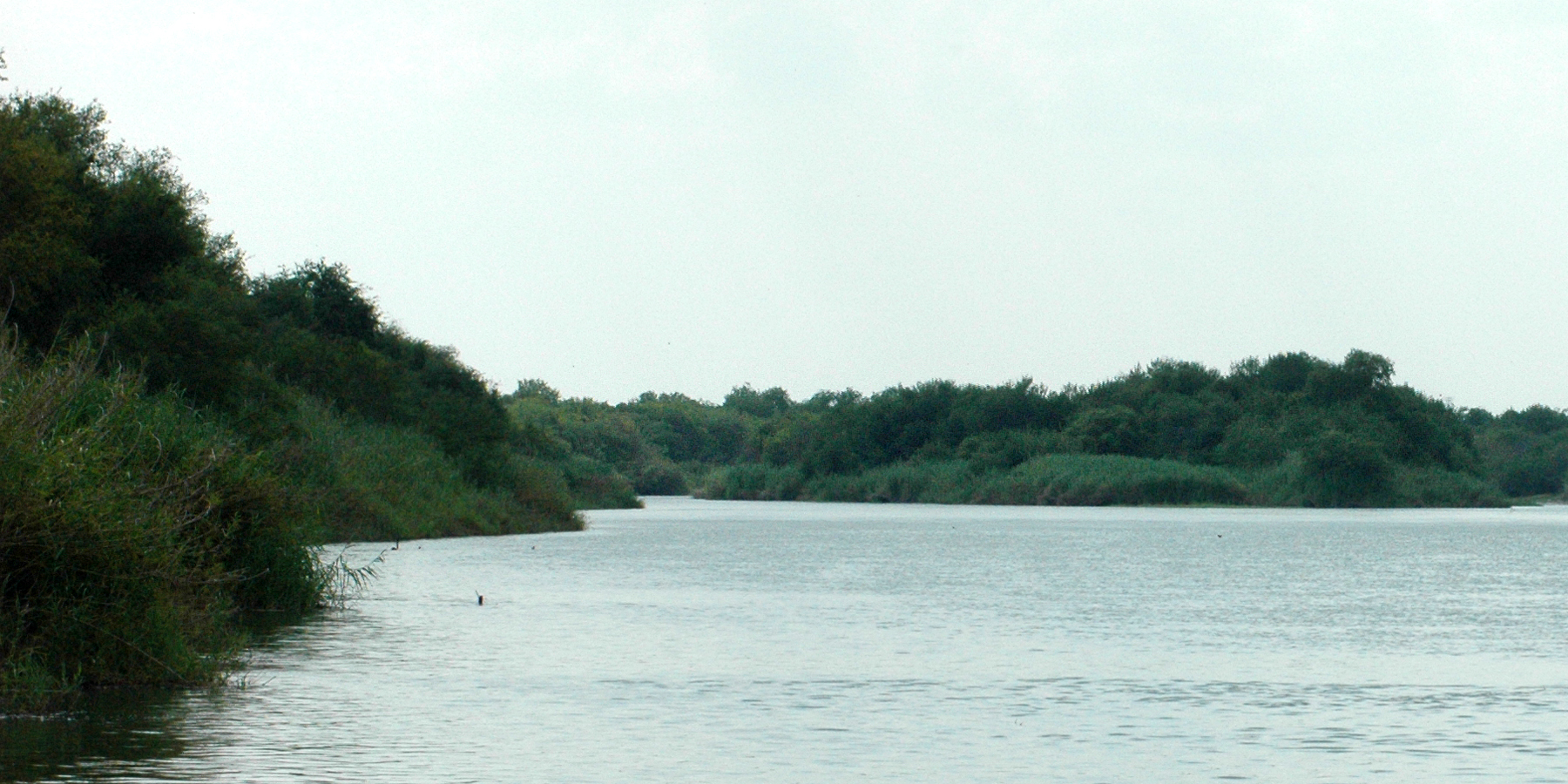
Rio Grande c. 4.8 kilometres (3 mi) southeast of Falcon Reservoir, Municipality of Mier, Tamaulipas, Mexico (August 2007)

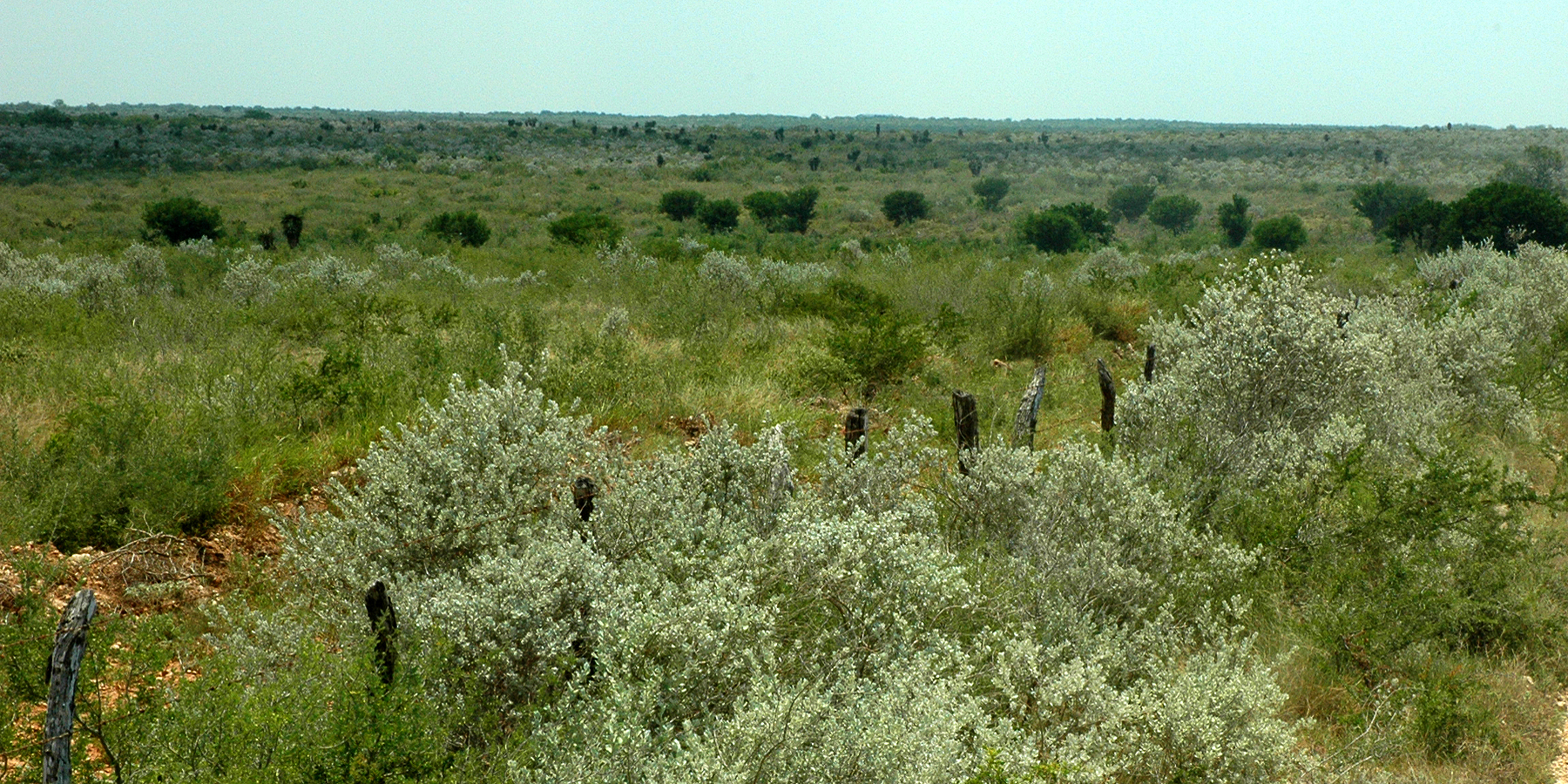
Thornscrub south of Reynosa, Municipality of Reynosa, Tamaulipas, Mexico (August 2007)

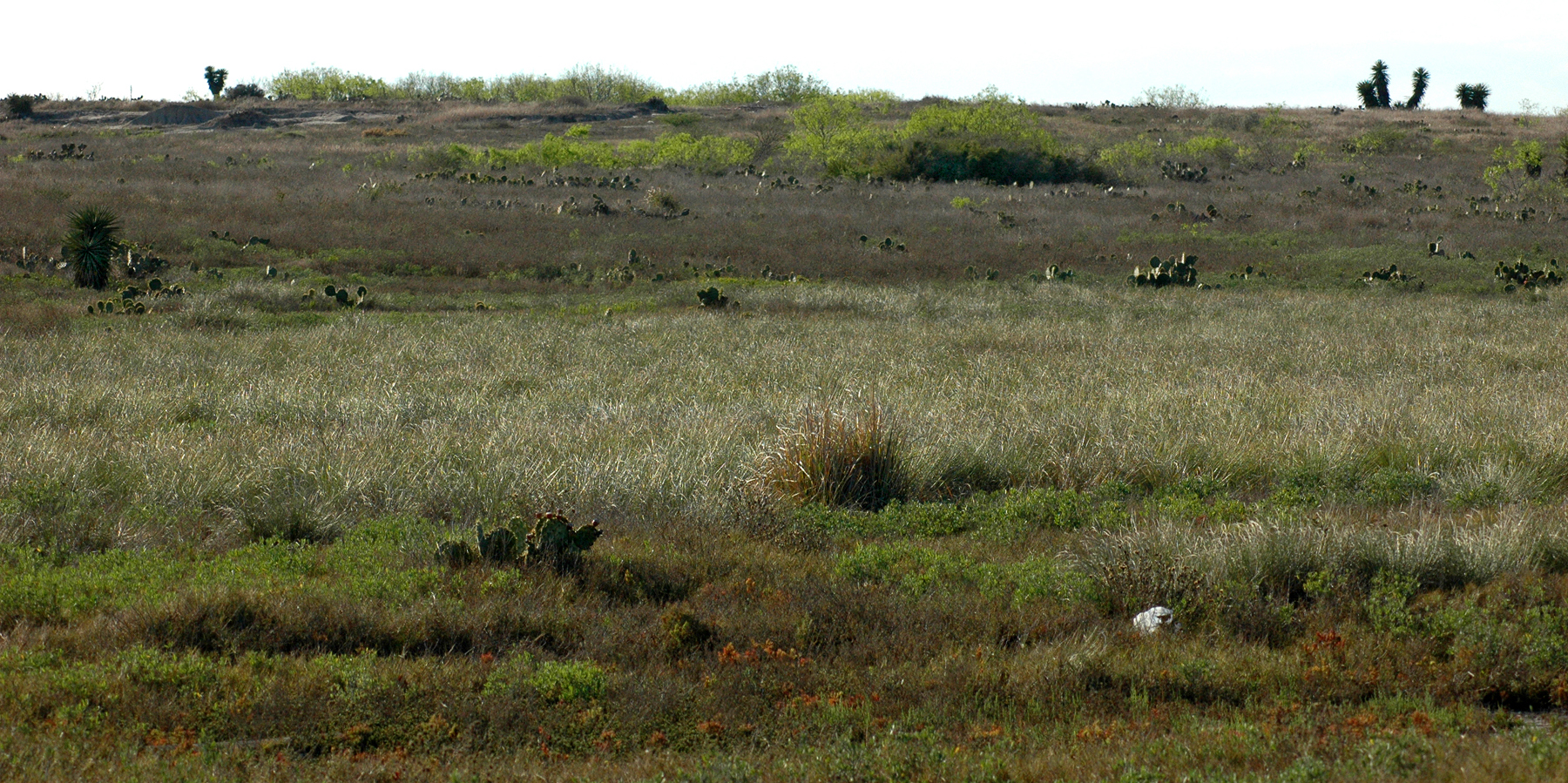
Grassland habitat on the road to Mezquital, Municipality of Matamoros, Tamaulipas, Mexico (March 2009)

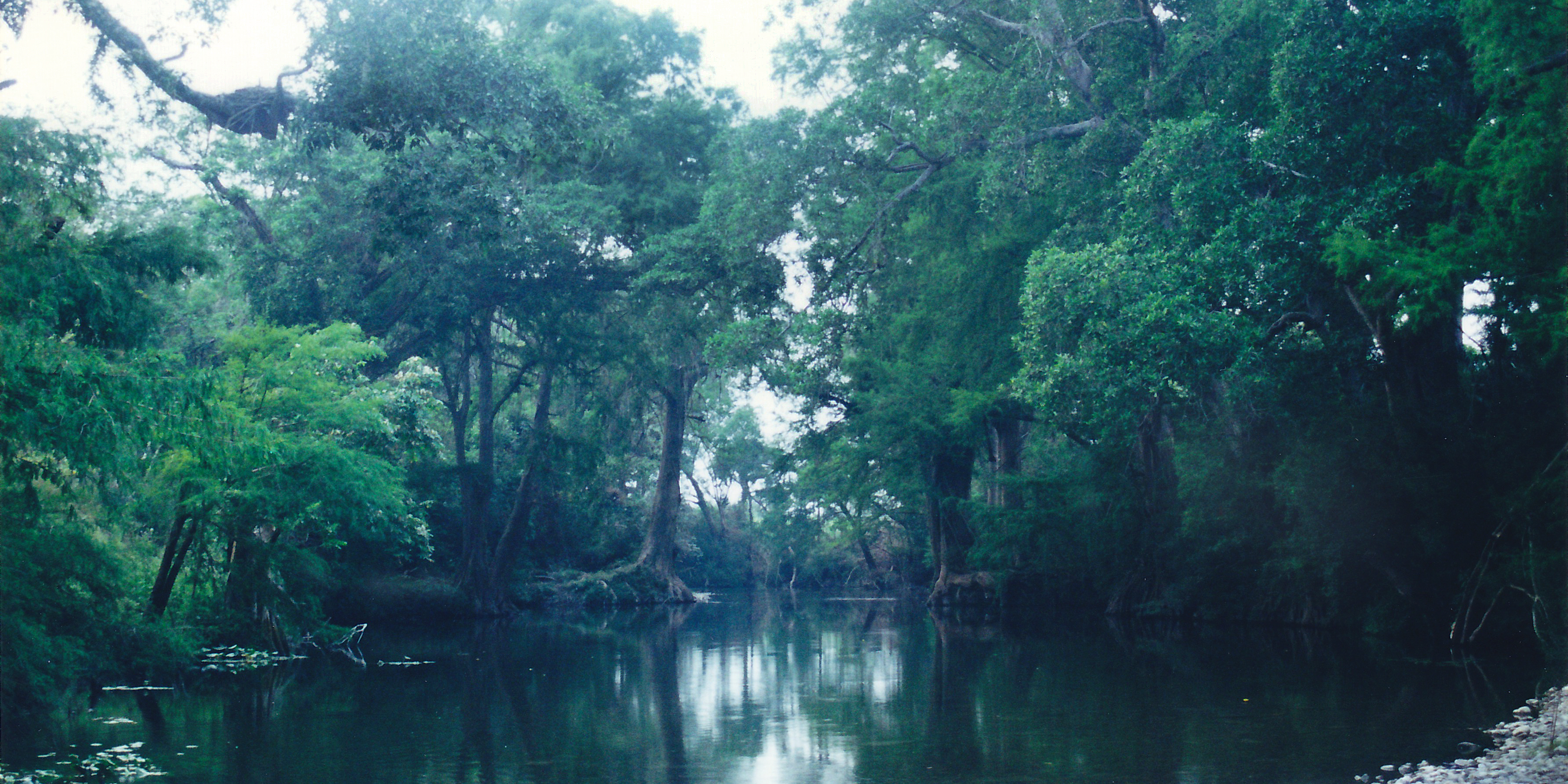
Dawn on the Rio Sabinas near Highway 85, Municipality of Gómez Farías, Tamaulipas, Mexico (April 2001)

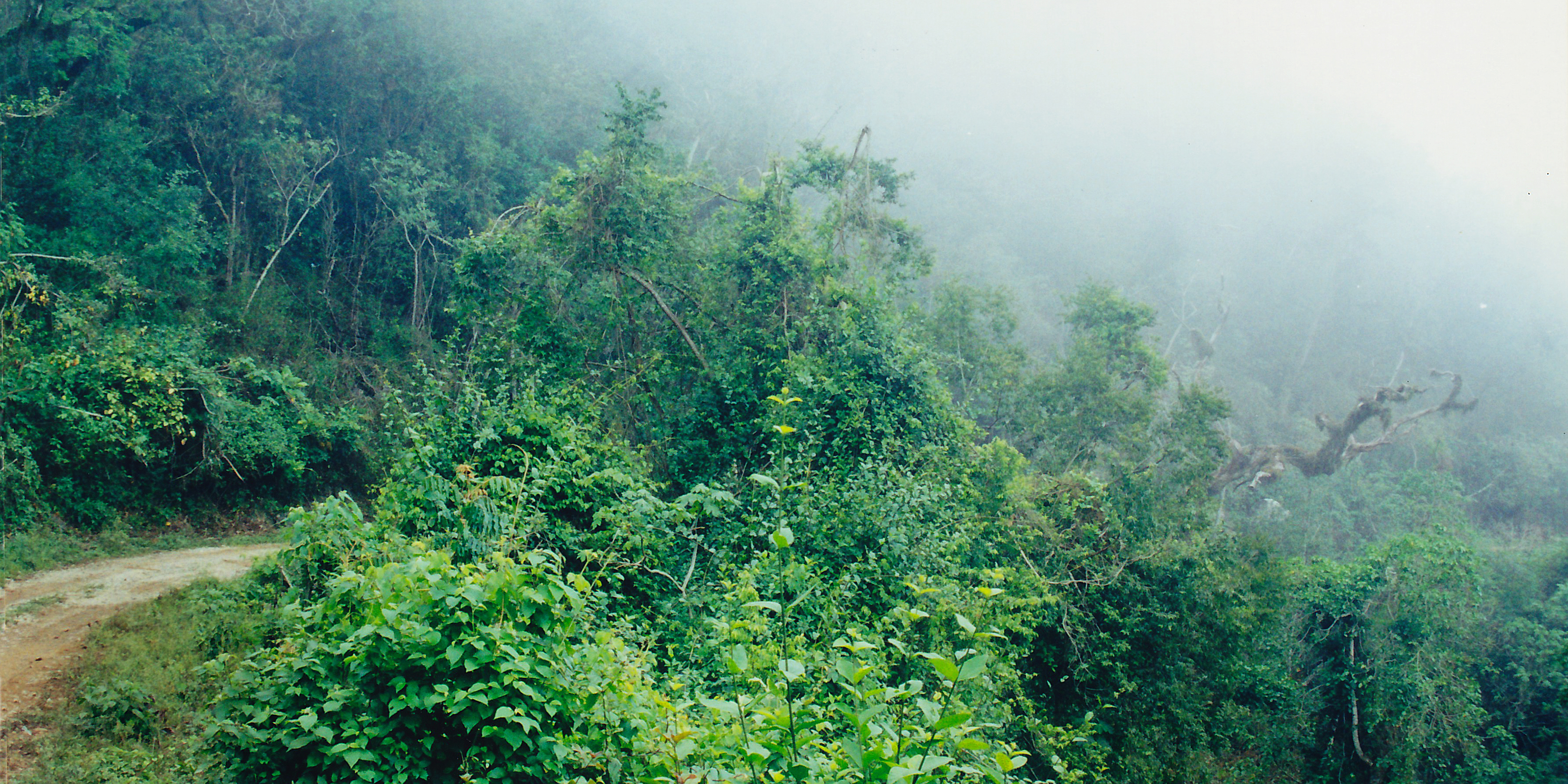
Road into the cloud forest of El Cielo Biosphere Reserve, Municipality of Gómez Farías, Tamaulipas, Mexico (April 2001)

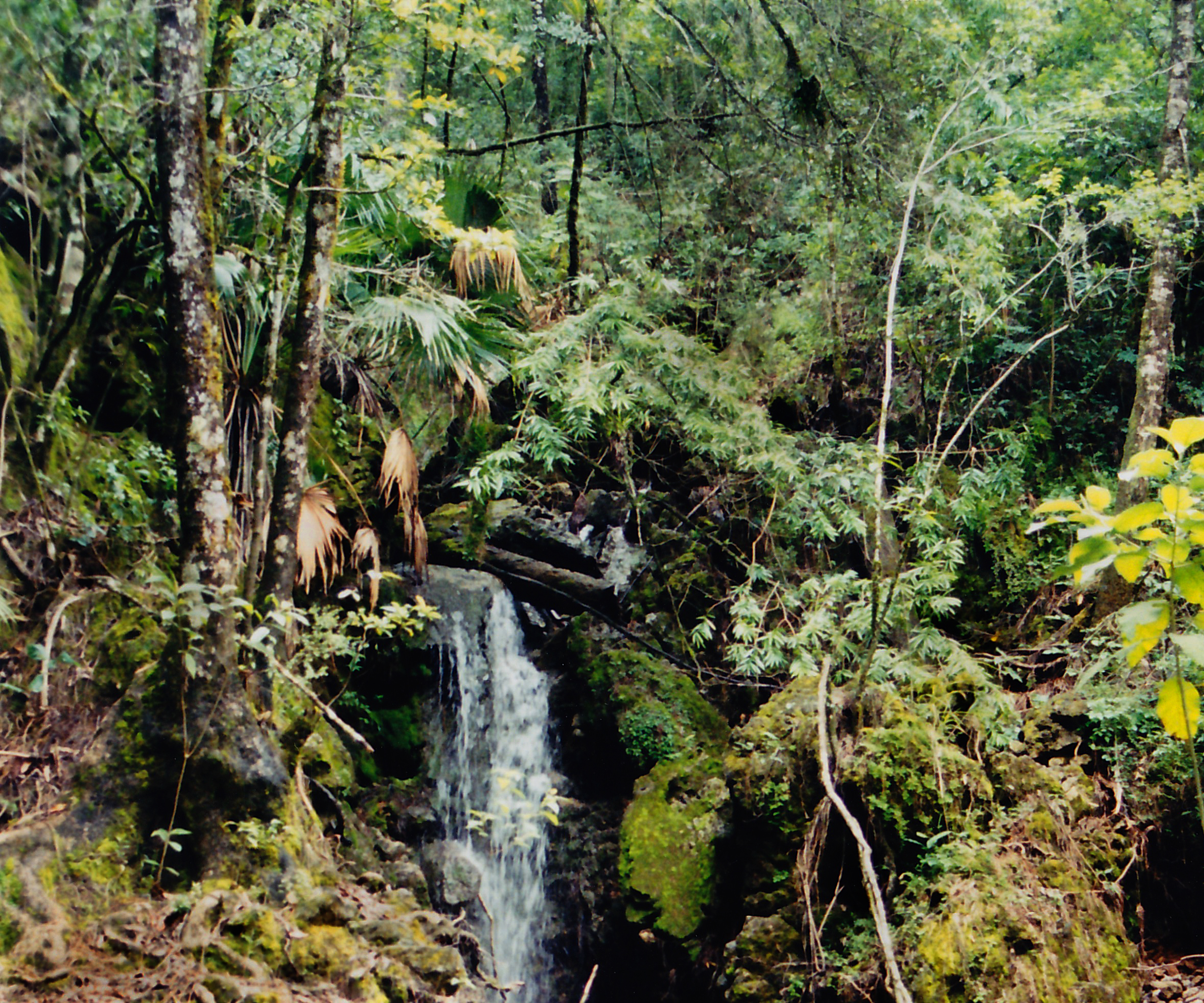
Lush cloud forest vegetation and waterfall in El Cielo Biosphere Reserve (August 2004).

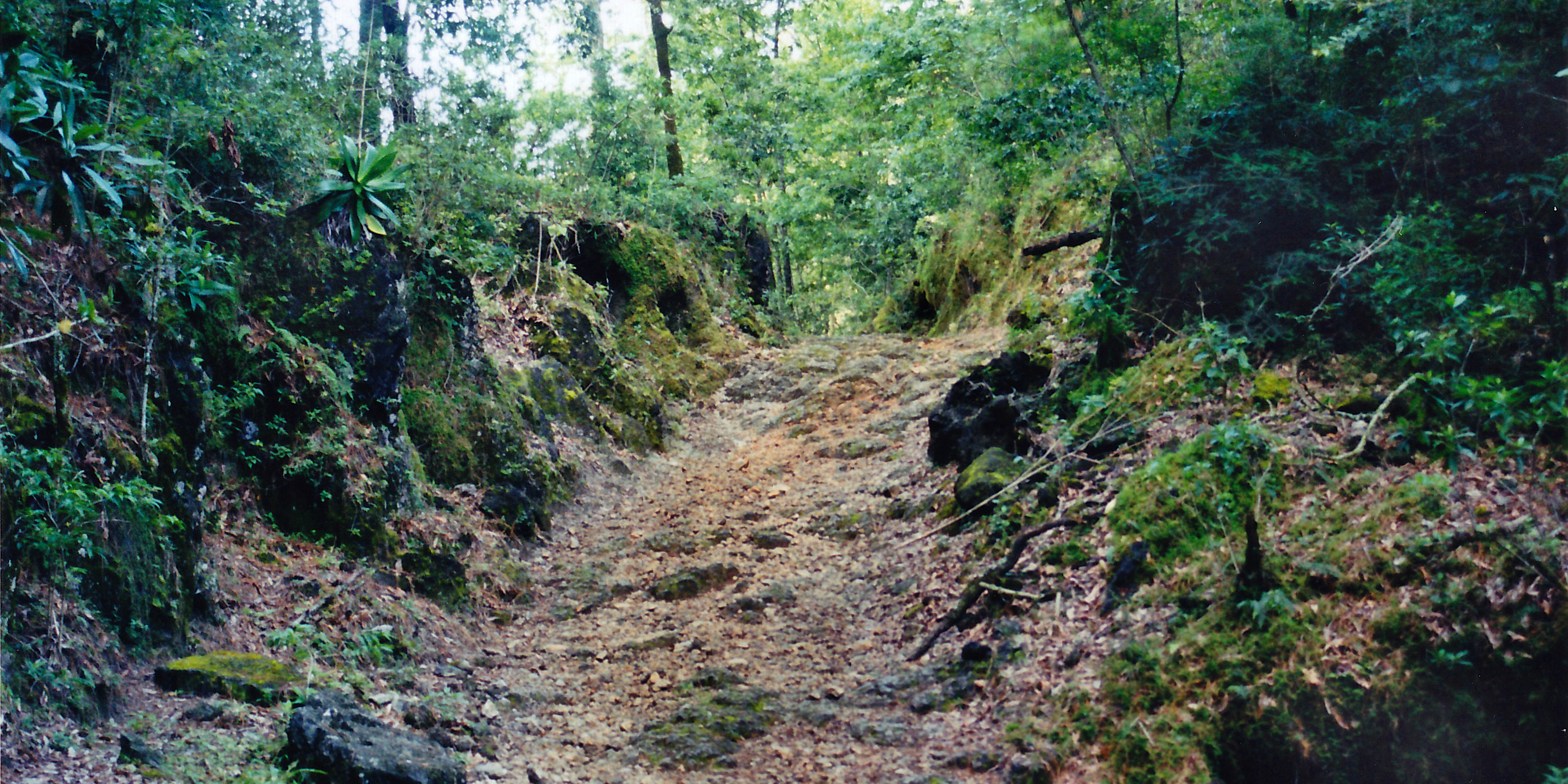
The few roads in the cloud forest of El Cielo Biosphere Reserve are suitable for four-wheel drive vehicles only (August 2004).

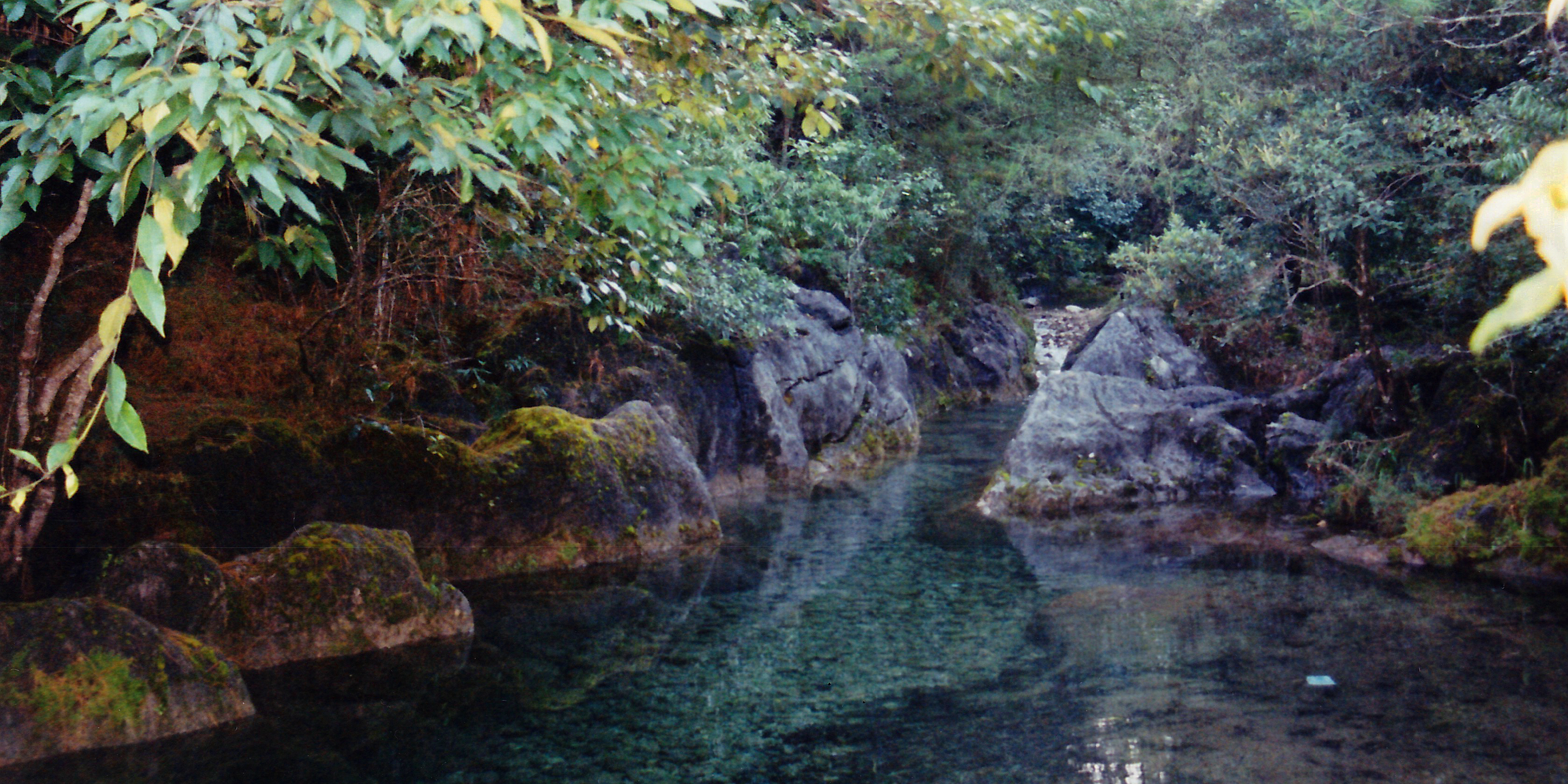
Cloud forest stream in El Cielo Biosphere Reserve (August 2004)

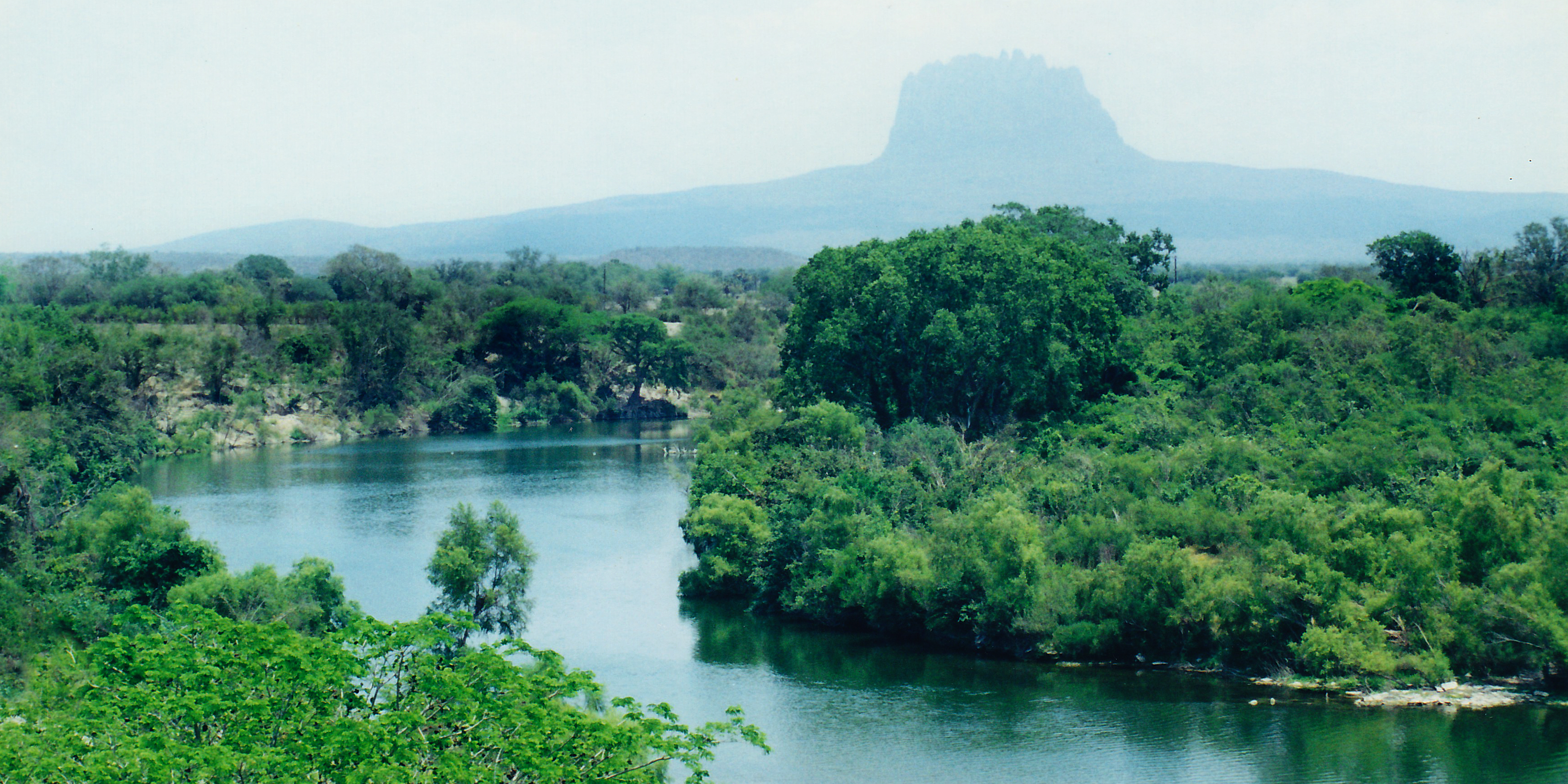
Rio Guayalejo at Highway 80 with silhouette of Cerro del Bernal, Municipality of Gonzlaez, Tamaulipas, Mexico (April 2001)

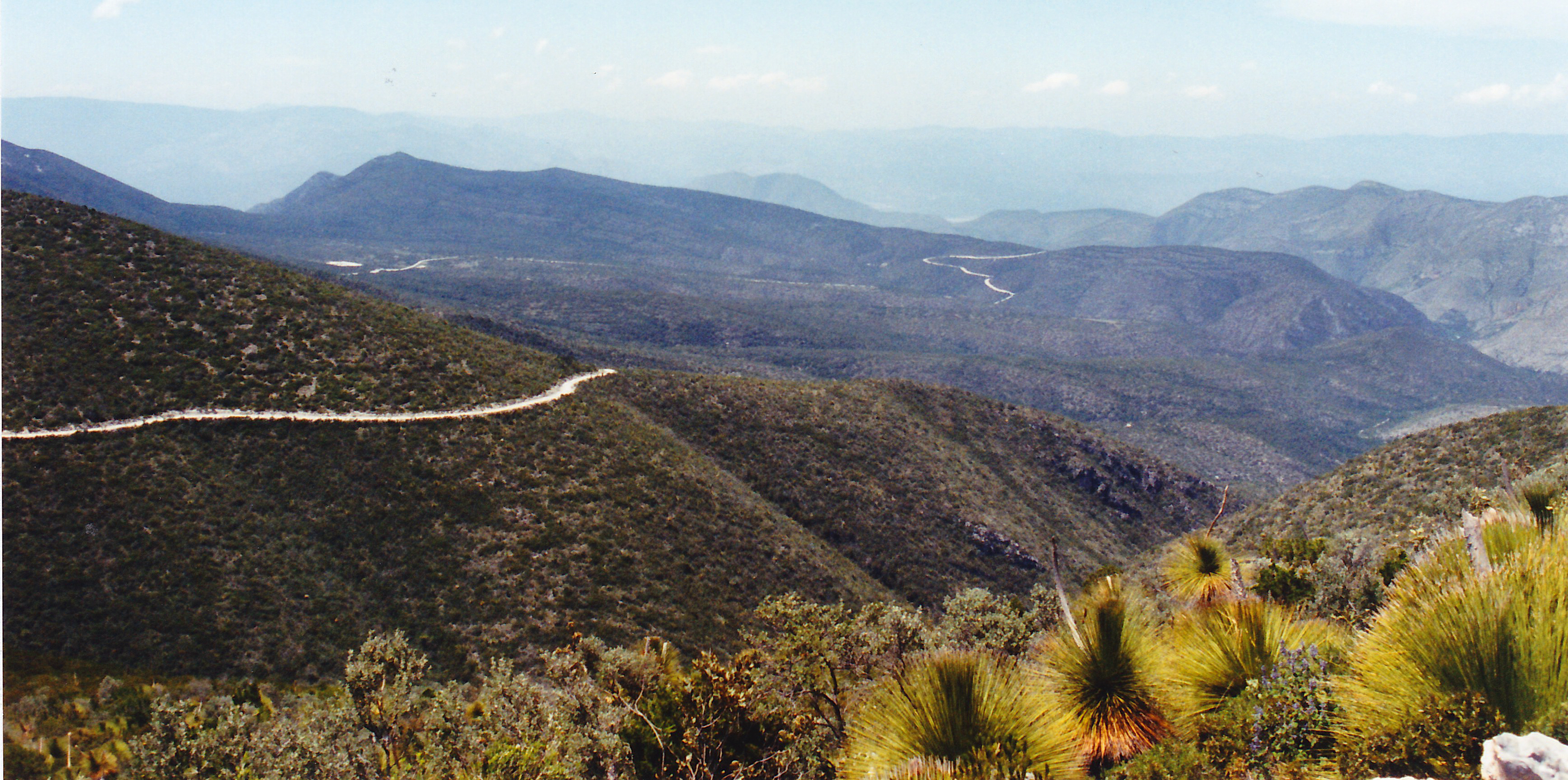
Gravel road through the arid interior slopes of the Sierra Madre Oriental, Municipality of Miquihuana, Tamaulipas, Mexico (August 2003)

=== Climate ===
About 58% of the state has a hot humid subtropical climate. In the centre, north, and towards southwest, an arid and semi-arid climate predominate (both of these account for 38% of the state). A temperate subtropical climate is found in the extreme southwest of the state while in the extreme southeast, such as Tampico, there is a tropical savanna climate. Mean annual temperature in the state is around 23.5 °C (74.3 °F) while mean annual precipitation is 780 mm (31 in), mostly concentrated between June and September.

== Government and infrastructure ==
State agencies include:

- Secretaría de Seguridad Pública (Tamaulipas)
- Secretetaria De Obras Publica
- Fiscalia General De Justica Tamaulipas
- Guardia Estatal

== Economy ==
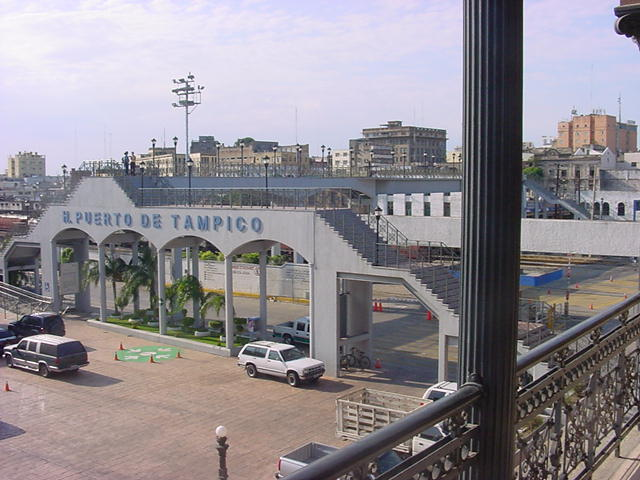
Port of Tampico

Northern Tamaulipas shares its economic culture with that of Texas, and is primarily characterized by agriculture and strong growth in all industrial sectors. This region is home to many of the maquiladoras, factories owned by foreign companies but worked by Mexicans, primarily by women. In the state there are important industrial parks such as the Oradel Industrial Center, located in the border city of Nuevo Laredo.

Southern Tamaulipas's economy is primarily based on the petrochemical industries. There are petrochemical production plants around Altamira as well as a principal Gulf coast container port, refinery facilities in Ciudad Madero and many oil-industry support service companies in Tampico, as well as a major general and bulk cargo port. Also of importance are the tourism and fishing industries, as well as much commercial shipping, based in Tampico and Altamira. The little village of La Pesca, in the municipality of Soto La Marina, about midway between Brownsville, Texas and Tampico, is a rapidly growing tourist area with lovely beaches and excellent fishing both in the Gulf of Mexico and the Rio Soto La Marina. The central zone contains the capital, Ciudad Victoria, and is home to much forestry and farming, as well as some industrial development. About 30% of the population lives here, both in the capital and in Ciudad Mante. Ciudad Victoria is a significant educational center, home to the Autonomous University of Tamaulipas (which also has campuses in other cities in the state), the Regional Technical Institute of Ciudad Victoria, the University of Valle de Bravo, and other institutions of learning.

As of the 1990 Mexican census, 13% of the homes had only dirt floors, nearly 19% had no running water, and over 15% of the homes had no electricity. This was better than the national average but was skewed because of the high rate of development in the urban centers. In rural communities in Tamaulipas, access to running water was available in less than 40% of homes.

As of 2005, Tamaulipas's economy represents 3.3% of Mexico's total gross domestic product or 21,664 million USD. Tamaulipas's economy has a strong focus on export oriented manufacturing (i.e. maquiladora / IMMEX). As of 2005, 258,762 people are employed in the manufacturing sector. Foreign direct investment in Tamaulipas was 386.2 million USD for 2005. The average wage for an employee in Tamaulipas is approximately 240 pesos per day, $2.00 to $3.00 an hour.

== Demographics ==
Largest cities or towns in Tamaulipas Source:
Rank		Municipality	Pop.
1	Reynosa	Reynosa	691,557
2	Matamoros	Matamoros	510,639
3	Nuevo Laredo	Nuevo Laredo	416,055
4	Ciudad Victoria	Victoria	332,100
5	Tampico	Tampico	297,373
6	Ciudad Madero	Ciudad Madero	205,933
7	Miramar	Altamira	161,820
8	Río Bravo	Río Bravo	111,314
9	Ciudad Mante	El Mante	79,515
10	Altamira	Altamira	79,824

Historical population
Year	Pop.	±%
1895	209,106	—
1900	218,948	+4.7%
1910	249,641	+14.0%
1921	286,904	+14.9%
1930	344,039	+19.9%
1940	458,832	+33.4%
1950	718,167	+56.5%
1960	1,024,182	+42.6%
1970	1,456,858	+42.2%
1980	1,924,484	+32.1%
1990	2,249,581	+16.9%
1995	2,527,328	+12.3%
2000	2,753,222	+8.9%
2005	3,024,238	+9.8%
2010	3,268,554	+8.1%
2015	3,441,698	+5.3%
2020	3,527,735	+2.5%

More than 200,000 people born in the southern neighboring state of Veracruz are economic immigrants that travel to work in the maquila industry.

== Crime ==
This state is known to be the site of a territorial struggle between the Gulf Cartel and Los Zetas. The resulting deaths and unresolved kidnappings from the gang violence have been described as a "humanitarian tragedy".

The state of Tamaulipas is one of the most affected by violence in the country, mainly caused by organized crime. In February 2010, an armed conflict broke out between the criminal groups known as the Gulf Cartel and Los Zetas, resulting in many border cities becoming "ghost towns"; such is the case of the border strip known as "La Frontera chica" made up of the cities of Miguel Alemán, Mier, Camargo and Nueva Ciudad Guerrero.

In November 2010, the Mexican army, together with the Federal Police and the Navy, launched an operation around the north of the state of Tamaulipas, allowing hundreds of families to return to their homes after months of exile in other states, mainly in municipalities like Mier, where around 4,000 people returned.

According to INEGI, in 2012 Tamaulipas contained 9 municipalities with a homicide rate higher than 100 per 100,000 inhabitants: Cruillas (106), San Fernando (175), Llera (159), Mier (156), Güémez (141), Hidalgo (135), Nuevo Laredo (134), González (109) and Soto la Marina (100). On the other hand, the municipalities that had had the most intentional homicides in 2012 were Nuevo Laredo (536 homicides), Victoria (165) and San Fernando (102).

In 2013, 880 homicides were recorded in the state, giving a rate of 25 per 100,000 inhabitants. This placed it that year in the 9th position of the states with the most homicides in Mexico. In 2013, Tamaulipas reached the first national place in kidnappings with 275 known cases and the ninth place in violent highway robbery (68 cases).

As of 2021, Tamaulipas continues to be affected by violence, this being one of the factors that have greatly hindered the economic and social activity of the state. In 2014 it was estimated that the losses due to violence by each company in Tamaulipas reached an average of 95 thousand pesos per year (fourth highest in the country). This placed it above the national average in terms of cost of crime for each company (13,600 pesos against the national average of 12,800).

== Education ==
Tamaulipas enjoys standards slightly higher than the national averages, with illiteracy reduced to 5% for those over 15 years of age, average schooling reaches 7.8 years, and as many as 11% have earned a professional degree.Institutions of higher education include:

- Instituto de Estudios Superiores de Tamaulipas (IEST)
- Instituto Tecnológico de Ciudad Madero (ITCM)
- Universidad Autónoma de Tamaulipas
- Tec Campus Tampico (ITESM)

== Transportation ==
=== Highways ===
Mexican Federal Highways (Carreteras Federales) include:

- Highway 2 follows the Rio Bravo del Norte east from Nuevo Laredo 347 km (216 miles) to Matamoros.
- Highway 40 (the Inter-Oceanic Highway) 139 km east to Monterrey.
- Highway 54 south from Mier 136 km (98 miles) to Monterrey.
- Highway 70 for 10 km north from Veracruz to Tampico, and another section from Ciudad Victoria 111 km east to Soto la Marina.
- Highway 80 west from Highway 70 in Tampico for 181 km via Ciudad Mante, Highway 180 in Villa Manuel to San Luis Potosi state at Nuevo Morelos.
- Highway 85 (the Inter-American Highway, part of the Pan-American Highway) south from Nuevo Laredo 230 km (147 miles) to Monterrey, and then south from Monterrey via Ciudad Victoria and Ciudad Mante to Ciudad de Valles (San Luis Potosi state).
- Highway 85D Autopista Monterrey–Nuevo Laredo toll road.
- Highway 97 south from Reynosa 121 km to meet Highway 101 from Matamoros.
- Highway 101 south from Matamoros 498 km via Ciudad Victoria to San Luis Potosi state.
- Highway 180 south from Matamoros via San Fernando to Tampico.

=== Railroads ===
Railroads include: the former Mexican National line from Monterrey to Tampico, and the former Mexican Central from San Luis Potosi to Tampico, now operated by Kansas City Southern de Mexico, who also operate the line from Matamoros via Reynosa to Monterrey (Nuevo Leon).

Two bridges across the Rio Grande: Texas Mexican Railway International Bridge at Nuevo Laredo (1920, Kansas City Southern), and Brownsville & Matamoros International Bridge (1910, from Kansas City Southern to Union Pacific).

=== Airports ===
Tamaulipas is served by five international airports and one national airport.

- Ciudad Mante is served by: Ciudad Mante National Airport
- Ciudad Victoria is served by: General Pedro J. Méndez International Airport
- Matamoros is served by: General Servando Canales International Airport
- Nuevo Laredo is served by: Quetzalcóatl International Airport
- Reynosa is served by: General Lucio Blanco International Airport
- Tampico is served by: General Francisco Javier Mina International Airport

=== Oil pipelines ===
Four oil pipelines terminate at Tampico.

=== Ports ===
A major deep-water port at Tampico and a coastal port at Matamoros.

== Media ==
Newspapers of Tamaulipas include: El Bravo, El Diario de Ciudad Victoria, El Mañana, El Mañana de Reynosa, El Mercurio de Tamaulipas, El Sol de la Tarde, El Sol de Tampico, Hora Cero Tamaulipas, La Razón, La Tarde, La Verdad de Tamaulipas, Milenio, Periódico Valle del Norte, and Siempre con la verdad a tiempo.

== Notable natives and residents ==
- José Ángel Gurría Treviño, diplomat and economist, Secretary-General of the OECD.
- Intocable, Regional Mexican musical group
- Fito Olivares, Cumbia singer/musician
- Alicja Bachleda-Curus, actress, singer
- Rosemary Barkett, US judge
- Jean-Louis Berlandier (1803–1851) French-Mexican naturalist, physician, and anthropologist.
- James Carlos Blake, award-winning novelist
- José María Jesús Carbajal, Mexican freedom fighter, military governor of Tamaulipas
- Linda Christian, actress
- Ivan Contreras, volleyball olympics
- Ana Brenda Contreras, actress, singer
- Amalia González Caballero de Castillo Ledón, diplomat, cabinet minister, minister plenipotentiary, writer,
- Laura Elizondo, beauty queen/model
- Juan García Esquivel, composer/band leader/pianist
- Laura Flores, actress
- Manuel González Flores, general and politician who served as president of Mexico from 1880 to 1884.
- Víctor García, singer
- Elma González, plant cell biologist
- Rodrigo González, musician and songwriter
- Emilio Portes Gil, president of Mexico after the death of Alvaro Obregon in 1928.
- Alejandro Gomez Monteverde, director/producer
- Manuel Raga, basketball player
- Aurora Robles, model
- James de La Rosa, welterweight boxer
- Juan de la Rosa, boxer on the NBC's show The Contender
- Arleth Terán, actress
- Rigo Tovar, singer/songwriter/composer/actor
- Ismael Valdez, former starting pitcher in Major League Baseball
- Eduardo Verástegui, actor/model
- B. Traven, German author and activist
- Juan Garcia Abrego, drug criminal
- Juan Nepomuceno Guerra, smuggler/founder of C.D.G.
- Mauricio Garces, actor
- Mayra Flores, politician, first Mexican-born American congressperson

== State anthem ==
The current anthem of the state of Tamaulipas is Himno a Tamaulipas, composed in 1926 by Rafael Antonio Pérez Pérez, set to music by Alfredo Tamayo Marín. Normally, only the chorus, first verse and chorus are sung in public.

Coro:
Viva Tamaulipas altiva y heroica,
la región que dormita en la margen del río.
La sangre palpita en el pecho mío,
al recuerdo glorioso de sus héroes y su honor.
Viva Tamaulipas la tierra querida
que en las horas aciagas dio su sangre y su vida.
Cantemos un himno de amor y lealtad
y todo Tamaulipas vibre a la voz de libertad.

Chorus:
Long live Tamaulipas, proud and heroic,
The region that slumbers on the banks of the river.
Blood pounds in my chest
At the glorious memory of her heroes and honor.
Long live Tamaulipas, the beloved land
That in the dire times gave her blood and life.
Let us sing a hymn of love and loyalty
And let all Tamaulipas vibrate to the voice of freedom.

Estrofa I:
Fuiste cuna de nobles varones
que con la luz de su saber iluminaron,
y al pasar por la tierra dejaron
con sus obras su nombre inmortal.
Hoy la historia, canta la gloria
de tus héroes en marcha triunfal.

Verse I:
Thou wert the cradle of noble men
Who by the light of their knowledge illuminated,
And who in passing through the world left
By their works their immortal name.
Today history sings the glory
Of your heroes in triumphal march.

Estrofa II:
En los tiempos de duelo y de guerra
con tu valor fuiste el honor de nuestro suelo.
Defendiste heroica la tierra
y tu espada fue siempre inmortal.
Hoy la historia, canta la gloria
de tus heroes en marcha triunfal.

Verse II:
In times of grief and war,
With your courage you were the honor of our soil.
You heroically defended the land
And your sword was always immortal.
Today the story, sings the glory
Of your heroes' triumphal march.

Estrofa III:
En tu seno de mirtos y rosas
fuente de amor en el hogar tamaulipeco.
¡Son tus hijas mujeres virtuosas
que engalanan el patio vergel!
Hoy la historia, canta la gloria
con el mirto, la oliva y laurel.

Verse III:
In your heart of myrtle and roses,
Source of love in the Tamaulipecan home.
Your daughters are virtuous women
That adorn the courtyard garden!
Today the story, sings the glory
With the myrtle, olive and laurel.

Estrofa IV:
Los que duermen eterno descanso,
los que por ti con fe y valor su vida dieron,
por hacerte feliz sucumbieron
bajo el fuego que te hizo inmortal.
Hoy la historia, canta la gloria
de tus heroes en marcha triunfal.

Verse IV:
Those who sleep in eternal rest,
That for you with faith and courage gave his life,
Succumbed to make you happy
Under the fire that made you immortal.
Today the story, sings the glory
Of your heroes' triumphal march.

Estrofa V:
Ya la aurora de tiempos mejores
iluminó con su fulgor nuestros albores;
y en los surcos que abre el arado
va sembrando la fraternidad.
Y su anhelo, protege el cielo
floreciendo en la santa hermandad.

Verse V:
Since the dawn of better times
Illuminated by his splendor our dawn;
And in the plow furrows opened
Is sowing the fraternity.
And his desire, protects the heavens
Flourishing in the holy brotherhood.

Estrofa VI:
Nuestros hombres hoy luchan ufanos
por mejorar su condición de ciudadanos.
Igualdad es la flor del ensueño
que el obrero pretende alcanzar.
Y si alcanza, una esperanza
es que sabe morir o triunfar.

Verse VI:
Our self-satisfied men today struggle
To improve their status as citizens.
Equality is the flower of dreams
That the worker strives to achieve.
And if he reaches it, a hope
Is to know death or victory..

== See also ==
- Sierra de Tamaulipas
- Tamaulipan (disambiguation)
