= Lystrophis =

Scientific classification
- Kingdom: Animalia
- Phylum: Chordata
- Class: Reptilia
- Order: Squamata
- Suborder: Serpentes
- Family: Colubridae
- Subfamily: Xenodontinae
- Genus: Lystrophis; Cope, 1885

Genus of snakes

Lystrophis is the genus of tricolored South American hognose snakes. They mimic milk snakes or coral snakes with their red, black, and white ringed patterns.

== Species ==
The genus Lystrophis contains five species that are recognized as being valid.

- Lystrophis dorbignyi (A.M.C. Duméril, Bibron & A.H.A. Duméril, 1854) – southern Brazil and southern Paraguay to Argentina
- Lystrophis histricus (Jan, 1863) – southern Brazil, Paraguay, and Uruguay to northeastern Argentina
- Lystrophis nattereri (Steindachner, 1867) – southern Brazil
- Lystrophis pulcher (Jan, 1863) – southern South America, parts of Brazil, Argentina, Paraguay and Bolivia
- Lystrophis semicinctus (A.M.C. Duméril, Bibron & A.H.A. Duméril, 1854) – central Argentina to southern Bolivia and southwestern Brazil

Lystrophis dorbignyi is the type species for the genus Lystrophis.

Nota bene: A binomial authority in parentheses indicates that the species was originally described in a genus other than Lystrophis.

== Taxonomy ==
All species of Lystrophis are sometimes included in the genus Xenodon.
