= Hognose =

Common name for several snake species

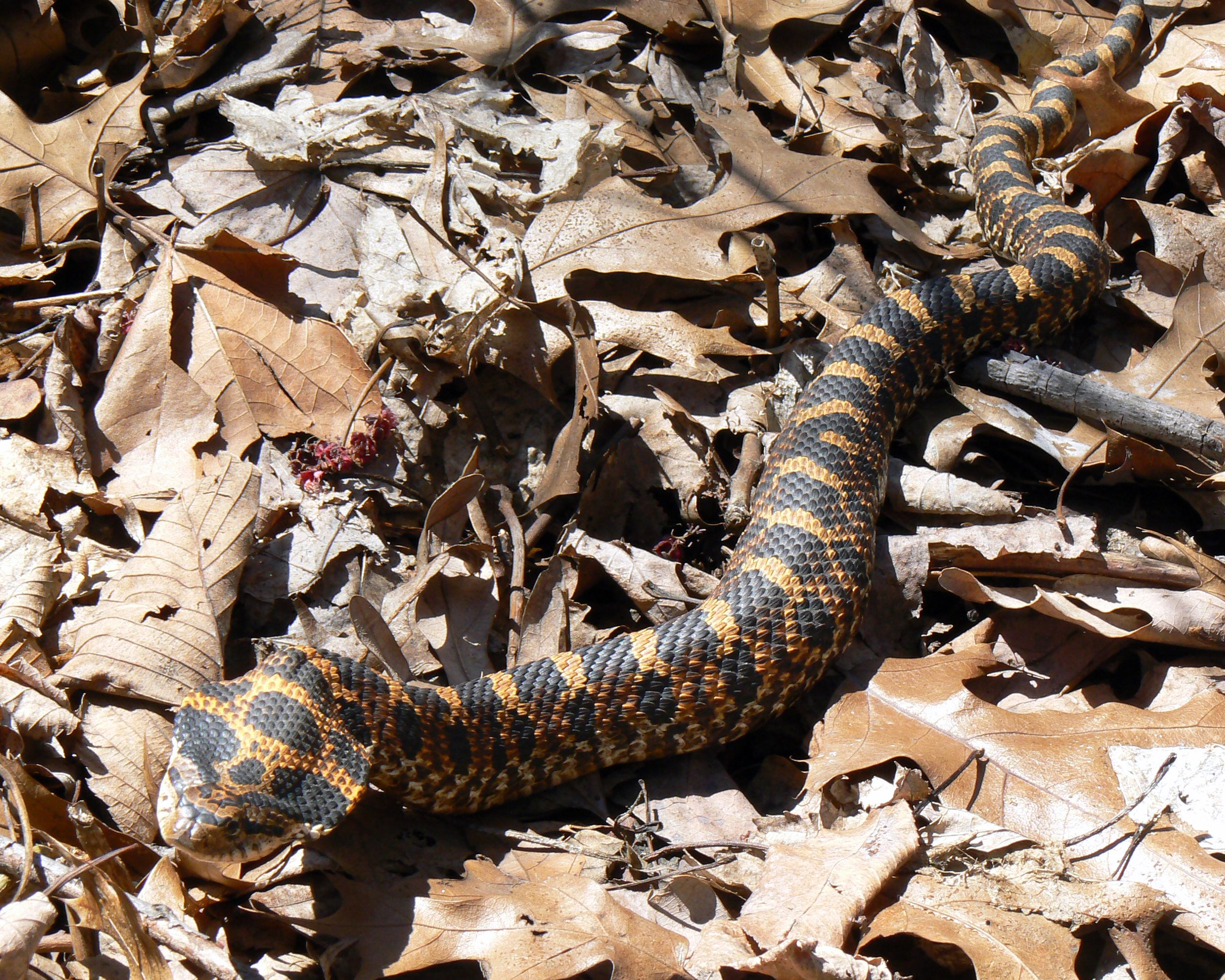
Eastern hognose snake (Heterodon platirhinos)

Hognose snake is a common name for several unrelated species of snakes with upturned snouts, classified in two colubrid genera and one pseudoxyrhophiid genus.

They include the following genera:

- Heterodon, which occur mainly in the United States and northern Mexico
- Leioheterodon, the hognose snakes native to Madagascar
- Lystrophis, the South American hognose snakes.

The North American Heterodon species are known for their habit of thanatosis: playing dead when threatened.

== Species ==
Genus Heterodon:

The following Heterodon classifications are found in the 9th edition (last updated: 31 March 2025) of the "Checklist of the Standard English Names of Amphibians & Reptiles" from the Society for the Study of Amphibians and Reptiles.

- Mexican hognose snake, Heterodon kennerlyi Kennicott, 1860
- Western hognose snake, Heterodon nasicus Baird & Girard, 1852
  - Western/Plains hognose snake, Heterodon nasicus nasicus Baird & Girard, 1852
  - Gloyd's hognose snake, Heterodon nasicus gloydi Edgren, 1952
- Eastern hognose snake, Heterodon platirhinos Latreille, 1801
- Southern hognose snake, Heterodon simus (Linnaeus, 1766)

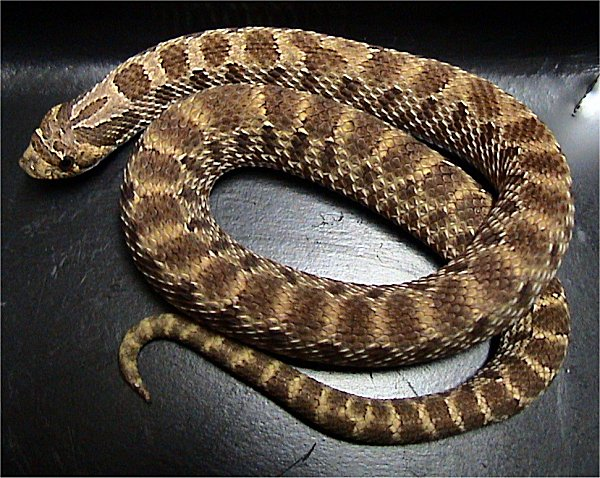
Plains hognose snake (Heterodon nasicus)

Genus Leioheterodon:

- Speckled hognose snake, Leioheterodon geayi (Mocquard, 1905)
- Malagasy giant hognose snake, Leioheterodon madagascariensis (A.M.C. Duméril, Bibron & A.H.A. Duméril, 1854)
- Blonde hognose snake, Leioheterodon modestus (Günther, 1863)

Genus Lystrophis:

- South American hognose snake, Lystrophis dorbignyi (A.M.C. Duméril, Bibron & A.H.A Duméril, 1854)
- Jan's hognose snake, Lystrophis histricus (Jan, 1863)
- Lystrophis matogrossensis Scrocchi & Cruz, 1993
- Lystrophis nattereri (Steindachner, 1867)
- Tricolor hognose snake, Lystrophis pulcher (Jan, 1863)
- Ringed hognose snake, Lystrophis semicinctus (A.M.C. Duméril, Bibron & A.H.A. Duméril, 1854)

Nota bene: A binomial authority in parentheses indicates that the species was originally described in a different genus.

== Description ==
The hognose snakes' most distinguishing characteristic is their upturned snout/rostral scale, which aids in digging in sandy soils by using a sweeping, side to side motion. They also like to burrow in masses of humus. Lieoheterodon species are known to dig up the eggs of lizards.

Hognose snakes are extremely variable in color and pattern. Heterodon nasicus and H. kennerlyi tend to be sandy colored with black and white markings, while H. platirhinos varies from reds, greens, oranges, browns, to melanistic (i.e. black) depending on locality. They are sometimes blotched and sometimes solid-colored. Leiohetereodon geayi is a brown or tan colored snake with dark speckling on it. There are also many different morphs when bred in captivity.

== Behavior ==
Juvenile hognose snake playing dead

When threatened, hognose snakes will hiss, flatten their necks and raise their heads off the ground like cobras. They sometimes feign strikes, but actual Heterodon bites are very rare. This behaviour has earned them local common names such as "puff adder", "blowing adder", "flathead", "spreadhead", "spreading adder" or "hissing adder". Note: For Heterodon, "puff adder" is a common name inconsistent with established usage. "Puff adder" is the accepted common name of Bitis arietans, an unrelated, dangerously venomous African species of viper, which incidentally does not flatten its neck in any threat display.

If this threat display fails to deter a would-be predator, Heterodon species often roll onto their backs and play dead, going so far as to emit a foul musk and fecal matter from their cloaca (in liquid form) and let their tongues hang out of their mouths, sometimes accompanied by small droplets of blood. If they are rolled upright while in this state, they will often roll back as if insisting they really are dead. It has been observed that the snake, while appearing to be dead, will still watch the threat that caused the death pose. The snake will 'resurrect' sooner if the threat is looking away from it than if the threat is looking at the snake.

They are rather timid snakes and commonly hide from predators by burrowing down into leaves, sand, etc.

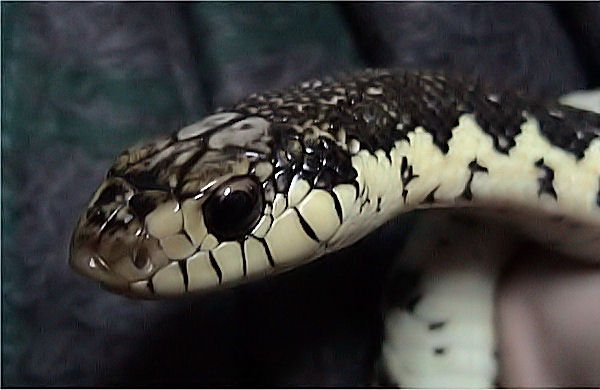
Malagasy giant hognose snake (Leioheterodon madagascariensis)

== Diet ==
Heterodon are diurnal active foragers that typically consume their prey live without any constriction or body pinning, primarily relying on only their jaws to subdue their prey.

For most hognose snake species, the bulk of their diet is made up of rodents and lizards. Heterodon platirhinos is an exception, and specializes in feeding on toads, although other food items such as eggs and insects can make up as much as 50% of its diet.

== In captivity ==
Hognose snakes are frequently found in herpetoculture. Heterodon nasicus is often considered to be the easiest to care for, and captive-bred stock is easily found. Heterodon platirhinos is also commonly found, but their dietary requirements can be a challenge for some keepers, and there is anecdotal evidence to suggest that feeding them a diet of exclusively rodents contributes to liver problems and a shortened life span. Leioheterodon species are imported regularly from Madagascar, but they are not often bred in captivity and get much larger, so they can pose a set of different challenges for care. Lystrophis species are fairly new to the commercial reptile trade, and are now commonly bred in captivity, but can be some of the more expensive hognose snakes available. Some states, such as the state of Colorado, have strict laws on keeping the western hognose snake. It is considered a native species to Colorado, so it is protected by law. The law states that an individual can keep no more than four native snakes, and forbids the shipping, selling, and breeding of them in the state of Colorado.

== Toxicity ==
Hognose snakes are generally not viewed as venomous based on their grouping as non-front-fanged snakes. Although they produce a mildly toxic saliva from low-pressure secretions of the oral Duvernoy's gland, they lack a specialized delivery system required for the medical classification as venom. Compared to hollowed fangs present in viperid and elapid snakes, the teeth of the hognose are smooth and strong without grooves.

Hognose snakes do not show behaviours typically seen in venomous animals, but are frequently mistaken for the slightly more dangerous rear fanged snakes which possess grooved teeth and saliva intended for dispatching prey. Hognose have never been formally documented using their saliva to kill prey, rather they kill by sawing and impaling prey, biting prey from the side rather than at the head to facilitate this process. Hognoses are perhaps best described as a transitional species with toxic saliva that is only produced during feeding, failing to fall into either of the classic recognisable categories of venomous or non venomous. The role of the Duvernoy's gland secretions in hunting and feeding or other biological purposes are not fully resolved.

Hognose snakes rarely bite in self-defense and their saliva is unlikely to cause serious injury to humans. Case reports of Heterodon nasicus in captivity biting during regular handling have mostly been linked to a possible misidentification as prey, with the effects including local pain, swelling and local tissue damage.
