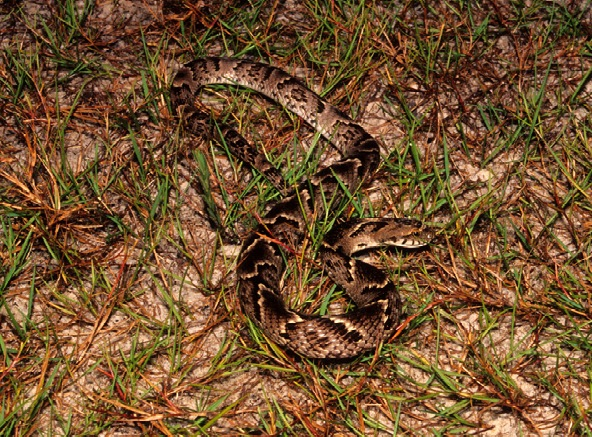

Conservation status
- Least Concern (IUCN 3.1)

Scientific classification
- Kingdom: Animalia
- Phylum: Chordata
- Class: Reptilia
- Order: Squamata
- Suborder: Serpentes
- Family: Colubridae
- Subfamily: Dipsadinae
- Genus: Xenodon
- Species: X. merremii

Binomial name
- Xenodon merremii (Wagler, 1824)

Synonyms
- Ophis merremii Wagler, 1824; Xenodon merremi — Fitzinger, 1826; Xenodon irregularis Günther, 1863; Trigonocephalus flavescens Bacqué, 1906; Trigonocephalus alternatus binocularius Bacqué, 1906; Waglerophis merremii — Romano & Hoge, 1972; Xenodon merremi — Wallach et al., 2014; Xenodon merremii — Costa & Bérnils, 2015

= Xenodon merremii =

Species of snake

Xenodon merremii, also known commonly as Wagler's snake, is a species of snake in the subfamily Dipsadinae of the family Colubridae. The species is endemic to South America and is widespread in the eastern half of the continent.

== Geographic range ==
Xenodon merremii occurs in Venezuela, Guyana, Suriname, French Guiana, Brazil, Bolivia, Paraguay, Uruguay, and northern Argentina.

== Habitat ==
The preferred natural habitat of Xenodon merremii is open areas of savanna and shrubland, at elevations from sea level to 2,000 m (6,600 ft), but it is also common in disturbed habitats.

== Etymology ==
The specific name, merremii, is in honor of German herpetologist Blasius Merrem.

== Description ==
Adults of Xenodon merremii are usually 1 m (39 in) or less in total length (tail included). Its color pattern is very variable. Some "red phase" specimens are a uniform reddish tan. Other specimens are pale brown dorsally, with broad dark-brown crossbands, which are edged with black, and are narrower or interrupted in the middle. The latter color pattern resembles that of the venomous snake Bothrops alternatus.

== Diet ==
Xenodon merremii preys on insects, frogs, toads, lizards, and sometimes snakes. Like other rear-fanged toad-eaters of the genera Heterodon and Lystrophis, X. merremii uses its enlarged posterior maxillary teeth to puncture and deflate toads which have defensively puffed themselves up, thereby making them easier to swallow.

== Defensive behavior ==
When threatened, Xenodon merremii raises the anterior part of its body, inflating and spreading its neck, similar to a cobra.

== Reproduction ==
Xenodon merremii is oviparous.
