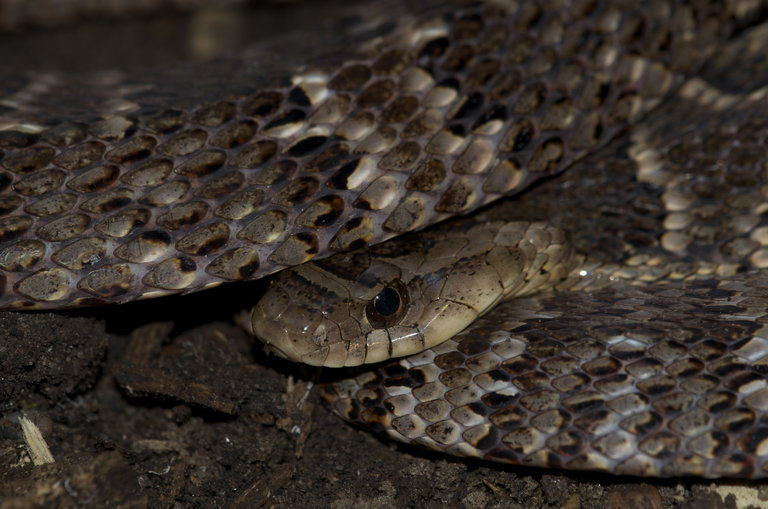

Conservation status
- Least Concern (IUCN 3.1)

Scientific classification
- Kingdom: Animalia
- Phylum: Chordata
- Class: Reptilia
- Order: Squamata
- Suborder: Serpentes
- Family: Colubridae
- Genus: Xenodon
- Species: X. rabdocephalus

Binomial name
- Xenodon rabdocephalus (Weid, 1824)

Synonyms
- Coluber rabdocephalus Wied, 1824; Xenodon rabdocephalus — Fitzinger, 1826; Xenodon colubrinus Wucherer, 1862; Xenodon bertholdi Jan, 1863; Xenodon angustirostris W. Peters, 1864; Xenodon suspectus Cope 1868; Xenodon bipraeoculis Cope, 1885; Xenodon mexicanus H.M. Smith, 1940; Xenodon rabdocephalus — Liner, 1994

= Xenodon rabdocephalus =

Species of snake

Xenodon rabdocephalus, commonly known as the false fer-de-lance, is a species of mildly venomous rear-fanged snake in the family Colubridae. The species is native to Central America and northern South America. There are two recognized subspecies.

== Geographic range ==
X. rabdocephalus is found in southern Mexico in the states of Guerrero, Veracruz, Yucatan and Campeche, through Guatemala, Belize, Honduras, El Salvador, Costa Rica and Panama. In northern South America it is found in Colombia, Venezuela, Guyana, Suriname, French Guiana, Ecuador, Peru, Bolivia and Brazil where it occurs in the states of Amapá, Rondônia, Pará, Espírito Santo and Bahia.

== Habitat ==
The preferred natural habitat of X. rabdocephalus is forest in the moist lowlands and the premontane regions, at altitudes from sea level to 1,500 m (4,900 ft).

== Description ==
X. rabdocephalus is a medium-sized snake which reaches a total length (including tail) of 80 cm (31 in). It is mainly brown with a series of brown and grey hourglass-shaped dorsal blotches on the body.

== Diet ==
X. rabdocephalus feeds mainly on frogs and toads, including tadpoles.

== Reproduction ==
X. rabdocephalus is oviparous.

== Subspecies ==
Two subspecies are recognized as being valid, including the nominotypical subspecies.

- X. r. rabdocephalus (Wied, 1824)
- X. r. mexicanus H.M. Smith, 1940

Nota bene: A trinomial authority in parentheses indicates that the subspecies was originally described in a genus other than Xenodon.
