= List of Toad Patrol characters =

The following is a list of characters from the animated television series Toad Patrol.

== Main ==
- Fur Foot (voiced by Terrence Scammell) is the leader of the Toad Patrol and the oldest of the eight Toadlets. He has red Mohawk hair with overall furry swimsuit. He uses a cougar claw, called a "hook", for various purposes including grabbing onto objects and climbing, but never anything violent. The claw was given to him by Mistle Toad while in the waterfall. Fur Foot is usually soft-spoken and sincere but he can also be pushy, having pushed for being leader in the first place. (Claiming that he should be the leader because he is the oldest.) While he didn't influence the creation of the Toad Patrol (Oyster named their group), he is often looked up to thanks to his strong leadership qualities and courage which becomes more apparent as the series progresses. He is also well respected for his ability to admit when he's made a mistake and to continue onward.
- Beauty Stem (incorrectly named Beauty Star) (voiced by Sonja Ball) is the second oldest, beautiful and somewhat of a mother figure towards the younger toadlets, particularly Panther Cap. She eventually begins to acquire the talents of a great healer from a wandering ancient healer known as The Outsider. She learns many techniques and becomes of great importance to the group. Beauty Stem's special item is "shine", a dust she gathered from fireflies. She can use this to cast light even in the darkest of night. Earth Star takes an interest in Beauty Stem during their first meeting, much to Elf Cup's dismay. While Beauty Stem paid no attention at first, she came to return his affection as the series went on.
- Elf Cup (voiced by Dawn Ford) is the third oldest as well as the second youngest of the three female toadlets. She wanted to be a leader. She is cheerful and playful, but rather stubborn, having argued with Fur Foot over the leadership position. This was not completely unjustified as she has been shown to have leadership potential and a strikingly similar personality to Fur Foot. Elf Cup wanted to be a leader. Later in the series, she has been shown to give Fur Foot more sympathy if ever he feels that he has somehow failed or made a mistake. When Beauty Stem isn't around, she also becomes more affectionate towards Panther Cap, speaking to him and playing his lullaby for him to get him to sleep. She plays a hollow reed, called a "tooter", which is similar to a penny whistle. It was given to her by a Tunnel Toad. She has shown great musical talent with it, and it comes to be beneficial to the Toad Patrol in the future. Because of her musical talent, she is naturally very fond of Earth Star.
- Shaggy Mane (voiced by Dawn Ford) is the fourth oldest and is named for his yellow, shaggy hair. Shaggy Mane's contribution to the group is somewhat questionable at first. He has a knack for getting himself and others into trouble, which caused him to run away. With the help of Earth Star, he comes to realize his greatest contribution, which is his ability to name things. He is classified as "The Giver of Names" because of this, and he has named many things from the "Yellow Ball" (the sun) to the "Rumble Crushers" (automobiles). He acquires a very beneficial vine, which he calls a "coil". He is good at making up poems on the spot, and his higher sense of culture begins to play a larger part in interpreting the writing of the Ancients.
- Puff Ball (voiced by Rick Jones) is the third youngest. He is tall, very strong, but somewhat fat and lazy. He actually looks older than the others and is fairly mature despite being one of the younger toadlets. His natural strength and endurance, as well as his down to earth thinking saves the Toad Patrol several times. Puff Ball comes into possession of a powerful hammer called the "Thunder Stick," which is actually a piece of branch from a Thunder Tree. He pulled it from a beaver dam to quell a forest fire. Combined with his strength and straightforward thinking, he becomes an invaluable asset to the group and helps support his friends. Puff Ball is a bit of a pessimist, and often sees the downside to things. While this aggravates the rest of the group at first, they eventually begin to see it not as something negative, but merely him keeping things real and in perspective. As the series progresses however, Puff Ball develops a love of sarcasm and if his pessimistic attitude won't annoy the others first, his sarcasm will get them instead. Although he never means anything by it and his friends are always his top priority. "Up the hill, down the hill, it never ends," becomes his favourite quote although he doesn't start really using it often until season two.
- Oyster (voiced by Bryn McAuley) is the second youngest along with her twin, Slippery Jack. She is somewhat insecure, but nonetheless acts as one of the group's main source of comedy relief and cheerfulness. Her special item is called a "see-all," a sort of telescope created from a crystal and a hollow branch she found. She doesn't really have any special skills (a fact she brings up late in the series that she feels extremely ashamed about), but her innate optimism and energy is a far greater contribution than she may be aware of. And unbeknownst to her, she may not be smart like Slippery Jack but she is often shown to have more common sense than he does, able to fool him and make him the brunt of her jokes easily. She also figures the little things out quickly. (Which contributed to her being able to make the see-all in the first place.) In fact, she is the very one who came up with the idea to call the toadlet group the "Toad Patrol." She has been shown to dislike 'gotchas' since she was scooped up in a pail in Scooped.
- Slippery Jack (voiced by Brady Moffatt) is the second youngest along with his twin, Oyster, and wears glasses. He carries around birch bark to create maps, called "pathfinds", given to him by Earth Star. Being by far the most intelligent of the group, Slippery Jack is good at solving complex problems. With great skill in map making and strategizing, he is an invaluable asset to his friends and family. Because of his intelligence, Slippery Jack feels awkward around the others often and has a somewhat odd way of speaking. This bothers him for much of the series but eventually he realizes that he doesn't need to be anything but himself with his friends. He hates it when the other toadlets refer to him and Oyster as "The Twins," or refer to him as "S.J." He comes to form a strong friendship with Shaggy Mane late in the series. He is shown to be claustrophobic and easily stumped by simpler problem solving.
- Panther Cap (voiced by Sonja Ball) is the youngest of the eight Toadlets, also a youngest member of the Toad Patrol. He always wears his green hat with stitches. While Panther Cap is passive and shy, he is one of the most important characters. Panther Cap, like Fur Foot, often feels like the odd one out. Not because he's feeling unusual, Because it is due to the interesting destiny which seems to have fallen upon him. At the start of the series, Panther Cap granted the gift, The ability to hear the mysterious messages of the Thunder Trees, which helps the toadlets to find the all-important Fairy Ring and has other great uses as well. While afraid of the whispers at first, Mistle Toad encouraged Panther Cap to embrace his ability to hear the Thunder Trees and lead the others to the Fairy Ring. Panther Cap carries a "pointer," a small acorn which points the way from one Thunder Tree to another and he keeps his acorn inside of his hat. In the 14th episode, once in Toad Hollow, Panther Cap receives an urgent call from Mistle Toad, urging him to leave Toad Hollow and go back to the forest. In the second season, it is revealed that Panther Cap may have abilities that have not been seen since the time of the Ancients. He is able to hear their spirits and even learns a powerful incantation that appears to control water and possibly most natural things in the forest. The extent of his power is unknown. In the 24th episode, Panther Cap worries that he'll no longer be able to hear the words of the Thunder Trees because he had some time to adjust to his special gift and the voices got screwed up by the Ancients.
- Earth Star (voiced by Michael O'Reilly) is a minstrel toadlet, born a season before the Toad Patrol, who carries a banjo called a "strumalong" and wears sunglasses. He is a mysterious toadlet who was part of a disastrous expedition of toadlets prior to the series. This group was doomed to miss the Fairy Ring and all turned into Toadstools. Somehow, he turned back to normal for no reason and found the main characters later. Earth Star is extremely easy-going, friendly and helpful, despite keeping his distance at first. It is later revealed that he harbors deep fears of having more friends turn into Toadstools and wants to remain alone, but in his heroic efforts to take Panther Cap through the Fairy Ring before it closed, he came to enjoy life in Toad Hollow. While his musical talent is great, and admirable to Elf Cup, his quick thinking and acting often makes him very influential to the others. He takes an interest in Beauty Stem when they first meet, and constantly flirts with her despite her initial lack of acknowledgment. She later starts to return his affection like in episode 14 after telling that he can stay in Toad Hollow when she kissed him. As the series progresses, he begins to fear that if he leaves Toad Hollow, he will turn back into a Toadstool until the music is played. His first appearance in the second season is the beginning of the 14th episode. To prevent from turning into a toadstool by staying in Toad Hollow.
- Mistle Toad (voiced by Long John Baldry) is a mysterious sage that befriends the Toad Patrol not long after they begin their journey. He is very knowledgeable about most things and is very capable of taking care of himself. He acts as a sort of guide for the youngsters and appears here and there to help them. He's able to gauge Fur Foot's behavior and Panther Cap's emotion. His appearances become more numerous as the series progresses. He made it to the Fairy Ring in time long ago. He is also the instigator of the main story arc for the second season, having found a long lost scripture of the Ancients which may hold the key for freeing the lost toadlets once and for all. Unfortunately, he is accidentally frozen and telepathically calls for the help of the Toad Patrol (TM). He is mentioned to be a mischief maker and apparently has a shadowy past with The Outsider, who - while arguably showing interest in him - never allows him to stay around her for long.

== Supporting characters and villains ==
- Erebus (voiced by Neil Shee) is one of the main villains of the series, he is (what appears to be) a hognose snake. He constantly hunts the Toad Patrol until the end of the second season. In the 14th episode, he seems to be sleepy until spring.
- Medea is the other main villain. She is obviously female due to her name and the main characters refer to her as "she". Medea has the appearance of an Osprey, a bird of prey that specializes in fish, but will evidently go after toadlets, too. Unlike most of the characters, Medea does not speak.
- The Outsider (voiced by Kate Hurman) is a female toad who was a member of The Ancients, she appeared to have a deep hatred or disliking to Mistle Toad when Beauty Stem became poisoned with kerosene, the Toad Patrol took her to The Outsider and shortly after their arrival to her home, she reminded Mistle Toad that he wasn't allowed in her home. She managed to heal Beauty Stem, and later in Season 2, she returned to help Beauty Stem and Slippery Jack when Panther Cap fell into frozen water and was in a comatose state. She later helped Panther Cap and Shaggy Mane when they were lost in the caverns. The Outsider's last appearance was in the Toadstool Caverns when she came to warn that Earth Star is transforming into a toadstool.
- Daphne (voiced by Anne K. Leger) is a female toad along with the tunnel toad and the old toad. She reappeared in the 25th episode to free Fur Foot while he got trapped.
- Calypso is a green frog whom Fur Foot is infatuated with (it might also be a possibility that she harbors the same feelings for him as well), she appears in Season 2 and shows the Toadlets how to get into Toad Hollow without the fairy ring via an underwater cavern. Later found one of the legendary instruments the toadlets were looking for. Puff Ball doesn't really like her that much. She is Barnaby's cousin.
- Juno is an old turtle who lives within the toadstool caverns, she usually gives the Toadlets good advice. The toad patrol helps her after she fell on her back.
- Phoebe is a pink lizard, possibly a salamander, who is a friend of Earth Star. Phoebe gives the toadlets shelter from the rain in episode 4 and lets them stay in her home. She can't swim and is afraid of water.
- Cleopatra is a female skunk who helped the Toad Patrol once; she only made two appearances throughout the show.
- Rosencrantz and Guildenstern are twin mice brothers who help Slippery Jack and Oyster reunite with the Toad Patrol after being taken away by humans. Afterward, the two brothers go into the forest searching for adventure. They are both dimwitted in a way.
- Barnaby (voiced by Norman Mikeal-Berketa) is a self-absorbed, self-centered, flamboyant green frog whom rarely cared about anyone but himself. He helped the Toad Patrol once from Medea, he led them across the river from Medea while hiding underneath decoys. He later returns in Season 2 to help Shaggy Mane save Mistle Toad from Erebus. He is Calypso's cousin.
- Digger is a mole who only looks out for himself.
- Lilac and Alstroemaria are two female, boisterous, spoiled, flying squirrels. They tell the Toadlets that they should be on the ground, never in their tree. but they encounter the Toadlets again when they tried to eat an extravagant woodpecker's acorn-infested tree, but were scared away by a Slothful Porcupine.
- Belisarius is king of the bats, he lives in a dark cave and likes to eat toads.
- Loki is a female otter who helped Fur Foot rescue Panther Cap when he fell into the frozen lake. She was filled with helpful advice and told the toadlets not to warm Panther Cap up too quickly otherwise he would have become worse being in comatose, and later she found one of the legendary instruments that the toadlets were looking for. She loves swimming, digging and sliding.
- Penny Bun was a female toadlet who lived in Toad Hollow and appeared to be friends with the Toad Patrol, however when Calypso led the Toad Patrol into Toad Hollow once more to retrieve Earth Star, Elf Cup was shocked to find him flirting with Penny Bun. Beauty Stem and Elf Cup later got revenge and threw him into a mud puddle after rescuing Juno.
- Snout and Ollie are two brother weasels who love to torture innocent toadlets.
- Green Eyes is a minor villain. He is a fox who enjoys eating Toadlets; he has only made three appearances and he has no dialogue.
- Artemis or "Artie", which he likes to be called, is a male goose who saved Fur Foot, Elf Cup and Panther Cap from Medea.
- Sigmund is a mute salamander and guardian of The Toadstool Caverns; she was given this job by the Ancients.
- Orpheus is a dastardly and hateful rat who tricks the Toad Patrol. He feels that he rules all the forest and is never afraid to repay a kind act with a mean trick.
- Tunnel Toad is an elderly male toad who watches the tunnels.
