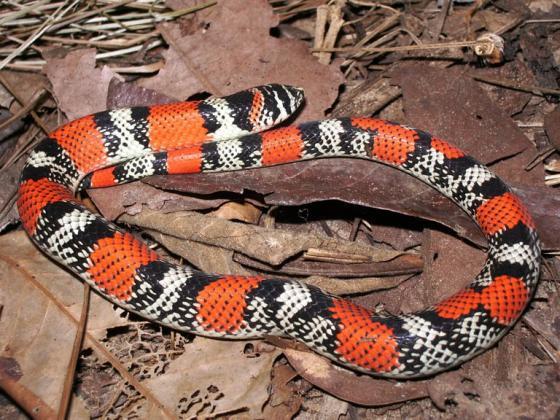

Conservation status
- Least Concern (IUCN 3.1)

Scientific classification
- Kingdom: Animalia
- Phylum: Chordata
- Class: Reptilia
- Order: Squamata
- Suborder: Serpentes
- Family: Colubridae
- Genus: Xenodon
- Species: X. matogrossensis

Binomial name
- Xenodon matogrossensis (Scrocchi & Cruz, 1993)

= Xenodon matogrossensis =

Species of snake

Xenodon matogrossensis, the Mato Grosso hognose snake, is a species of snake in the family Colubridae. It is endemic to Brazil.
