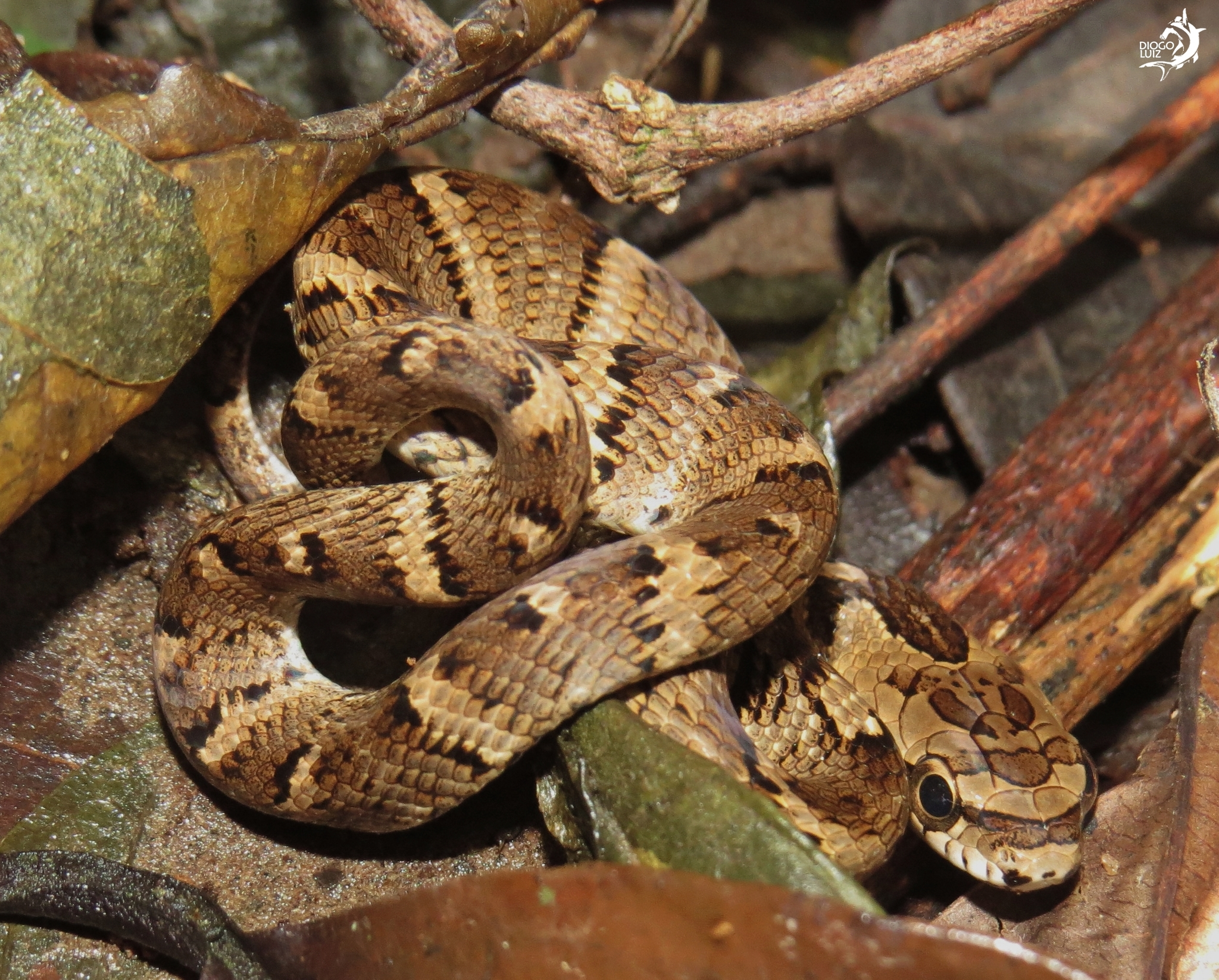

Conservation status
- Least Concern (IUCN 3.1)

Scientific classification
- Kingdom: Animalia
- Phylum: Chordata
- Class: Reptilia
- Order: Squamata
- Suborder: Serpentes
- Family: Colubridae
- Genus: Xenodon
- Species: X. neuwiedii

Binomial name
- Xenodon neuwiedii Günther, 1863

Synonyms
- Xenodon neovidii Cope, 1885; Xenodon hemileucurus A. Lutz & Mello Campos, 1922

= Xenodon neuwiedii =

Species of snake

Xenodon neuwiedii, also known commonly as Neuwied's false fer-de-lance, is a species of snake in the subfamily Dipsadinae of the family Colubridae. The species is native to eastern central South America.

== Etymology ==
The specific name, neuwiedii, is in honor of German naturalist Prince Maximilian of Wied-Neuwied.

== Geographic distribution ==
Xenodon neuwiedii is found in extreme northeastern Argentina, southeastern Brazil, and southeastern Paraguay.

== Habitat ==
The preferred natural habitat of Xenodon neuwiedii is forest.

== Behavior ==
Xenodon neuwiedii is terrestrial and diurnal.

== Diet ==
Xenodon neuwiedii preys predominately upon toads, but also upon other frogs.

== Reproduction ==
Xenodon neuwiedii is oviparous.
