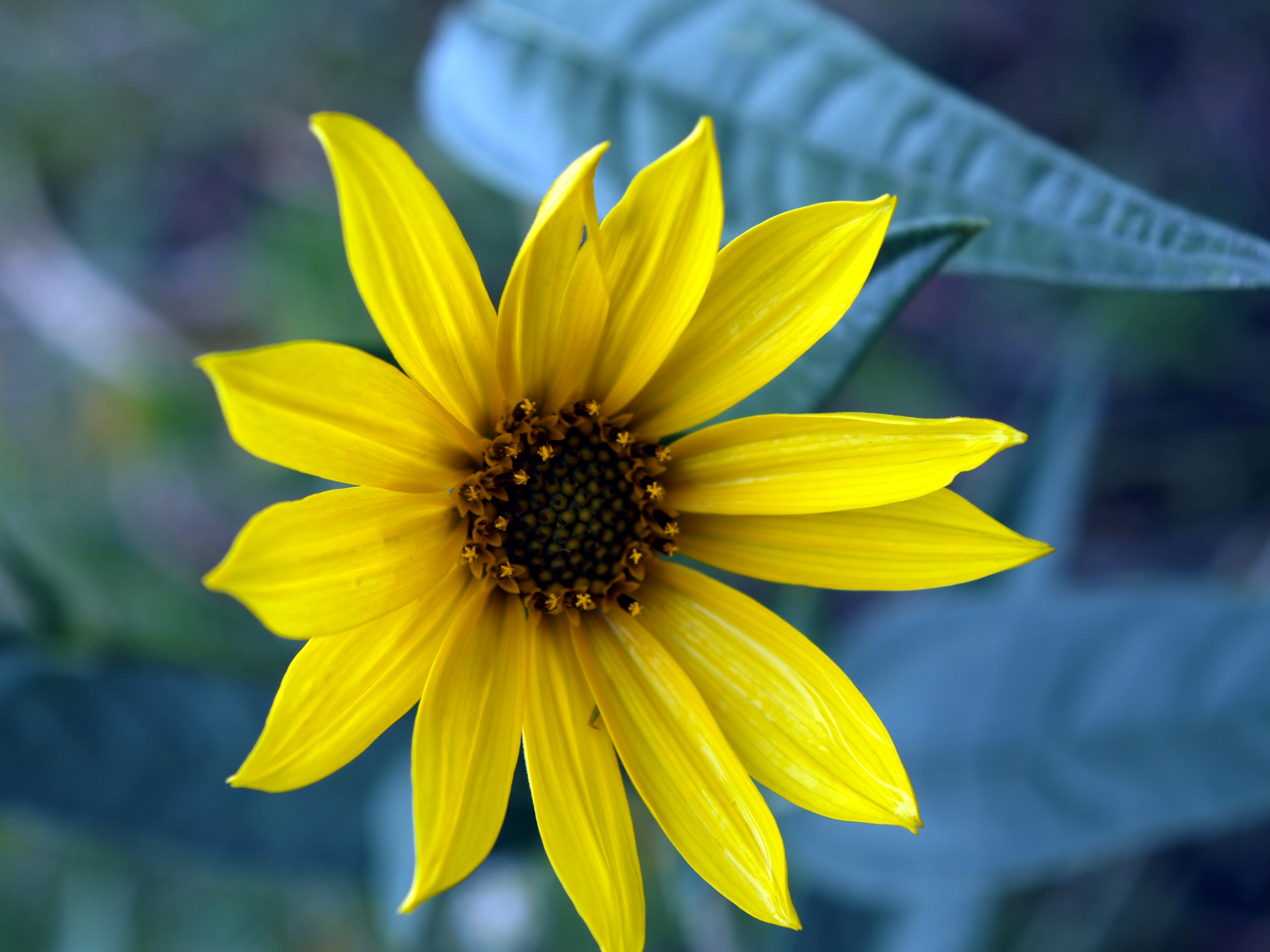
- Wind Cave National Park, South Dakota

Conservation status
- Least Concern (IUCN 3.1)

- Secure (NatureServe)

Scientific classification
- Kingdom: Plantae
- Clade: Embryophytes
- Clade: Tracheophytes
- Clade: Angiosperms
- Clade: Eudicots
- Clade: Asterids
- Order: Asterales
- Family: Asteraceae
- Tribe: Heliantheae
- Genus: Helianthus
- Species: H. maximiliani

Binomial name
- Helianthus maximiliani Schrad.

Synonyms
- Helianthus dalyi Britton; Helianthus maximilianii Schrad.

= Helianthus maximiliani =

Species of sunflower

Helianthus maximiliani is a North American species of sunflower known by the common name Maximilian sunflower.

This sunflower is named for Prince Maximilian of Wied-Neuwied, who encountered it on his travels in North America.

Helianthus maximiliani is native to the Great Plains in central North America, and naturalized in the eastern and western parts of the continent. It is now found from British Columbia to Maine, south to the Carolinas, Chihuahua, and California. The plant thrives in a number of ecosystems, particularly across the plains in central Canada and the United States. It is also cultivated as an ornamental.

== Description ==
A branching perennial herb, growing from a stout rhizome and reaches heights from 0.5–3.0 m (1 1/2–10 ft). The rough, slender, tall, erect stems and alternately arranged leaves are covered in rough hairs.

The lance-shaped leaves are narrow, rough, pointed, and folded down the midvein, and up to 30 cm (12 in) long on large plants.

The flower heads are surrounded at the base by pointed green phyllaries which often stick straight out and curl at the tips. The center is filled with yellow tipped brown disc florets and the circumference is lined with bright yellow ray florets 2–4 cm (1–1 1/2 in) long. The flowers give an odor similar to chocolate.

The plant reproduces by seed and by vegetative sprouting from the rhizome.

== Uses ==
The thick rhizome is edible and provided a food similar to the Jerusalem artichoke for Native American groups such as the Sioux. The flower heads are attractive to insects and the fruits are eaten by birds. Livestock eat portions of the plant, and the seeds are eaten by various wildlife.

The Land Institute, a perennial agriculture research center located in Salina, Kansas, run by Wes Jackson is experimenting with this species to create a perennial oilseed grain crop that does not necessitate replanting each season.
