= Xenodon guentheri =

Conservation status
- Least Concern (IUCN 3.1)

Scientific classification
- Kingdom: Animalia
- Phylum: Chordata
- Class: Reptilia
- Order: Squamata
- Suborder: Serpentes
- Family: Colubridae
- Genus: Xenodon
- Species: X. guentheri

Binomial name
- Xenodon guentheri Boulenger, 1894

Species of snake

Xenodon guentheri, also known commonly as Günther's false fer-de-lance, is a species of snake in the subfamily Dipsadinae of the family Colubridae. The species is endemic to Brazil.

== Etymology ==
The specific name, guentheri, is in honor of German-British herpetologist Albert Günther.

== Common names ==
X. guentheri is known by several common names in Brazilian Portuguese including boipeva, chata, cobra-chata, and jararaca-falsa.

== Geographic range ==
X. guentheri is found in southern Brazil, in the Brazilian states of Paraná, Rio Grande do Sul, and Santa Catarina.

== Habitat ==
The preferred natural habitat of X. guentheri is Araucaria angustifolia forest, at altitudes of 600–1,600 m (2,000–5,200 ft).

== Defensive Behavior ==
When threatened, X. guentheri may exhibit defensive behaviors including body flattening, tail display, head triangulation, and fleeing.

== Reproduction ==
X. guentheri is oviparous.
