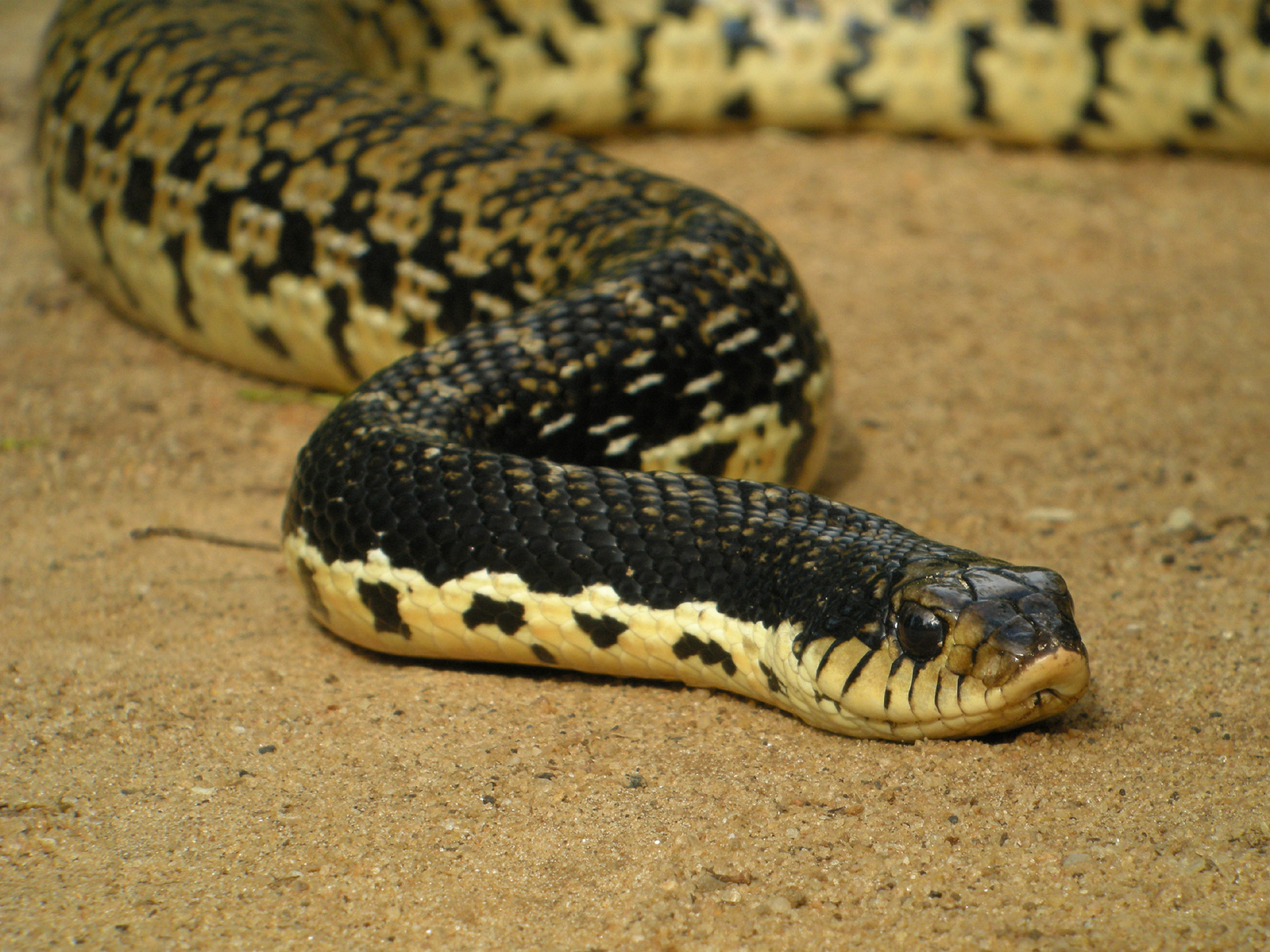
- At Kirindy Mitea National Park, Madagascar.
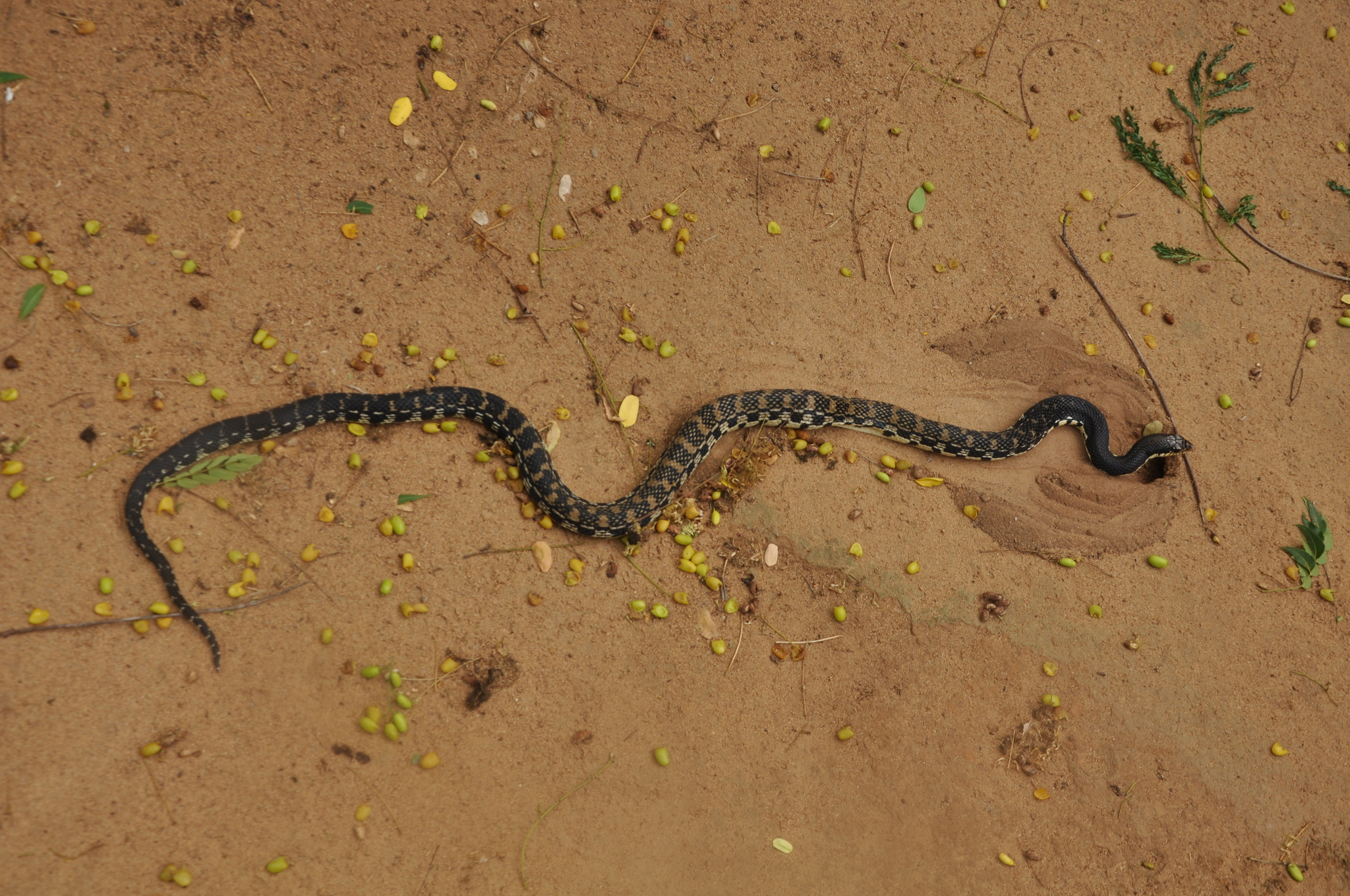
- In Morondava, Madagascar

Conservation status
- Least Concern (IUCN 3.1)

Scientific classification
- Kingdom: Animalia
- Phylum: Chordata
- Class: Reptilia
- Order: Squamata
- Suborder: Serpentes
- Family: Pseudoxyrhophiidae
- Genus: Leioheterodon
- Species: L. madagascariensis

Binomial name
- Leioheterodon madagascariensis Duméril & Bibron, 1854

= Leioheterodon madagascariensis =

Malagasy giant hognose snake

Species of snake

Leioheterodon madagascariensis, the Malagasy, Madagascar or Madagascan giant hognose (snake), is a harmless species of pseudoxyrhophiid snake endemic to the island nation of Madagascar. The species is also found on the country's smaller islands of Nosy Be, Nosy Mangabe, and Nosy Sakatia, as well as on the Comoros archipelago, in the Mozambique Channel. It is thought, by some, to have been introduced to the Grande Comoro. Mature giant hognose snakes can measure between 130 and 180 cm (4 ft. to nearly 6 ft., or between 1-2 meters) in length, and be roughly the thickness of an average adult human's arm.

Similarly to the Heterodon or Lystrophis genera of new-world hognoses, the Madagascar giant hognose, when threatened, will raise its head, open its mouth and inflate the skin around its neck and chin, superficially mimicking a cobra (or even a bearded dragon) in defensive posture, in an attempt to look larger and more intimidating. This snake is opisthoglyphous (rear-fanged), as it possess a pair of pin-like, widely spaced teeth at either side of the back of the mouth, connected to the maxilla.

Through a funnel-like formation in each tooth, hognose snakes can inject a paralyzing saliva to subdue their prey. Studies have shown that the giant hognose does not use this "envenomation" technique to outright kill their prey, instead relying mainly on constriction. Thus the placement of these teeth at the rear of the mouth (combined with their ability to deliver a paralyzing/toxic salival fluid) aids the snake in controlling "squirmy" prey, as the animal will potentially take longer to expire by constriction, compared to a single, deadly bite from a highly-venomous snake species.

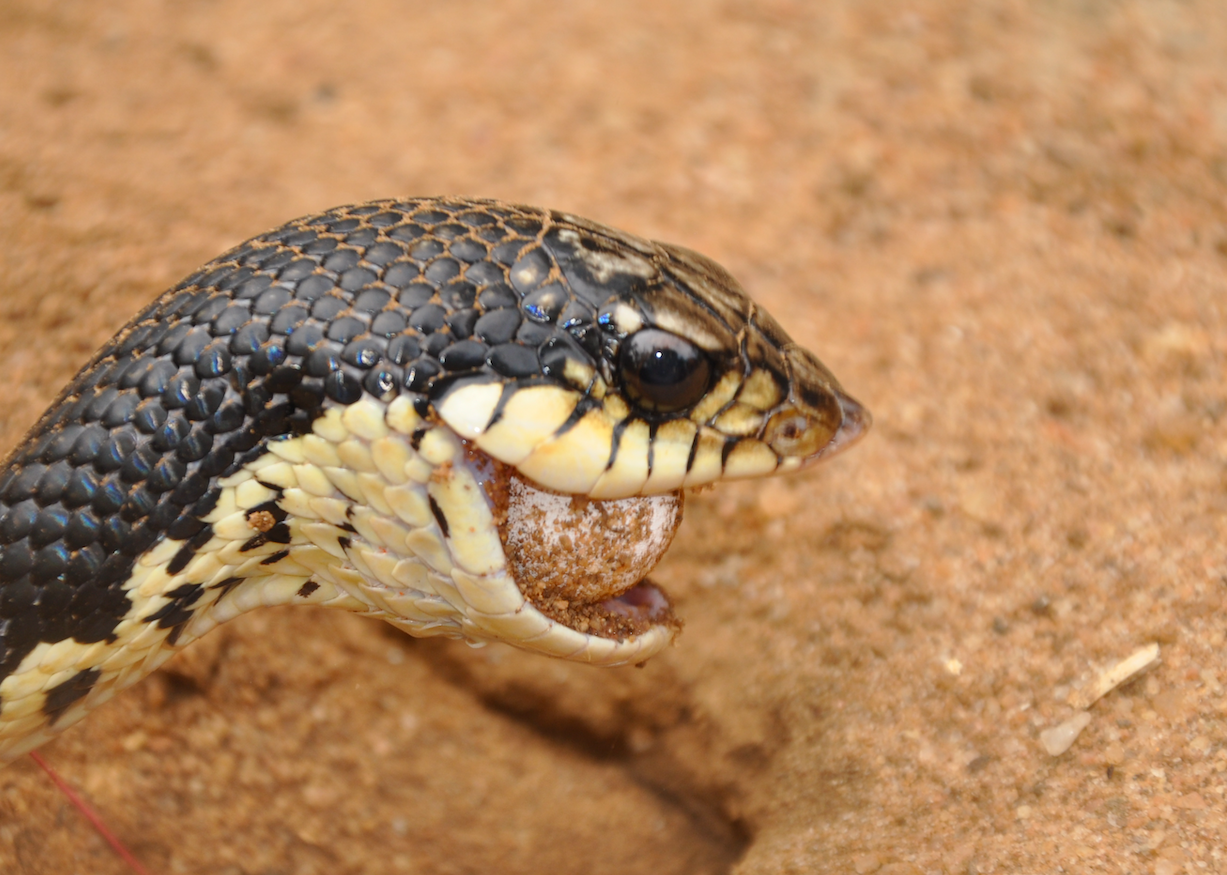
Feeding on Oplurus eggs.

For these reasons, the physical presence of the Duvernoy's gland is unclear in this species. The toxic saliva, while effective at controlling wriggling small animals, only irritates human skin and is not deadly. Furthermore, most hognoses are not prone to bite large mammals—including humans—as their teeth are placed far in the back of the mouth, requiring the snake to exert somewhat greater effort during a bite than other, "frontal-fanged" snakes (elapids, vipers, colubrids). Typical prey consists of various small reptiles, frogs, toads, birds, and their nestlings and eggs. Other smaller snakes may be eaten occasionally, as well as small mammals, such as rodents, tenrecs or mouse lemurs and their offspring.

The primary predators of the Madagascar giant hognose snake are birds of prey and other avian species with a taste for snakes. Additionally, some mongooses and even the fossa, Madagascar's largest mammalian carnivore, may consume snakes; though the fossa is rather opportunistic in its diet, its specialty is hunting lemurs. Above all, the people of Madagascar, being highly superstitious and wary of evil spirits, still remain the giant hognose snake's biggest threat. Many Madagascar giant hognose snakes are killed on-sight, either being beheaded or otherwise dismembered; they are nearly universally-disliked on the island, despite being of no threat to human life or limb.
