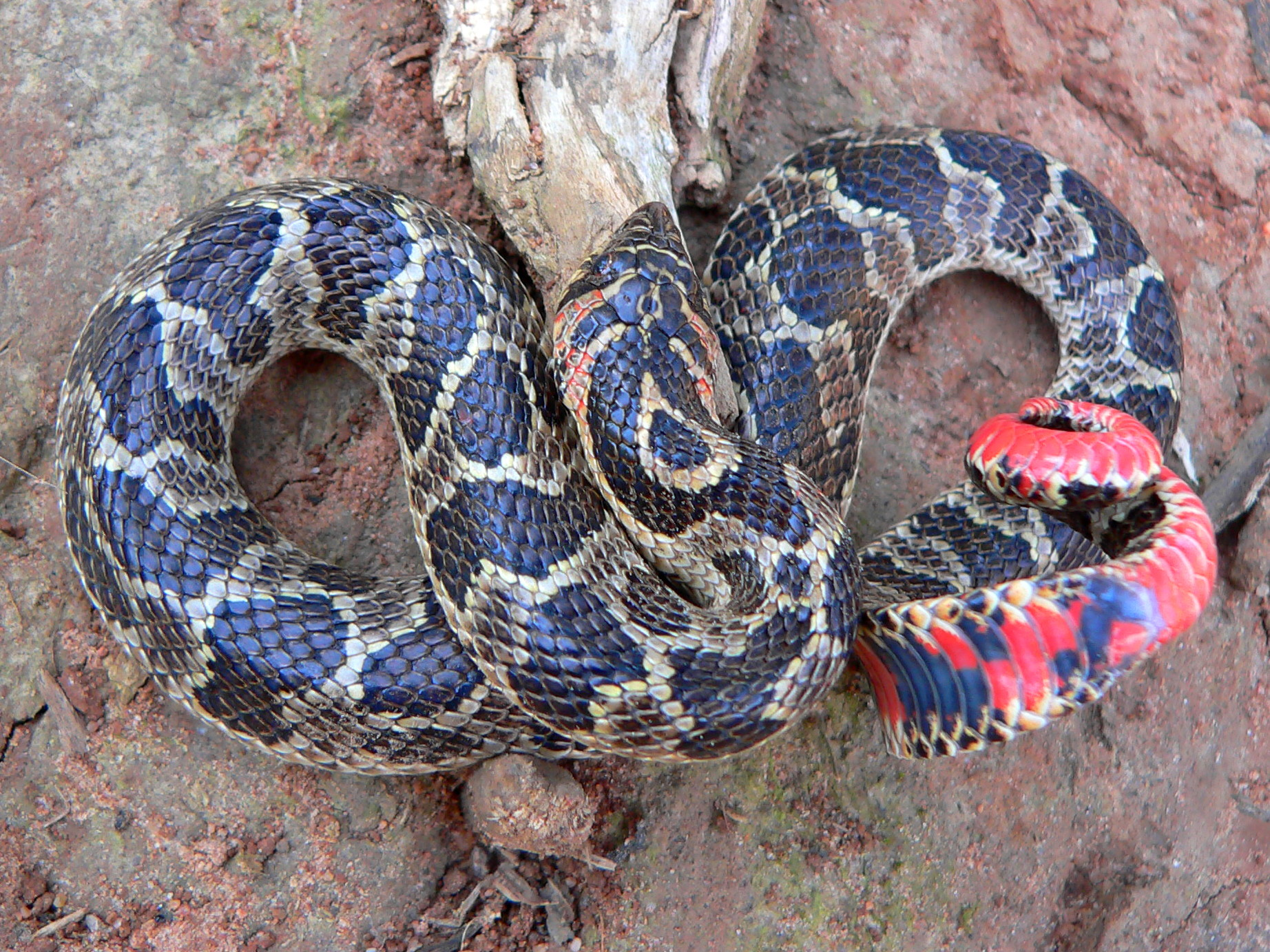

Conservation status
- Least Concern (IUCN 3.1)

Scientific classification
- Kingdom: Animalia
- Phylum: Chordata
- Class: Reptilia
- Order: Squamata
- Suborder: Serpentes
- Family: Colubridae
- Genus: Xenodon
- Species: X. dorbignyi

Binomial name
- Xenodon dorbignyi (Bibron, 1854)

Synonyms
- Heterodon dorbignyi Bibron, 1854; Lystrophis dorbignyi — Cope, 1885; Xenodon dorbignyi — Zaher et al., 2009

= Xenodon dorbignyi =

Species of snake

Xenodon dorbignyi, known commonly as the South American hognose snake, is a species of snake in the family Colubridae. The species is native to South America, being found in Argentina, Brazil, Paraguay and Uruguay. It has four recognized subspecies.

== Taxonomy ==
The first description of the species was published in 1854 by Gabriel Bibron, who placed it in the genus Heterodon. The specific name, dorbignyi, is in honor of French naturalist Alcide d'Orbigny. Edward Drinker Cope moved the species to Lystrophis in 1885, and it was subsequently moved to Xenodon in 1994 by Thales de Lema when he divided the species into four subspecies.

The four subspecies are X. d. dorbignyi, the nominotypical subspecies, X. d. chacoensis, named after the Chaco region of Argentina, X. d. orientalis, its name being Latin for 'eastern' in reference to its distribution, and X. d. uruguayensis, named after Uruguay.

== Description ==
X. dorbignyi may attain a total length of 56 cm (22 in), including a tail 8 cm (3.1 in) long. It resembles the sympatric venomous snake Bothrops alternatus.

== Diet ==
X. dorbignyi preys upon insects, amphibians, and lizards.

== Reproduction ==
X. dorbignyi is oviparous.

== Distribution and habitat ==
X. dorbignyi is found in northeast Argentina, southern Brazil, southern Paraguay and all of Uruguay. It has a preference for habitats with sandy soils that it can burrow into, and is found in both open grassland and montane forests, with a range spanning multiple ecoregions, including the Gran Chaco, the Humid Chaco, the Pampas and the Alto Paraná Atlantic forests. In Uruguay it has also been found living in urban areas.

The 2014 IUCN Red List assessment of X. dorbignyi deemed it to be a least-concern species on the basis of its large distribution and a lack of known threats.

== Gallery ==
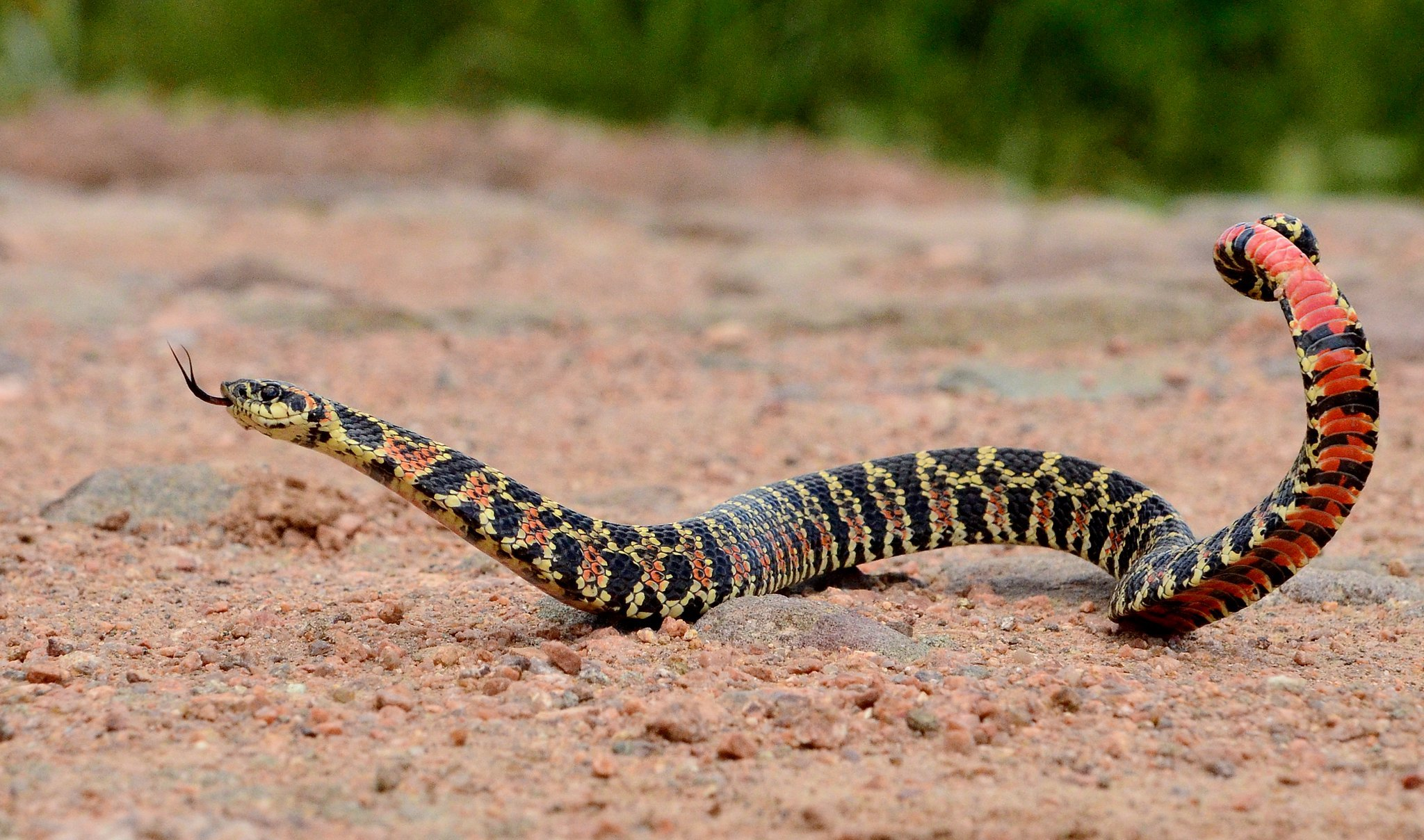

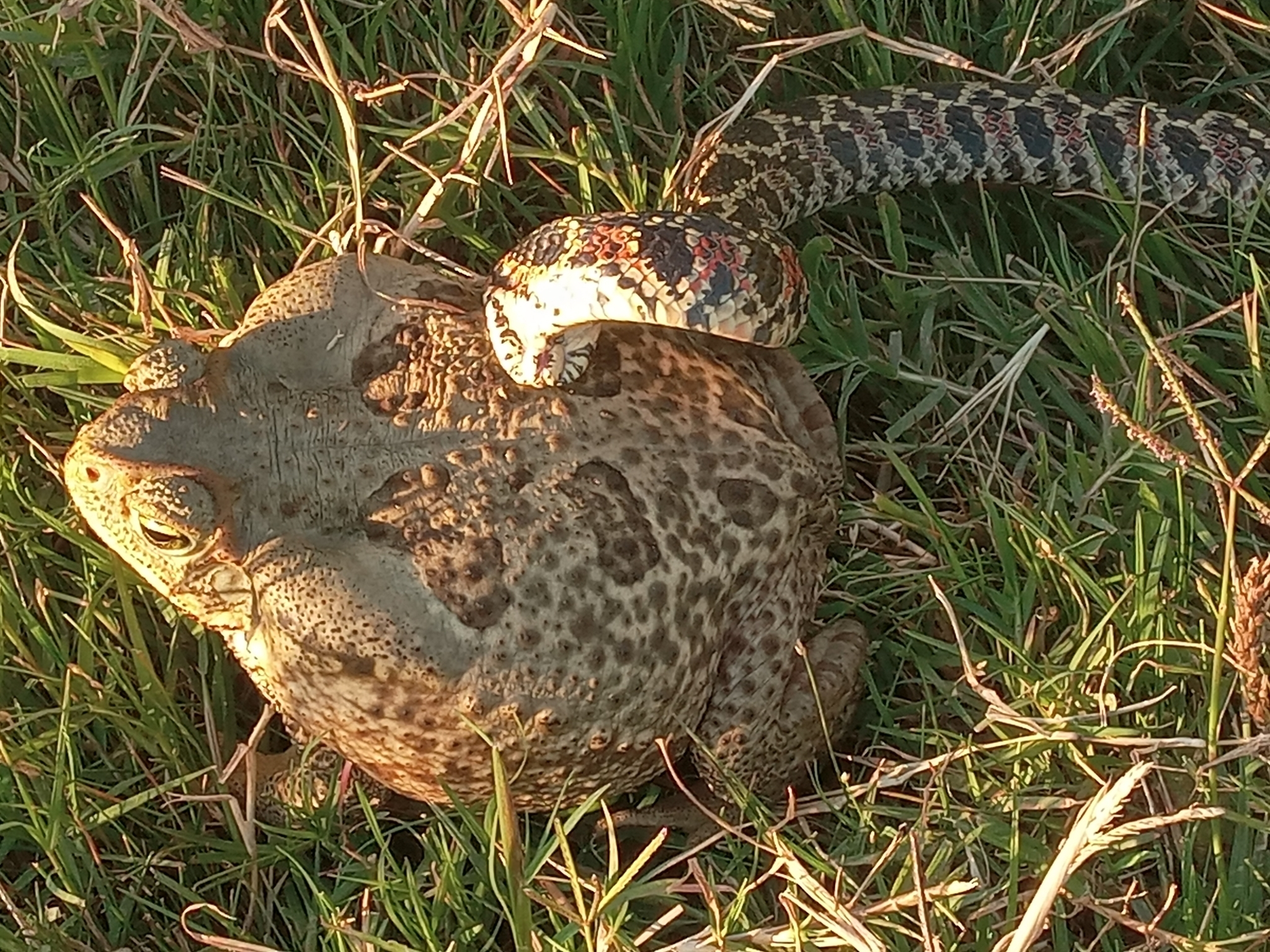
Trying to eat a cururu toad
