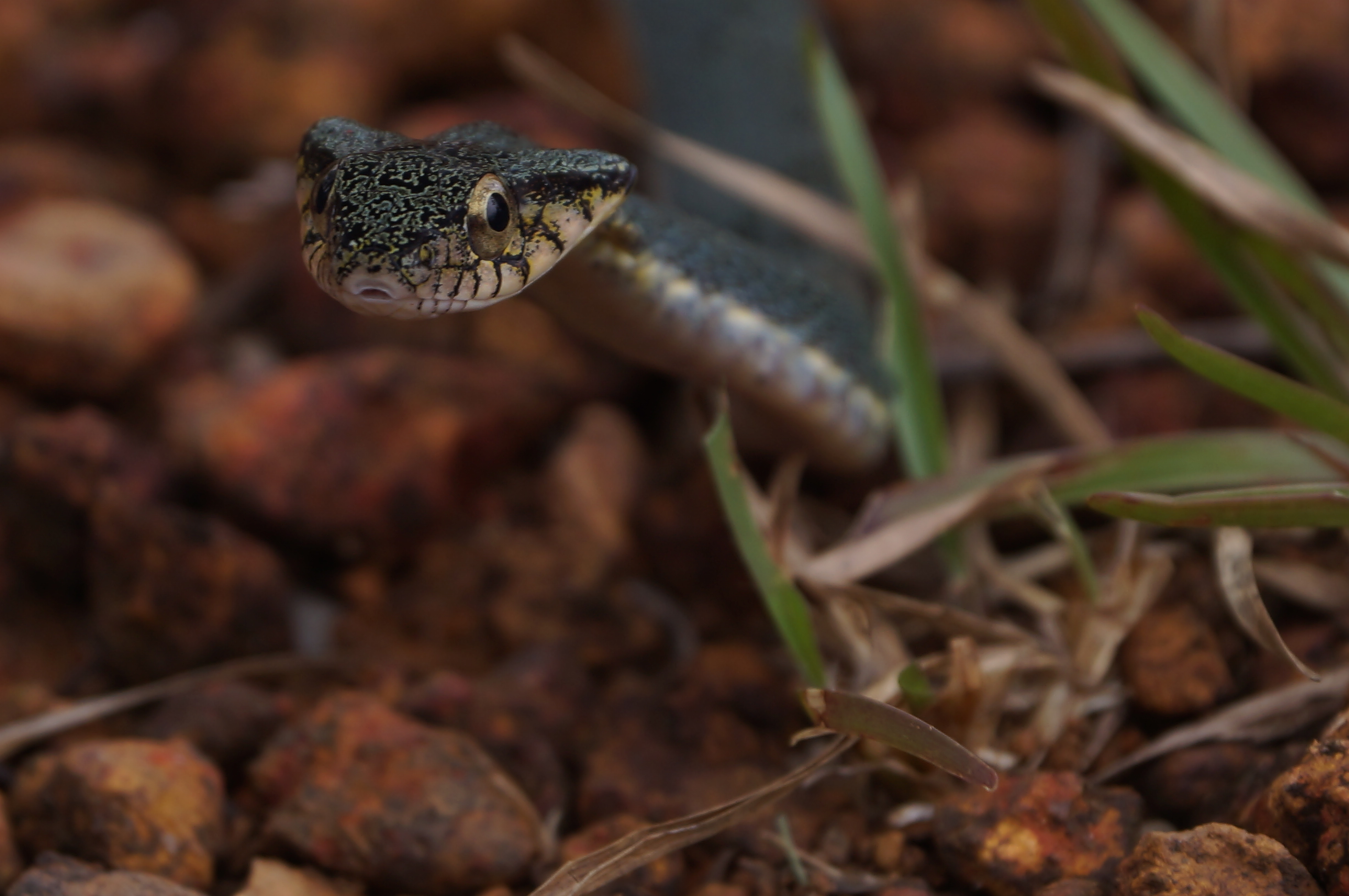

Conservation status
- Least Concern (IUCN 3.1)

Scientific classification
- Kingdom: Animalia
- Phylum: Chordata
- Class: Reptilia
- Order: Squamata
- Suborder: Serpentes
- Family: Colubridae
- Genus: Xenodon
- Species: X. werneri

Binomial name
- Xenodon werneri Eiselt, 1963

= Xenodon werneri =

Species of snake

Xenodon werneri is a species of snake in the family Colubridae. It is found in Brazil and French Guiana.
