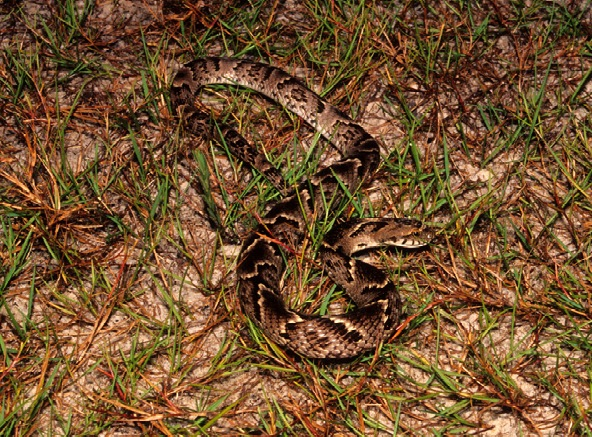
- Xenodon merremii

Scientific classification
- Kingdom: Animalia
- Phylum: Chordata
- Class: Reptilia
- Order: Squamata
- Suborder: Serpentes
- Family: Colubridae
- Subfamily: Dipsadinae
- Genus: Xenodon; H. Boie, 1826

= Xenodon =

Genus of snakes

Xenodon is a genus of New World snakes in the subfamily Dipsadinae of the family Colubridae.

== Geographic range ==
Species of the genus Xenodon are found in Mexico, Central America, and South America.

== Diet ==
Snakes in the genus Xenodon prey almost exclusively on toads.

== Species ==
The following 12 species are recognized as being valid.

- Xenodon dorbignyi (Bibron in A.M.C. Duméril, Bibron & A.H.A. Duméril, 1854) – South American hognose snake
- Xenodon guentheri Boulenger, 1894 – Günther's false fer-de-lance
- Xenodon histricus (Jan, 1863) – Jan's hognose snake
- Xenodon matogrossensis (Scrocchi & Cruz, 1993)
- Xenodon merremii (Wagler, 1824) – Wagler's snake
- Xenodon nattereri (Steindachner, 1867)
- Xenodon neuwiedii Günther, 1863 – Neuwied's false fer-de-lance
- Xenodon pulcher (Jan, 1863)
- Xenodon rabdocephalus (Wied, 1824) – false fer-de-lance
- Xenodon semicinctus (A.M.C. Duméril, Bibron & A.H.A. Duméril, 1854) – ringed hognose snake
- Xenodon severus (Linnaeus, 1758) – Amazon false fer-de-lance
- Xenodon werneri Eiselt, 1963

Nota bene: A binomial authority in parentheses indicates that the species was originally described in a genus other than Xenodon.
