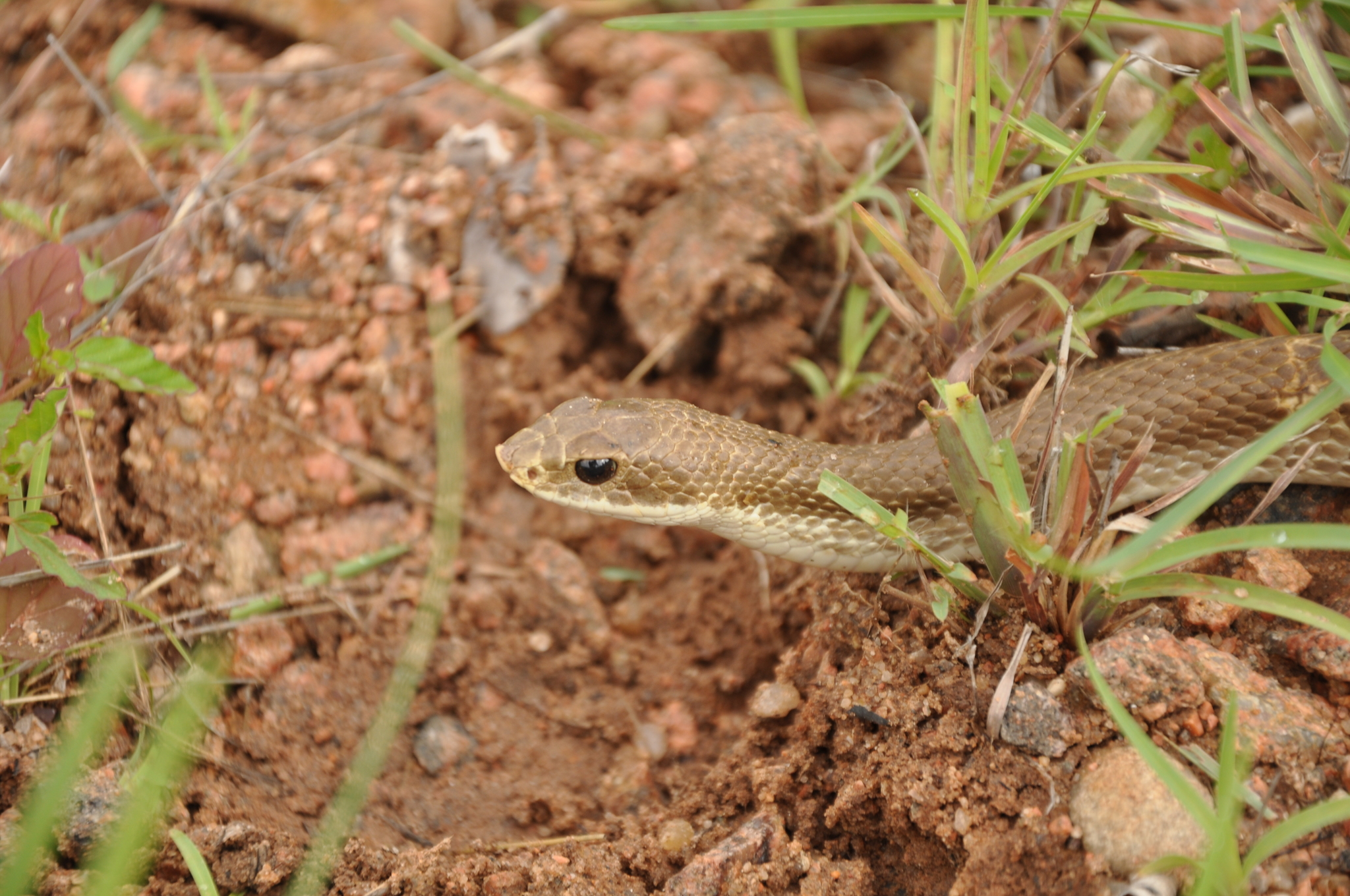

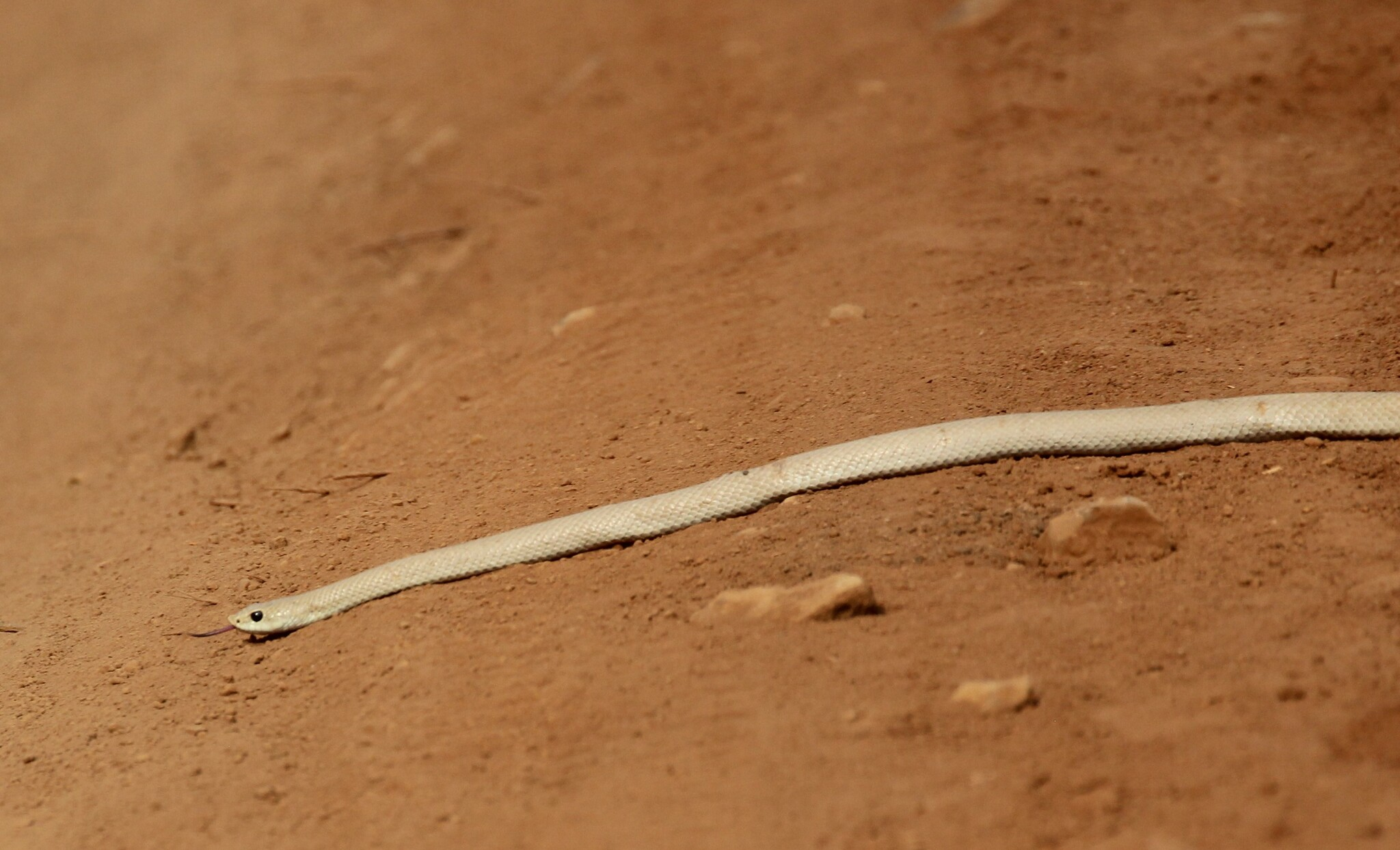

Conservation status
- Least Concern (IUCN 3.1)

Scientific classification
- Kingdom: Animalia
- Phylum: Chordata
- Class: Reptilia
- Order: Squamata
- Suborder: Serpentes
- Family: Pseudoxyrhophiidae
- Genus: Leioheterodon
- Species: L. modestus

Binomial name
- Leioheterodon modestus (Günther, 1863)

Synonyms
- Heterodon modestus Günther, 1863; Lioheterodon modestus (Günther, 1863)

= Leioheterodon modestus =

Species of snake

Leioheterodon modestus, also known as the blonde hognose snake or the Madagascan golden hognose, is a species of rear-fanged (opisthoglyphous) snake in the family Pseudoxyrhophiidae (previously considered a subfamily of Colubridae). Leioheterodon are the largest hognose snakes in the world, and L. modestus is endemic to Madagascar. Regarding conservation and population, it is considered a species of least concern.

== Distribution and habitat ==
These snakes are a semi-fossorial diurnal species that can be found in forests, on the edges of forests, human-altered areas and disrupted habitats. While some populations have been described as being restricted to thick forests and forest fragments, other literature on Leioheterodon modestus shows a generally patchy distribution within central, western and southern Madagascar. They can be found during both rainy and dry season in forests, as well as on forest edges, in open areas and in anthropogenic (human-altered) environments.

They are endemic to Madagascar. Multiple accounts describe this species being found in elevations between 40–300 m (130–980 ft). However, one account describes two individuals 200 km east of their known range, as well as at an elevation of 1,280 m (4,200 ft) and 1,460 m (4,790 ft), respectively, extending the range of the species. They have been documented using rock caverns and limestone massifs, and also on multiple occasions occupying ant hills. This species is not well distributed throughout Madagascar and there is a lot of habitat fragmentation within their range. Due to this, they only reliably occur in few localities.

== Biology ==
=== Diet ===
Leioheterodon modestus primarily eats amphibians as well as other reptiles, notably the rainbow frog (Scaphiophryne gottlebei). Though there is not a lot of information known about their diet in the wild, captive individuals are known to have a more varied diet than North American hognoses (Heterodon spp.), which are more restricted to amphibians. In captivity, L. modestus are known to eat toads, frogs, lizards, small mammals, and even the eggs of other reptiles.

=== Reproduction ===
These snakes are oviparous (egg-laying).

== Morphology ==
Leioheterodon modestus is a smooth-scaled snake with a slightly pointed, projecting snout. Their eyes are large with round pupils. Hatchlings average between 6–12 in (15–30 cm), and adults average around 3–5 ft (91–152 cm) in length. They are named after the Latin word modestus, meaning "modest", for their plain, pale yellow-brown coloration. The mineralized skeleton of this species of snake contains apatite. The three species within the genus Leioheterodon are morphologically similar, and Leioheterodon spp. have been known to do elaborate defensive displays when threatened by predators; a common behavior in many hognose species. These defensive displays include hissing, flattening of the neck, feign striking and death feigning. Adults display sexual dimorphism between males and females, however this is very subtle with males just being slightly larger. This is because adult males perform male-male combat, where two males try to pin each other down in a ritualistic behavior for dominance of an area or for mating rights with a female.

=== Dentition ===
This species is rear-fanged and considered mildly venomous, although they are not medically significant to humans (with anaphylaxis always being an exception if someone is allergic). Generally they are harmless. Their venom is only used to subdue prey, and envenomation in humans only occurs from the snake being provoked. Their dentition lacks grooved teeth or fangs for venom delivery, and the "rear-fanged" refers to the ungrooved, enlarged rear teeth (on the posterior end of the maxilla).
