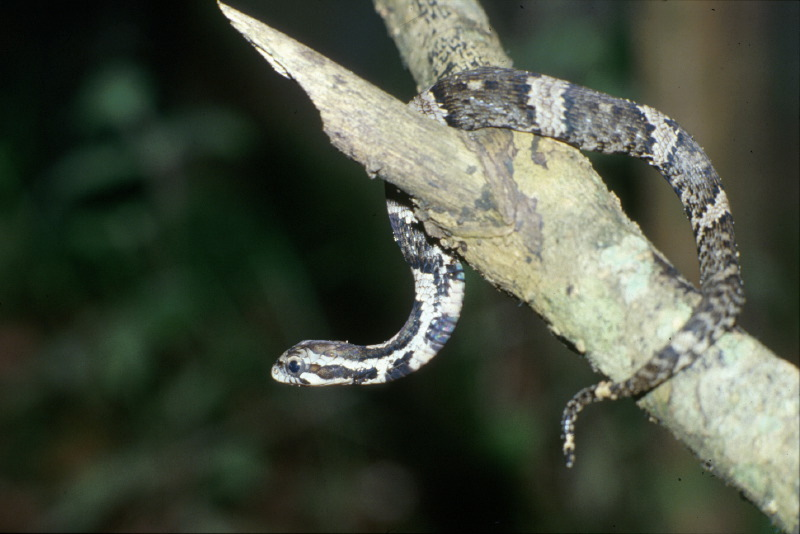

Conservation status
- Least Concern (IUCN 3.1)

Scientific classification
- Kingdom: Animalia
- Phylum: Chordata
- Class: Reptilia
- Order: Squamata
- Suborder: Serpentes
- Family: Colubridae
- Genus: Xenodon
- Species: X. severus

Binomial name
- Xenodon severus Linnaeus, 1758

= Xenodon severus =

Species of snake

Xenodon severus, the Amazon false fer-de-lance, is a species of snake in the family Dipsadidae. It is found in South America.
