= Blasius Merrem =

German naturalist and mathematician

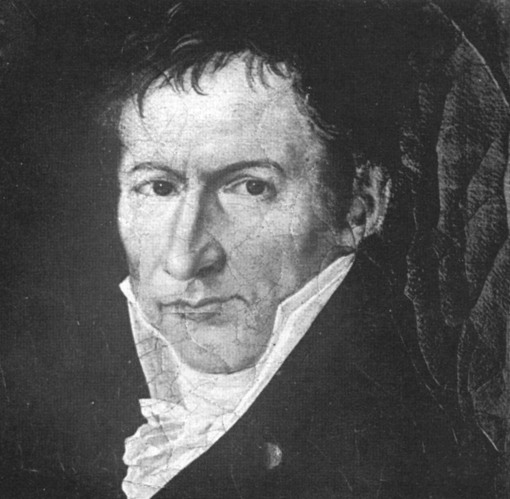
- Born: 4 February 1761; Bremen, Germany
- Died: 23 February 1824 (aged 63)
- Occupations: Naturalist, zoologist

Blasius Merrem (4 February 1761 – 23 February 1824) was a German naturalist, zoologist, ornithologist, mathematician, and herpetologist. In 1804, he became the professor of political economy and botany at the University of Marburg.

== Early life ==
Merrem was born at Bremen, and studied at the University of Göttingen under Johann Friedrich Blumenbach. He developed an interest in zoology, particularly ornithology.

== Ornithology ==
He is remembered chiefly as the first ornithologist to propose a division of birds into Ratitae (ratites or running birds, with a flat sternum) and Carinatae (carinates or flying birds, with a keeled sternum), which formed part of his classification of birds in Tentamen Systematis Naturalis Avium, published in Berlin in 1816 (in Abhandlugen Akad. Wiss. Berlin 1812–1813: Phys. Kl.).

== Herpetology ==
Similarly, in his 1820 opus, Versuch eines Systems der Amphibien, he was the first scientist to accurately separate amphibians from reptiles, to separate crocodilians from lizards, and to combine lizards and snakes in a single order.

Merrem is honored in the scientific names of two South American snakes: the subspecies Erythrolamprus miliaris merremi, and the species Xenodon merremii.

== Works ==
- De animalibus Scythicis apud Plinium (1781). (in Latin).
- Vermischte Abhandlungen aus der Thiergeschichte (1781). (in German).
- Beyträge zur besondern Geschichte der Vögel gesammelt (1784-1786). (in German).
- Avium rariorum et minus cognitarum icones et descriptiones (1786). (in Latin).
- Beitraege zur Naturgeschichte (1790-1821). (in German).
- Reise nach Paris im August und September, 1798 (1800). (in German).
- Index plantarum horti academici Marburgensis (1807). (in Latin).
- Handbuch der Pflanzenkunde nach dem Linneischen System (1809). (in German).
- Versuch eines Systems der Amphibien: Tentamen Systematis Amphibiorum (1820). (in German and Latin).
