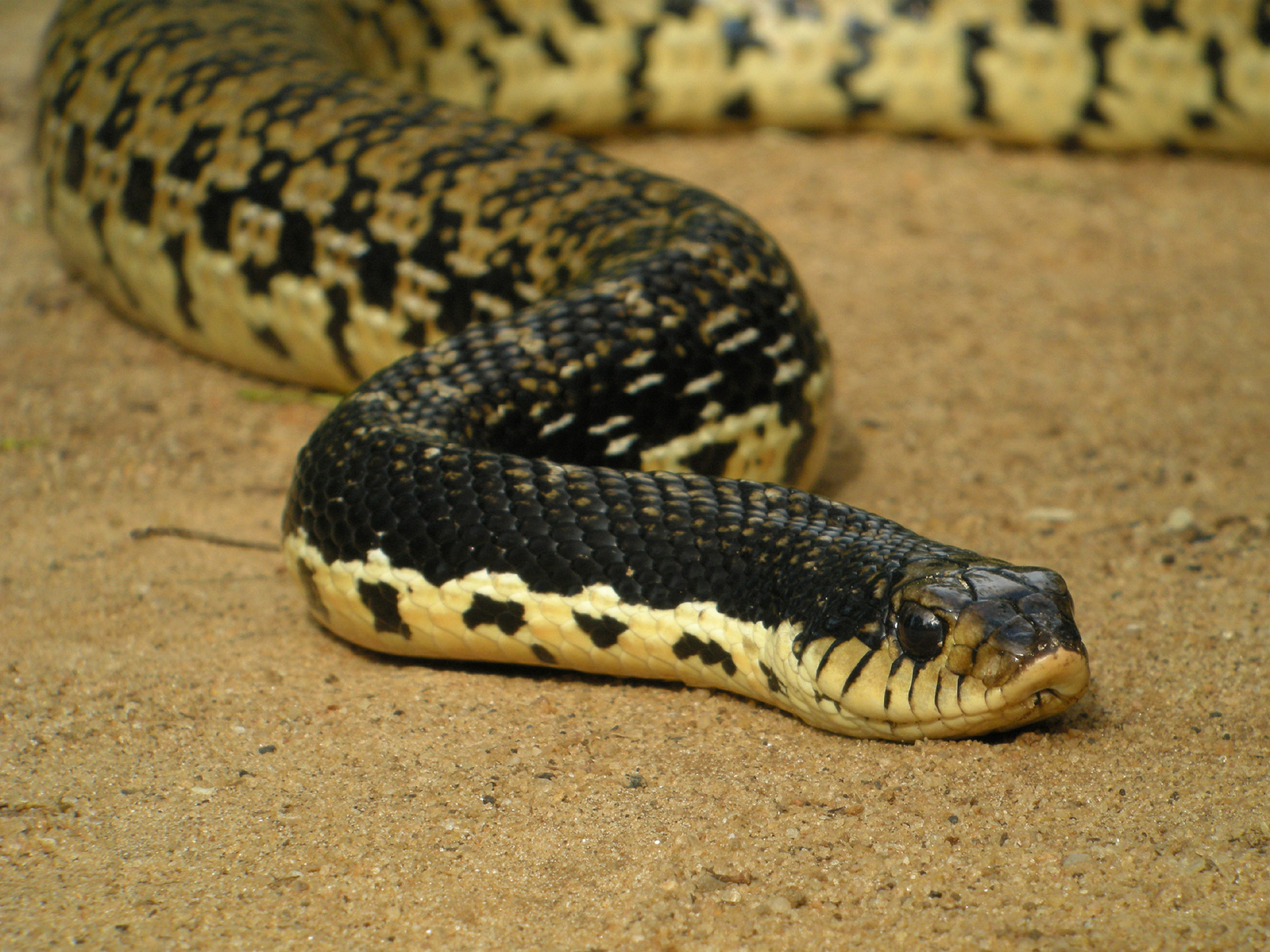
- Giant Malagasy hognose snake L. madagascariensis

Scientific classification
- Domain: Eukaryota
- Kingdom: Animalia
- Phylum: Chordata
- Class: Reptilia
- Order: Squamata
- Suborder: Serpentes
- Family: Pseudoxyrhophiidae
- Subfamily: Pseudoxyrhophiinae
- Genus: Leioheterodon; Duméril & Bibron, 1844

= Leioheterodon =

Genus of snakes

Leioheterodon is a genus of harmless pseudoxyrhophiid snakes found only on the island of Madagascar. Three species are currently recognized. Common names include Malagasy hognose snakes, Malagasy brown snakes and Malagasy menarana snakes.

== Species ==
Image	Species	Common name
	Leioheterodon geayi (Mocquard, 1905)	Speckled hognose snake
	Leioheterodon madagascariensis (Duméril & Bibron, 1854)	Malagasy giant hognose snake
	Leioheterodon modestus (Günther, 1863)	Blonde hognose snake
