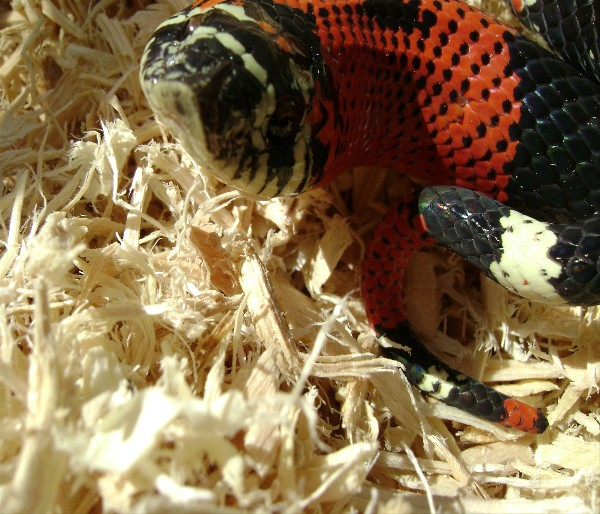

Conservation status
- Least Concern (IUCN 3.1)

Scientific classification
- Kingdom: Animalia
- Phylum: Chordata
- Class: Reptilia
- Order: Squamata
- Suborder: Serpentes
- Family: Colubridae
- Genus: Xenodon
- Species: X. semicinctus

Binomial name
- Xenodon semicinctus (A.M.C. Duméril, Bibron, & A.H.A. Duméril, 1854)

= Xenodon semicinctus =

Species of snake

Xenodon semicinctus, the ringed hognose snake, is a species of snake in the family, Colubridae. It is found in Argentina and Bolivia.
