= Xenodon histricus =

Conservation status
- Least Concern (IUCN 3.1)

Scientific classification
- Kingdom: Animalia
- Phylum: Chordata
- Class: Reptilia
- Order: Squamata
- Suborder: Serpentes
- Family: Colubridae
- Genus: Xenodon
- Species: X. histricus

Binomial name
- Xenodon histricus (Jan, 1863)

Species of snake

Xenodon histricus, Jan's hognose snake, is a species of snake in the family, Colubridae. It is found in Paraguay, Brazil, Argentina, and Uruguay.
