= Leioheterodon geayi =

Conservation status
- Least Concern (IUCN 3.1)

Scientific classification
- Kingdom: Animalia
- Phylum: Chordata
- Class: Reptilia
- Order: Squamata
- Suborder: Serpentes
- Family: Pseudoxyrhophiidae
- Genus: Leioheterodon
- Species: L. geayi

Binomial name
- Leioheterodon geayi Mocquard, 1905

Synonyms
- Lioheterodon [sic] geayi Mocquard, 1905; Lioheterodon voeltzkowi Boettger, 1913; Leioheterodon geayi — Glaw & Vences, 1994

Species of snake

Leioheterodon geayi, commonly known as Geay's hognose snake, the Madagascan speckled hognose snake, and the speckled hognose snake, is a species of mildly venomous snake in the family Lamprophiidae. The species is native to southwestern Madagascar.

== Etymology ==
The specific name, geayi, is in honor of French naturalist Martin François Geay (1859-1910) who collected the type specimen.

== Habitat ==
The preferred natural habitats of L. geayi are forest, savanna, and sandy areas, but it has also been found in pastures and villages.

== Description ==
L. geayi can grow to a total length (including tail) of 90–140 cm (35–55 in).

It is an opisthoglyphous ("rear-fanged") snake, having a pair of enlarged teeth at the rear of each maxilla (upper jaw).

== Behavior ==
L. geayi is terrestrial and diurnal.

== Reproduction ==
L. geayi is oviparous.
