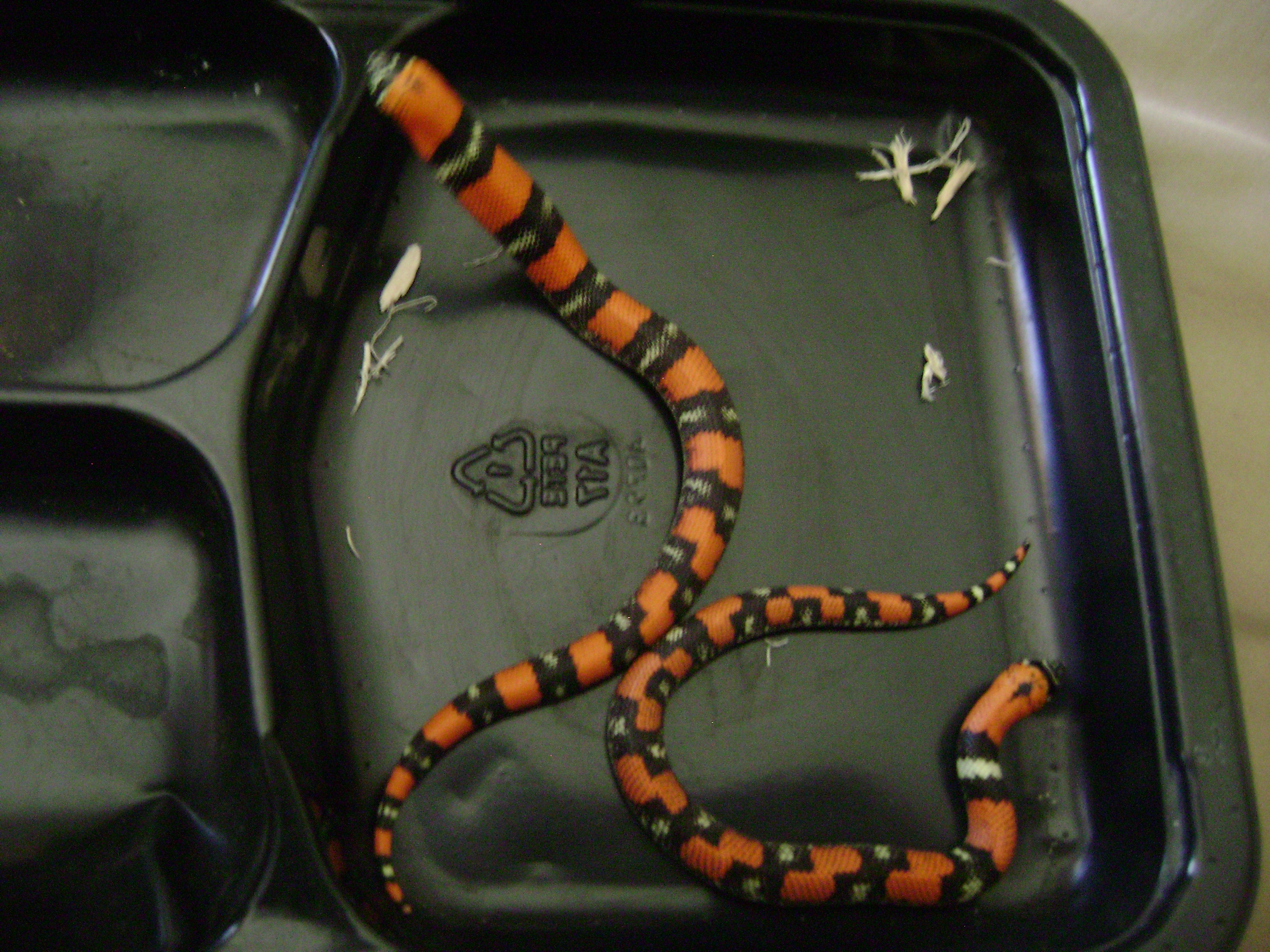
- Hatchling tricolor hognose snakes

Conservation status
- Least Concern (IUCN 3.1)

Scientific classification
- Kingdom: Animalia
- Phylum: Chordata
- Class: Reptilia
- Order: Squamata
- Suborder: Serpentes
- Family: Colubridae
- Genus: Xenodon
- Species: X. pulcher

Binomial name
- Xenodon pulcher (Jan, 1863)

Synonyms
- Heterodon pulcher Jan, 1863; Lystrophis pulcher (Jan, 1863)

= Xenodon pulcher =

Species of snake

Xenodon pulcher is a species of fossorial, mildly venomous snake in the subfamily Dipsadinae of the family Colubridae. The species is native to southern South America.

== Taxonomy ==
Xenodon pulcher was originally described as Heterodon pulcher and later assigned to the genus Lystrophis, a genus of South American hognose snakes, which while similar in appearance to North American (Heterodon) and Madagascan (Leioheterodon) hognoses, are not closely related.

== Common names ==
Common names for Xenodon pulcher include tricolor hognose snake, banded hognose snake, false coral snake, and culebra falsa in South American Spanish. It is sometimes incorrectly called ringed hognose snake, the common name for Xenodon semicinctus. Both X. pulcher and X. semicinctus are similar in appearance, which may be the cause of naming confusion.

== Description ==
This tricolor hognose snake is distinguishable by its namesake upturned rostral scale and striking banded pattern of white stripes bordered with black on a red base. It uses mimicry for defense, as it displays the same colors and patterns as some venomous coral snakes. When threatened, it may use a defensive display involving bluff strikes, neck flattening, and spastic movements similar to coral snakes. While Xenodon pulcher possesses a relatively stocky body shape similar to snakes of the genus Heterodon, X. pulcher is usually somewhat smaller and slimmer. Females grow to a total length (tail included) of 24 in (61 cm), while males stay smaller at 18–20 in (46–51 cm). Both sexes have a lifespan of 7–8 years, considerably shorter than most hognose snakes.

== Venom ==
Xenodon pulcher is rear-fanged (opisthoglyphous) and venomous like members of the genus Heterodon. While the latter have extremely mild venom that only causes minor pain and swelling in humans, some anecdotal evidence shows X. pulcher venom may be slightly more toxic.

== Geographic distribution and habitat ==
Xenodon pulcher is primarily found in the Chaco bioregion, extending through Bolivia, Paraguay, and northern Argentina. Its range may extend into Chile and parts of southwestern Brazil. This region is a dry, sandy environment on the eastern foothills of the Andes, characterized by dry scrubland, grasslands, and savannas. It is typically found near streams, as its diet consists mainly of amphibians (similar to the diet of other hognose snakes).
