= Xenodon nattereri =

Conservation status
- Least Concern (IUCN 3.1)

Scientific classification
- Kingdom: Animalia
- Phylum: Chordata
- Class: Reptilia
- Order: Squamata
- Suborder: Serpentes
- Family: Colubridae
- Genus: Xenodon
- Species: X. nattereri

Binomial name
- Xenodon nattereri (Steindachner, 1867)

Synonyms
- Heterodon nattereri Steindachner, 1867; Lystrophis nattereri (Steindachner, 1867)

Species of snake

Xenodon nattereri, also known commonly as Natterer's hognose snake and achatadeira in Brazilian Portuguese, is a species of snake in the subfamily Dipsadinae of the family Colubridae. The species is native to eastern South America.

== Etymology ==
The specific name, nattereri, is in honor of Austrian naturalist Johann Natterer.

== Description ==
A small species of snake, Xenodon nattereri has an average snout-to-vent length (SVL) of only 27 cm (11 in).

== Geographic distribution ==
Xenodon nattereri is found in Argentina, Brazil, Paraguay, and Uruguay.

== Habitat ==
The preferred natural habitats of Xenodon nattereri are grassland and savanna.

== Behavior ==
Xenodon nattereri is diurnal, fossorial, and terrestrial.

== Diet ==
Xenodon nattereri preys predominantly upon lizards of the family Gymnophthalmidae and their eggs.

== Reproduction ==
Xenodon nattereri is oviparous. Clutch size is two to ten eggs.
