= Prince Maximilian of Wied-Neuwied =

German ethnologist (1782-1867)

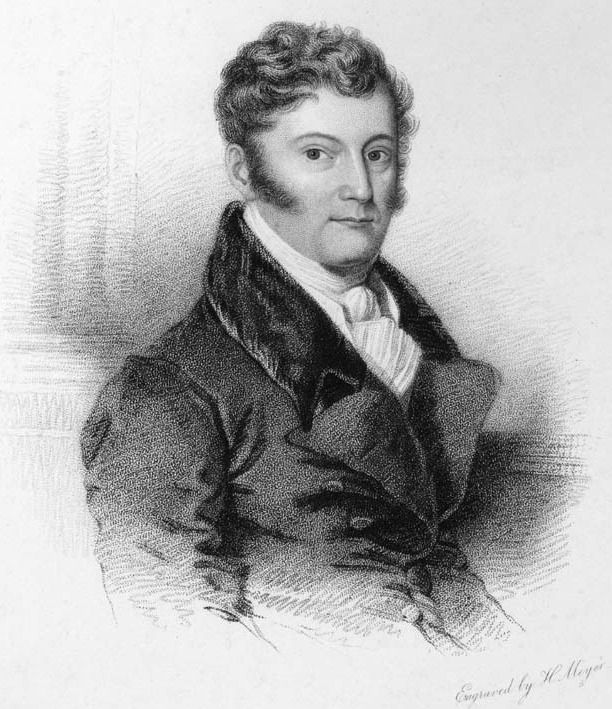
- Prince Maximilian of Wied-Neuwied
- Born: 23 September 1782; Neuwied, Holy Roman Empire
- Died: 3 February 1867 (aged 84); Neuwied, Kingdom of Prussia
- Scientific career
- Fields: Ethnology; Natural history
- Author abbrev. (botany): Wied-Neuw.

Prince Alexander Philipp Maximilian zu Wied-Neuwied (23 September 1782 – 3 February 1867) was a German explorer, ethnologist and naturalist. He led a pioneering expedition to southeast Brazil between 1815 and 1817, from which the album Reise nach Brasilien, which first revealed to Europe real images of Brazilian Indians, was the ultimate result. It was translated into several languages and recognized as one of the greatest contributions to the European knowledge of Brazil at the beginning of the nineteenth century. In 1832 he embarked on another expedition, this time to the United States, together with the Swiss painter Karl Bodmer.

Prince Maximilian collected many examples of ethnography, and many specimens of flora and fauna of the area, still preserved in museum collections, notably in the Linden Museum, Stuttgart. The genus Neuwiedia Blume (Orchidaceae) was named for him. Also, Prince Maximilian is honored in the scientific names of eight species of reptiles: Hydromedusa maximiliani, Micrablepharus maximiliani, Bothrops neuwiedi, Polemon neuwiedi, Pseudoboa neuwiedi, Dipsas neuwiedi, Xenodon neuwiedii, and Ramphotyphlops wiedii.

== Biography ==
Wied was born in Neuwied, the grandson of the ruling count (after 1784 prince) Johann Friedrich Alexander of Wied-Neuwied. Born at the end of the European Enlightenment, Maximilian became friends with two of its major figures: Johann Friedrich Blumenbach, a major comparative anthropologist under whom he studied biological sciences, and Alexander von Humboldt, who served as Maximilian's mentor. He joined the Prussian army in 1800 during the Napoleonic Wars, rising to the rank of major in the Zieten Hussars. He was given a leave of absence from the army in 1815 (prior to Napoleon's escape from Elba).

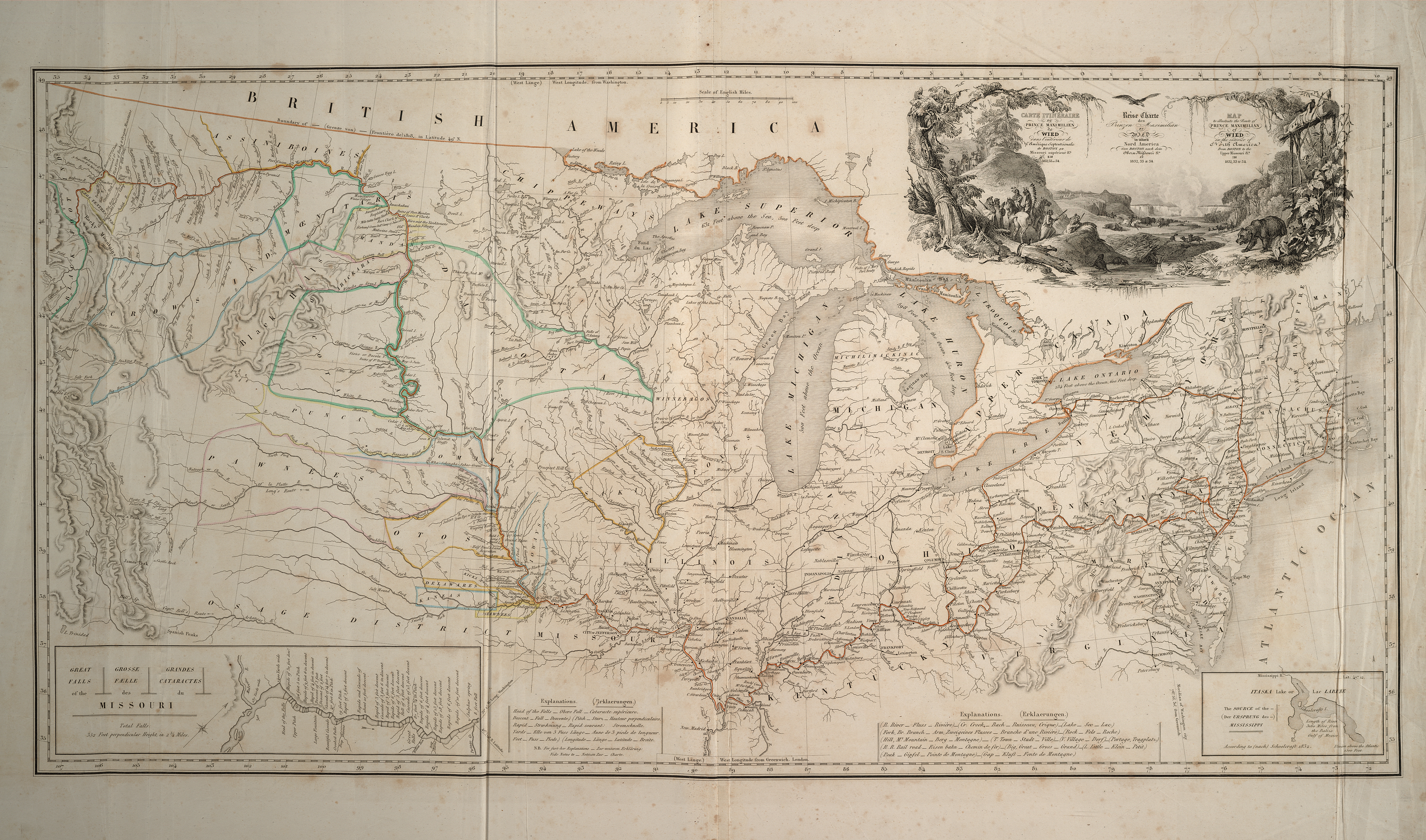
Map of his 1832-1834 North American travels.

Wied led an expedition to southeast Brazil from 1815 to 1817. In 1816 he found the tribe of the Botocudos, about which he gave exact details for the first time. On account of the war among the different tribes of the country he was obliged to abandon his original route and remained for some time near some ruins that he had come across. North of the Belmonte river he made his way through the woods, and after many difficulties arrived in the province of Minas Gerais. His delicate health forced him to abandon his expedition, and he was detained on unfounded suspicions for four days, and robbed of a large part of his collection of insects and plants. After this he resolved to leave the country, and embarked for Germany on 10 May 1817. On his return, he wrote Reise nach Brasilien (1820–21) and Beiträge zur Naturgeschichte von Brasilien (1825–33).

In 1832 he travelled to the Great Plains region of the United States, accompanied by the Swiss painter Karl Bodmer on a journey up the Missouri River, and wrote Reise in das Innere Nord-Amerikas (1840) on his return. During his travels, he was a sympathetic recorder of the cultures of many of the Native American tribes he encountered, notably the Mandan and the Hidatsa, who lived in settled villages on the banks of the Missouri, but also such nomadic peoples as the Sioux, Assiniboine, Plains Cree, Gros Ventres and Blackfoot. Bodmer's watercolour paintings of individuals, artefacts and customs among the Indians are acknowledged as among the most accurate and informative ever made. Many were adapted as hand-coloured engravings to illustrate the publication of 1840.

In 1845, he was elected as a member of the American Philosophical Society.

== Gallery ==
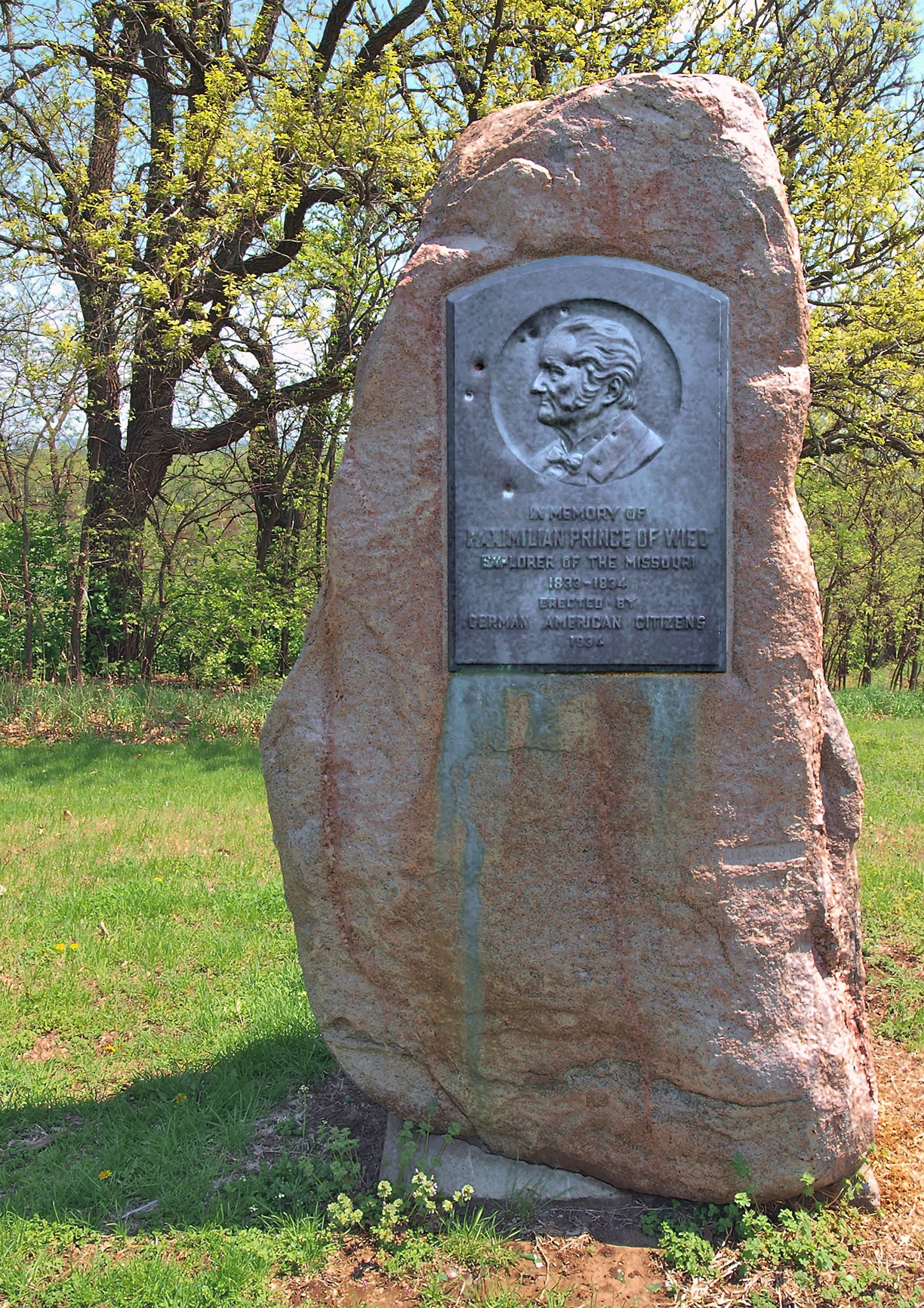
Memorial to Prince Maximilian of Wied-Neuwied in Mount Vernon Gardens, Omaha, Nebraska, United States.

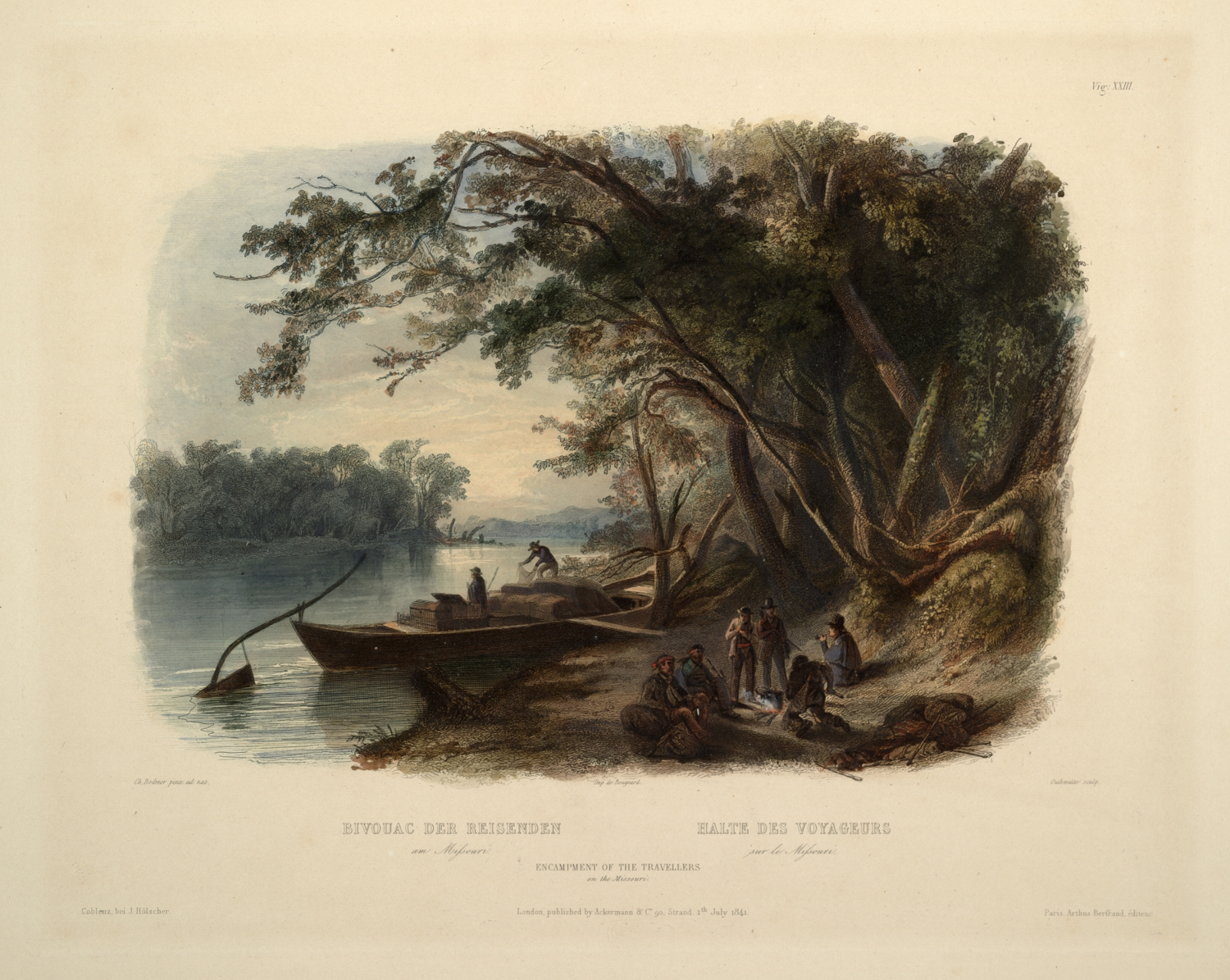
Encampment of the travellers on the Missouri. Maximilian is likely the man on the right in blue smoking a pipe. Aquatint illustration by Karl Bodmer from Maximilian Prince of Wied’s Travels in the Interior of North America, during the years 1832–1834.

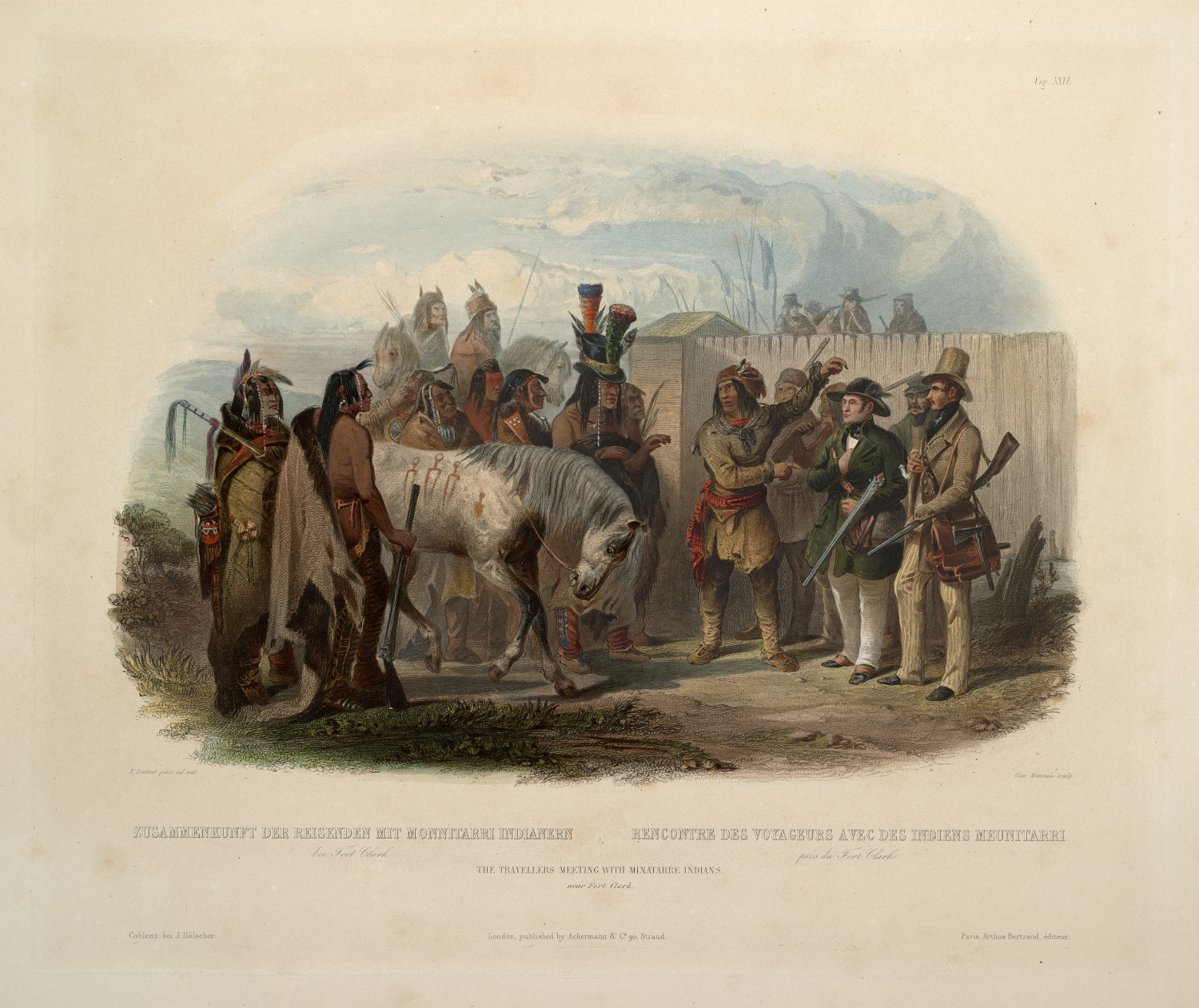
The Travellers Meeting with Minatarre Indians Near Fort Clark. Maximilian is apparently the man in green holding a gun. Aquatint illustration by Karl Bodmer from Maximilian Prince of Wied’s Travels in the Interior of North America, during the years 1832–1834.

== See also ==
- Category:Taxa named by Prince Maximilian of Wied-Neuwied
- Leopardus wiedii, a spotted cat named for Maximilian zu Wied-Neuwied
- Helianthus maximiliani, the Maximilian sunflower
