= Santa Catarina (state) =

State of Brazil

- State
- Flag Coat of arms
- Anthem: Hino do Estado de Santa Catarina
- Location in Brazil
- Coordinates: 27°15′S 50°20′W
- Country: Brazil
- Region: South
- Capital: Florianópolis
- Largest city: Joinville

Government
  - Type: Unitary state
  - Governor: Jorginho Mello (PL)
  - Vice Governor: Marilisa Boehm (PL)
  - Senators: Esperidião Amin (PP); Ivete da Silveira (MDB); Jorge Seif (PL)
  - Legislature: Legislative Assembly of Santa Catarina

Area
  - Total: 95,730.684 km^{2} (36,961.824 sq mi)
  - Rank: 20th

Population (2025)
  - Total: 8,187,029
  - Rank: 10th
  - Density: 85.52147/km^{2} (221.4996/sq mi)
  - Rank: 9th
- Demonym(s): Catarinense; Barriga-Verde (Green-Belly)

GDP (2024)
  - Total: R$584.224 billion (US$108.412 billion)

HDI (2024)
  - Category: 0.833 (3rd) – very high
- Time zone: UTC-3 (BRT)
- Postal Code: 87000-000 to 89990-000
- ISO 3166 code: BR-SC
- Website: www.sc.gov.br

Santa Catarina (English: /ˈsæntə ˌkætəˈriːnə/ SAN-tə KAT-ə-REE-nə, Brazilian Portuguese: [ˈsɐ̃tɐ kataˈɾinɐ]) is one of the 27 federative units of Brazil. It is located in the centre of the country's Southern region. It is bordered to the north by the state of Paraná, to the south by the state of Rio Grande do Sul, to the east by the Atlantic Ocean, and to the west by the Argentine province of Misiones.

The state covers an area of approximately 95,730.69 square kilometres (37,000 sq mi), comparable to Hungary, and ranking as the seventh smallest Brazilian state by area. With a population of 7.6 million inhabitants in 2022, it is the tenth most populous state in Brazil. It is divided into 295 municipalities and its capital is Florianópolis, the second most populous city in the state after Joinville. Alongside Espírito Santo, Santa Catarina is one of the two states whose capital is not the largest city. Jorginho Mello, a member of the conservative Liberal Party, has been the governor of the state since 2023.

It is one of the Brazilian states with the most mountainous terrain, where 52% of the territory is located above 600 metres. According to the Köppen-Geiger climate classification system, Santa Catarina predominantly features a humid subtropical climate (Cfa) in the coastal lowlands and the lower altitude areas of the plateau, whilst the remainder of the plateau is characterised by an oceanic climate (Cfb).

The state of Santa Catarina is one of the oldest states in Brazil. It separated from São Paulo in 1738, with José da Silva Pais serving as its first governor. The state was established to extend Portuguese dominions to southern Brazil, reaching as far as the Rio de la Plata region. It is also the oldest state in the South Region of Brazil, predating Rio Grande do Sul (1807) and Paraná (1853). The state was populated by various peoples throughout its history, such as the indigenous Carijós people of the Tupi-Guarani group, and later became an important destination for Azorean Portuguese, Italian, German, and other European immigrants. African slaves and their descendants also contributed to the formation of the state's population.

The socioeconomic indicators of Santa Catarina rank among the best in Brazil. The state leads in life expectancy and public safety, and boasts the lowest rates of homicide, illiteracy, poverty and extreme poverty in the country. It holds also the third-highest Human Development Index (HDI), the third-highest GDP per capita, and the third-lowest rates of infant mortality. Additionally, it is the federative unit with the least economic inequality in Brazil.

== Etymology ==
Francisco Dias Velho, who arrived on the island now known as Santa Catarina around 1675, is said to have given the place its name. There, he built a chapel dedicated to Catherine of Alexandria, whom, it is claimed, one of his daughters was named after. Other authors attribute the origin of the name to Sebastian Cabot, a Venetian explorer and cartographer, who is said to have dedicated the island. At that time, Sebastian Cabot passed through the area between 1526 and 1527. He is thought to have consecrated it to Saint Catherine, or rather, honoured his wife, Catarina Medrano. The name of the state is derived from that of the island.

The state's native inhabitants are called Catarinenses or Barrigas-Verdes (lit. Green-Belly). The origin of the term comes from the waistcoat worn by the soldiers of the Portuguese military forces, under José da Silva Pais. These troops, in 1753, departed from Santa Catarina to fight in Rio Grande do Sul and secured for Brazil the conquest of the Captaincy of Santa Catarina.

Originating from Catholicism, the name honours the state's patron saint. The Romans worshipped an ancient deity, Sancus, who ensured promises and oaths were not violated, mandating their fulfilment. From his name comes the Latin verb sancire, "to consecrate". Sanctus, "holy, consecrated, which must, above all, be treated with respect", is the past participle of the verb itself. Etymologically, the name Catherine derives from the Greek term εκατερινα, meaning "pure" or "immaculate".

== History ==
=== Indigenous peoples, colonial and imperial era ===
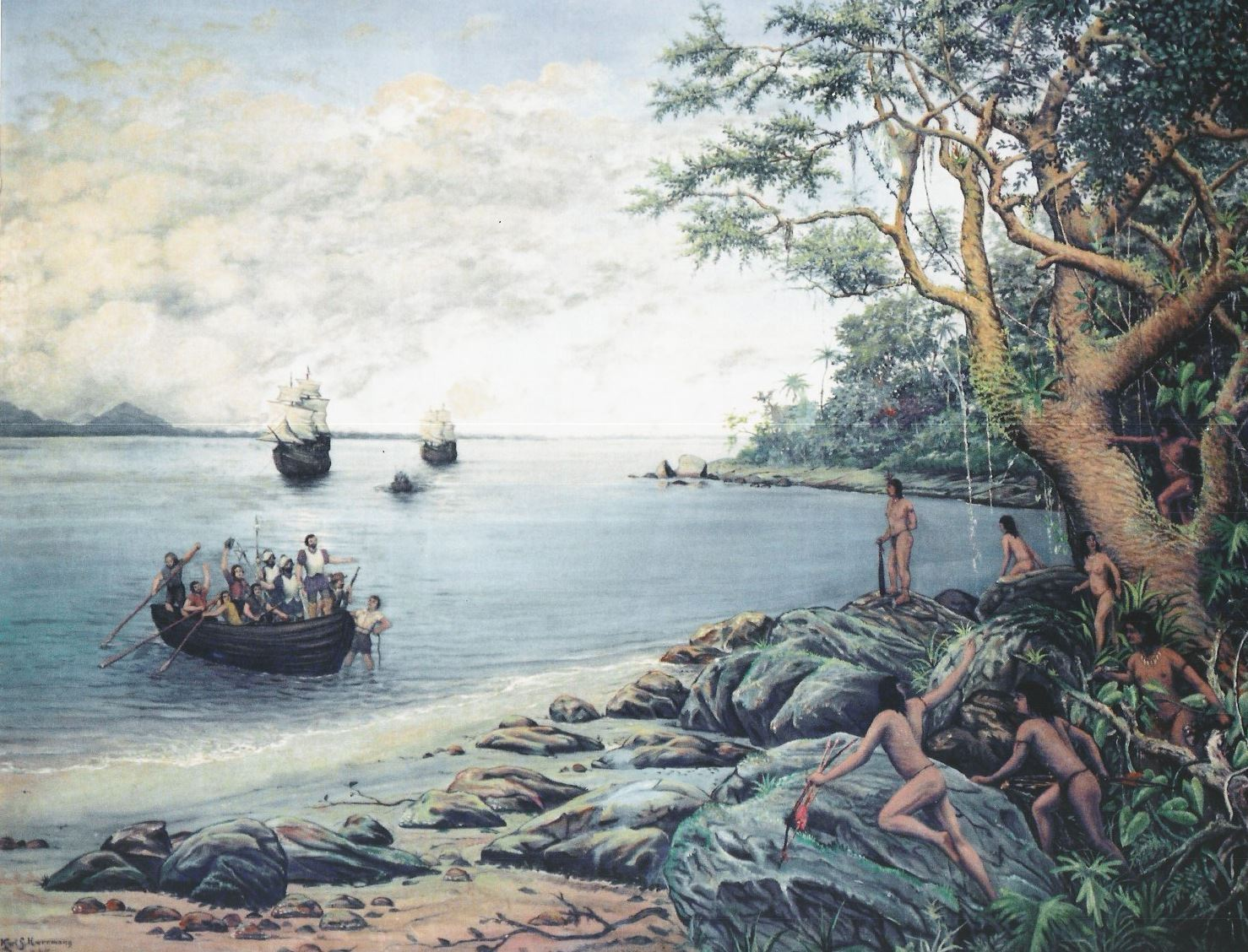
Arrival of the French, led by Gonneville, to the land that would later become São Francisco do Sul

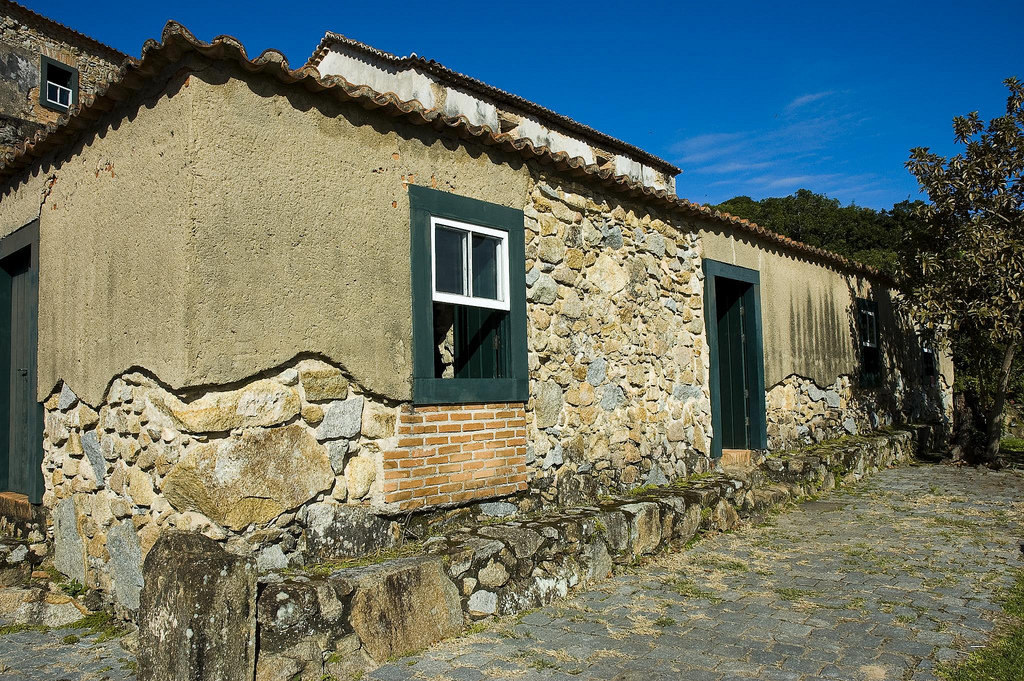
Colonial settlement on the Island of Santa Catarina

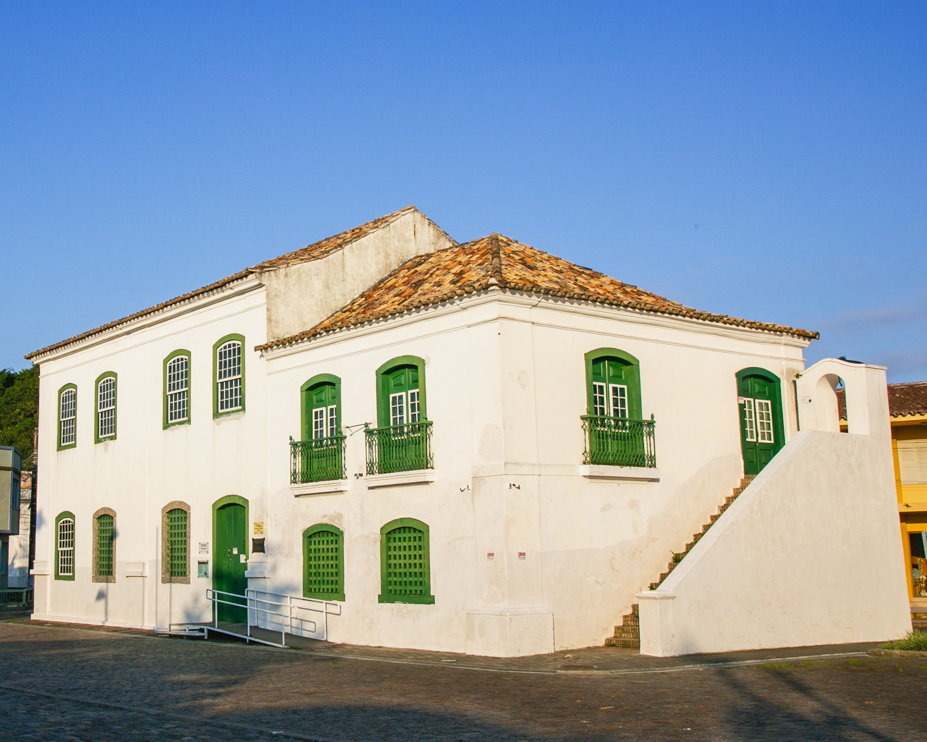
Anita Garibaldi Museum, in Laguna, where the independence of the Juliana Republic was proclaimed

At the outset of the 16th century, the area now known as the state of Santa Catarina was populated by the Carijós, a tribe belonging to the Tupi-Guarani group. These Indigenous peoples were catechised (educated and pacified in the Catholic faith) starting from 1549.

Expeditions from Portugal and Spain commenced exploration of the Santa Catarina coast in the early years following Brazil's discovery by Europeans. Sebastian Cabot, en route to the Rio de la Plata, navigated past the island then known as Dos Patos, bestowing upon it the name Santa Catarina in 1526. In 1534, John III of Portugal awarded the mainland territories to Pedro Lopes de Sousa. Nevertheless, these lands remained largely uninhabited, with Jesuits, Spanish, and Portuguese settlers exploring them but failing to establish any permanent settlements throughout the 16th century.

From the outset of Brazil's colonisation, the lands of Brazil's southern region did not greatly interest the Portuguese colonisers. This was due to the absence of precious metals and its colder climate (as frosts hindered the cultivation of sugarcane). The Portuguese only began to take an interest in the region in the mid-17th century. The settlement of Nossa Senhora da Graça do Rio de São Francisco was established by Manuel Lourenço de Andrade and his friends in 1658. The present-day city was the first permanent settlement in the region.

The settlement of Nossa Senhora do Desterro, on the island of Santa Catarina, was established by the Paulista bandeirante Francisco Dias Velho in 1675. At that time, the notable settler was accompanied by his heirs, slaves, and servants. In 1676, the settlement of Laguna was initiated by Domingos de Brito Peixoto. The Captaincy of Santa Catarina, initially linked to São Paulo, was founded in 1738. It was separated from São Paulo and incorporated into Rio de Janeiro's in 1739.

From the 1740s onwards, initiated by Alexandre de Gusmão, minister of King John V, Portugal began a colonisation and settlement project in southern Brazil, aiming to secure possession of the territory disputed by the Spanish. With this objective, immigration from Madeira Island and the Azores was sought. An insular defensive system was implemented. From 1748 to 1756, around five thousand Azorean immigrants began to populate the island and the coastline of the captaincy. Disputes between Portugal and Spain led to the occupation and destruction of the island of Santa Catarina by Spanish troops in 1777. The First Treaty of San Ildefonso forced the Spanish to surrender the invaded region.

The Captaincy of Our Lady of the Rosary of Paranaguá was founded by the Marquis of Cascais in 1656. It replaced the Captaincy of Santana, which began at the mouth of the Paranaguá Bay and ended in the current city of Laguna. It is bounded by the Captaincy of Santo Amaro (part of the second section of São Vicente) to the north, the salty waters of the Atlantic Ocean to the east, and the Governorate of New Andalusia to the west. These extinct states were delimited by the Treaty of Tordesillas.

The captaincy was elevated to the status of a province with the declaration of independence of Brazil. The province of Santa Catarina suffered profound consequences from the Ragamuffin War, which took place in Rio Grande do Sul in 1835. The revolutionaries, led by Giuseppe Garibaldi and David Canabarro, invaded Laguna and declared the Juliana Republic in July 1839. Defeated by the troops of the Empire of Brazil, the rebels left Laguna. The new South American country had a short duration because, when its independence was proclaimed, it stopped paying the Riograndense Republic due to lack of resources. The last Ragamuffin trenches were demolished in 1840. European colonisation, especially from Germany and Italy, was boosted in the second half of the 19th century. The colonies of Dona Francisca, later Joinville, were established in 1850; Blumenau in 1852; and Brusque in 1860.

=== Republican period ===
Map of the State of Santa Catarina, 1907. National Brazilian National Archives

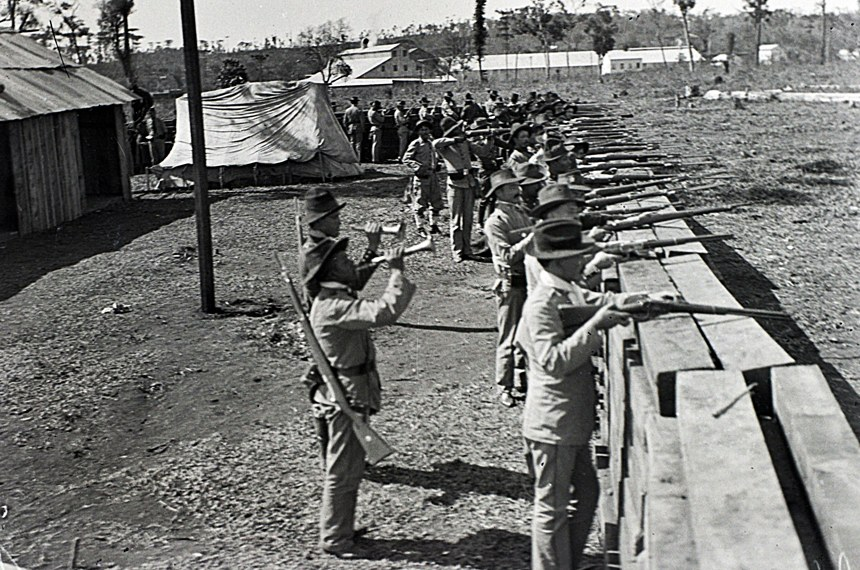
Contestado War: Army troops guarding a sawmill during a rebel attack in Três Barras.

The province adhered to the proclamation of the Republic. However, the appointed governor rebelled against the federal government of the time, supporting the Federalist Revolution in 1893. Desterro became the naval base of the revolutionary squadron led by Custódio José de Melo.

The armed conflicts spread throughout the coast of Santa Catarina. Defeated in 1894, the revolutionaries were severely punished by the loyalist troops. Hercílio Luz was elected governor in 1894 and developed a policy for the pacification of the region and the repair of the infrastructural problems that the state had suffered. Desterro was renamed Florianópolis, in honour of Floriano Peixoto, following a turn of events that cost the lives of the defenders of the revolution.

The Contestado War began in 1912. This conflict pitted the needy inhabitants of the region located between the Negro, Iguazu, Canoas, and Uruguay rivers against the official forces. José Maria de Santo Agostinho, a healer considered sacred, led the backlanders. Moreover, Paraná and Santa Catarina were disputing the region where they lived, which is why the area was called Contestado. The disagreement between the two federative units and the armed conflict of the caboclos only ended completely in 1916. Santa Catarina's territory was invaded by the rebellious forces, which came from Rio Grande do Sul, in 1930. However, Florianópolis resisted until the triumph of the revolution throughout the country.

During the Second World War, it was necessary to address the issue of Nazi infiltration in the state. In this area, the Brazilian military effort was not compromised by groups of Germans, following a futile attempt. Up until 1945, intervenors governed the state throughout President Getúlio Vargas's administration. Since the 1950s, encouragement for the colonisation of the far west and the centre of the state by Italian-Brazilian settlers has contributed to the progress of Santa Catarina. These settlers came from Rio Grande do Sul.

== Geography ==
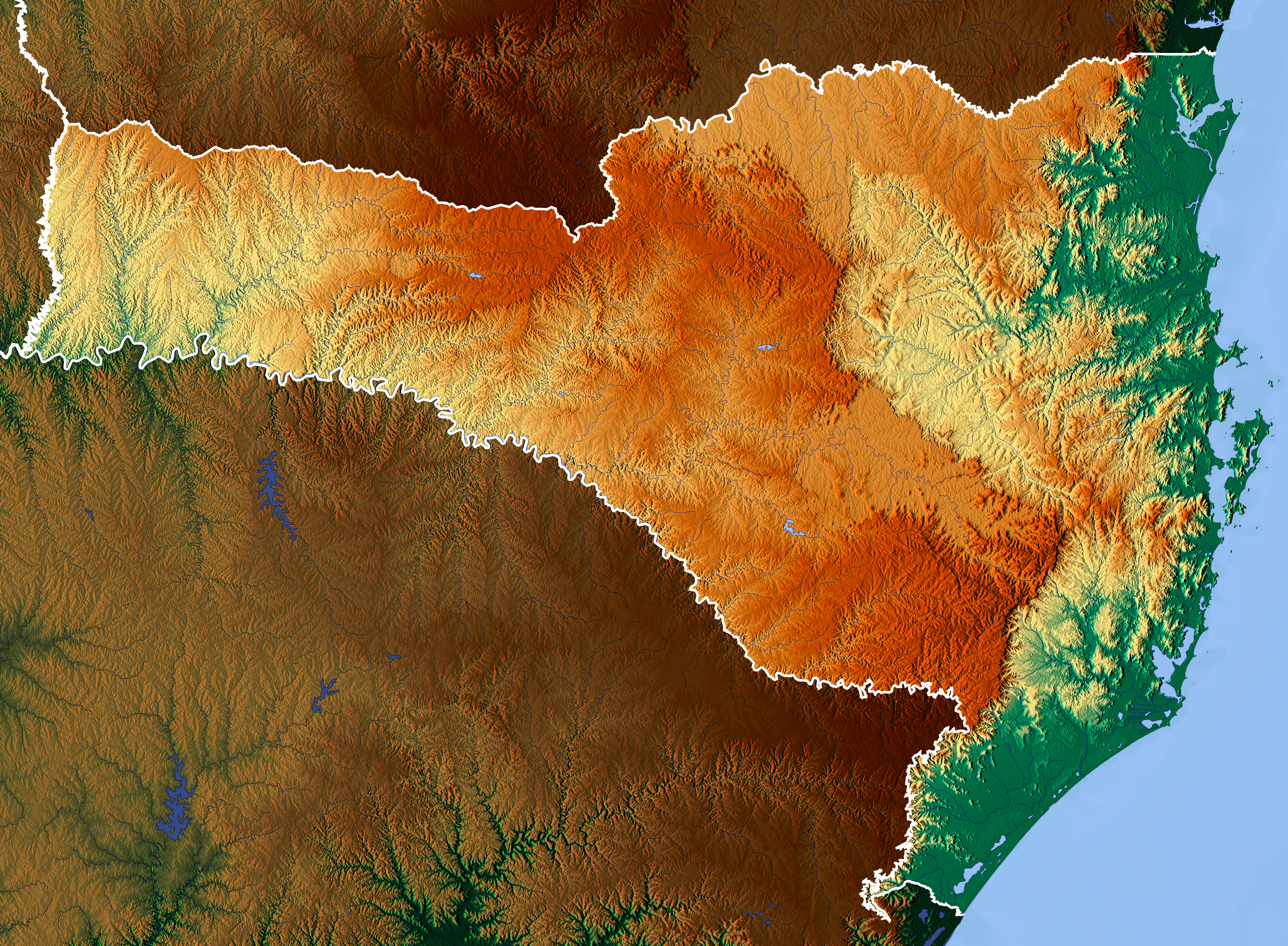
Topographic map of Santa Catarina

Santa Catarina is one of the three states in the Southern Region of Brazil. It is bordered to the north by the state of Paraná, to the south by the state of Rio Grande do Sul, to the east by the Atlantic Ocean, and to the west by the Argentine province of Misiones. The state covers an area of approximately 95,730.69 square kilometres (37,000 sq mi), comparable to Hungary, and ranking as the seventh smallest Brazilian state by area.

Its territory is entirely below the Tropic of Capricorn, in the southern temperate zone of the planet. It follows the UTC−03:00 time zone (Brasília time), three hours behind Greenwich Mean Time. Its extreme points are: to the north, the Saí-Guaçu river in the municipality of Itapoá; to the south, the Mampituba river in Praia Grande; to the east, the Ponta dos Ingleses in Florianópolis; to the west, the confluence of the Uruguay and Pepiri-Guazu rivers in Itapiranga, on the border with Argentina.

=== Relief ===
Santa Catarina has 77% of its territory above 300 metres and 52% above 600 metres, making it one of the Brazilian federative units with the highest relief. Four geomorphological units, ranging from the coast to the interior, form the state's relief: the coastal lowland, the Serra do Mar, the Palaeozoic plateau, and the Basaltic plateau. The lowest altitudes are found in the coastal lowland, which encompasses lands located below 200 metres. In the northern part, it is quite wide, extending far inland through the valleys of the rivers that flow from the Serra do Mar. Meanwhile, towards the south, it gradually narrows.

The Serra do Mar occupies the coastal lowland in the western part. In the north of the state, it forms the mountainous edge of a reasonably average plateau. It has a very different feature from what is found in other states such as Paraná and São Paulo. In Santa Catarina, it constitutes a range of mountains, with points above one thousand metres. This range is formed by a group of massifs isolated by the deep valleys of the rivers that descend to the Atlantic Ocean. Behind the Serra do Mar, the Palaeozoic plateau extends. Its flattened area is divided into spaces separated by rivers, which flow eastward. The Palaeozoic plateau decreases in altitude from north to south. In the southern portion of the state, it merges with the coastal plain, since the Serra do Mar does not extend to this region of Santa Catarina.

The Basaltic plateau encompasses a significant portion of the state's territory. Comprising basaltic sediments (lava flows), interspersed with sandstone deposits, its eastern boundary is a mountainous edge known as the Serra Geral. In the north of the state, the edge of the basaltic plateau is situated inland. Moving southwards, it progressively approaches the coast until, at the border with Rio Grande do Sul, it starts to descend directly towards the sea. The plateau area is reasonably average and slopes gently westward. The rivers, flowing towards the neighbouring state of Paraná, have carved deep valleys into it. The lands of the mixed ombrophilous forest are infertile, as are the soils of the grasslands, which are utilised for dairy and beef cattle farming. The soils of the humid subtropical forest are characterised by their fertility.

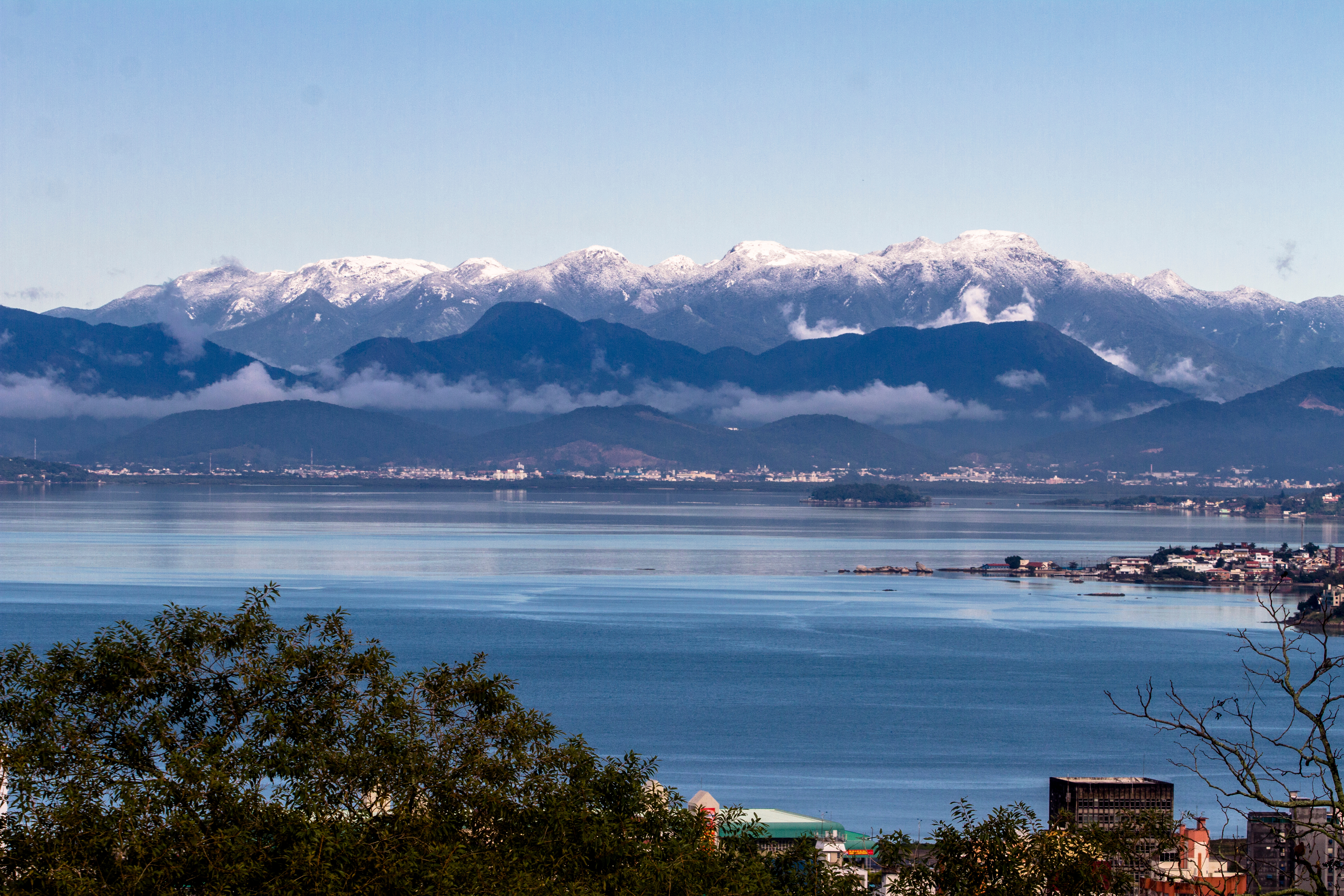
Serra do Tabuleiro State Park during winter

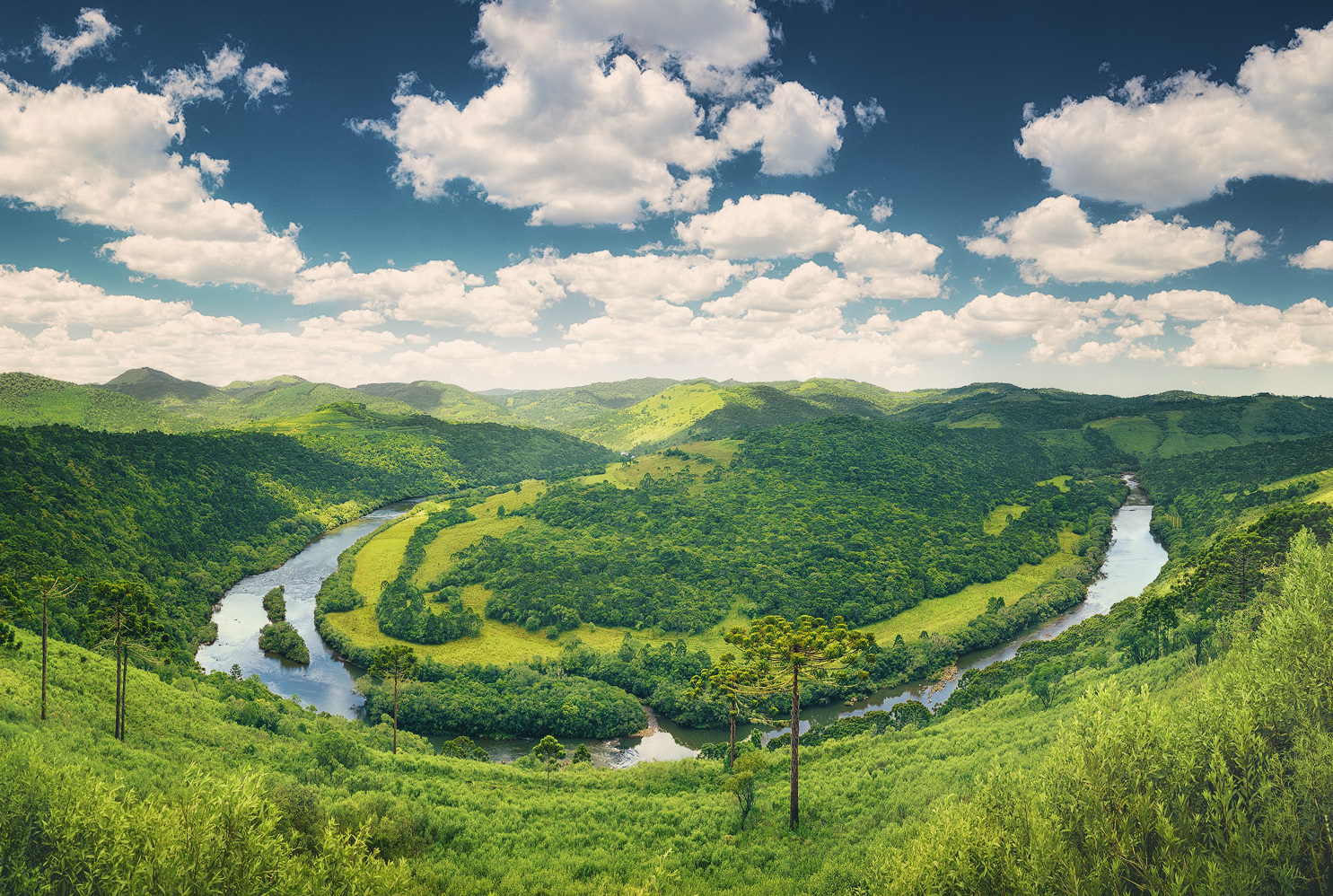
Pelotas River in the border between Santa Catarina and Rio Grande do Sul

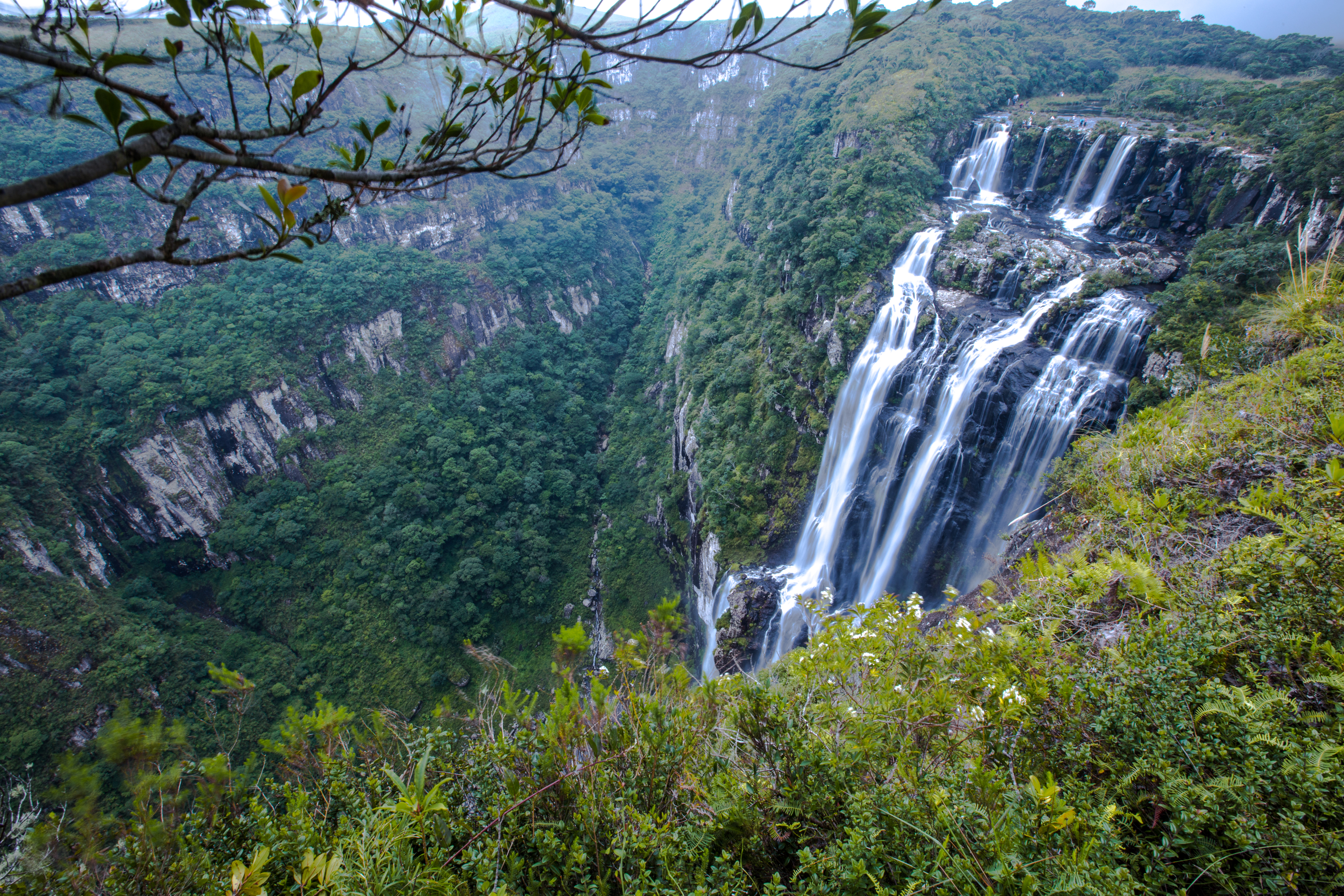
Tigre Preto falls in the Serra Geral National Park

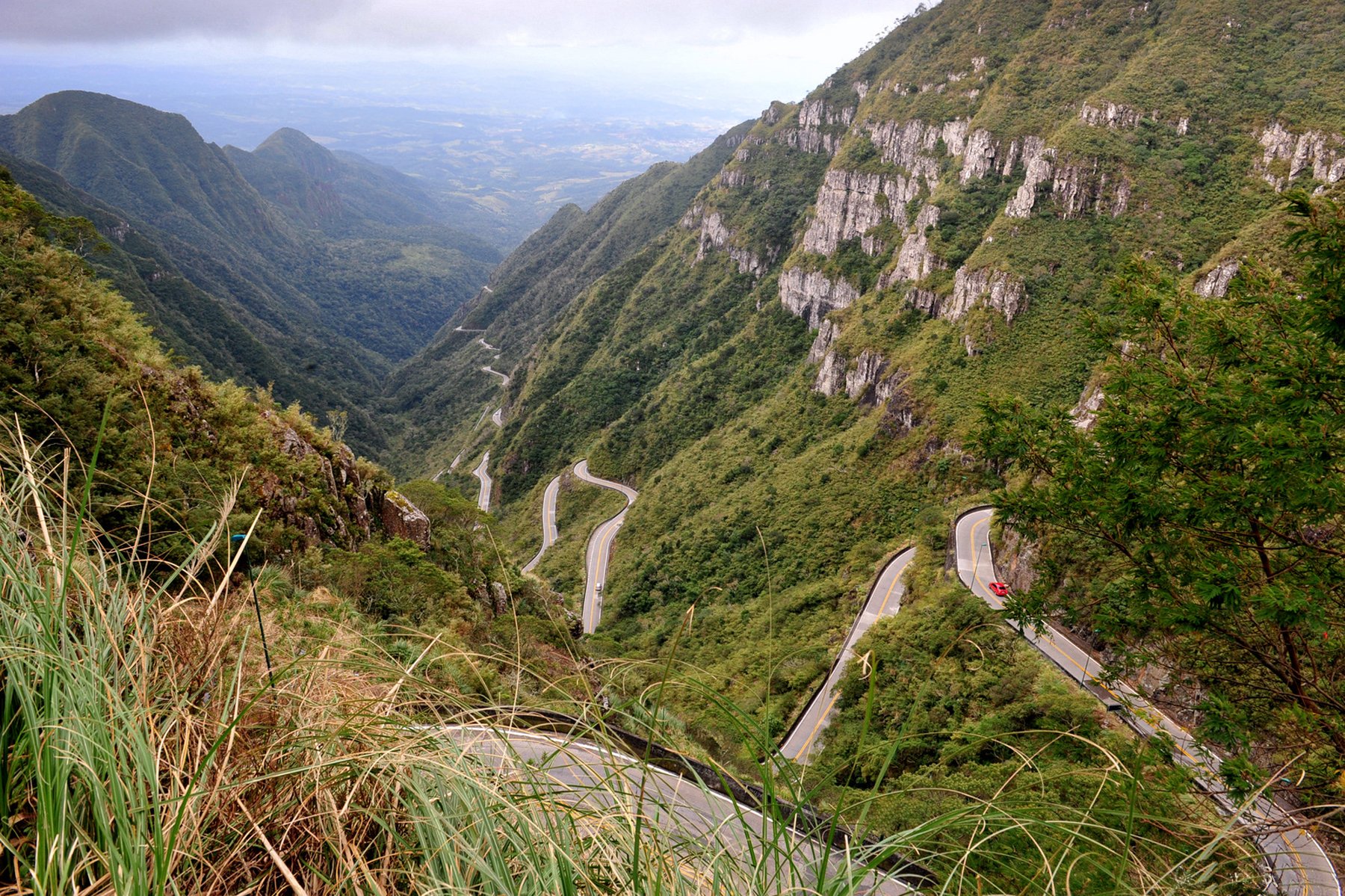
Serra do Rio do Rastro with the state highway SC-390

=== Climate ===
Köppen types of Santa Catarina

According to the Köppen-Geiger climate classification system, Santa Catarina predominantly features a humid subtropical climate (Cfa) in the coastal lowlands and the lower altitude areas of the plateau, whilst the remainder of the plateau is characterised by a subtropical oceanic climate (Cfb). Both have the four seasons well-defined and a rainfall regime evenly distributed throughout the year.

The humid subtropical climate (Cfa) records average temperatures of 20 °C in the lowlands and the Uruguay Valley, and 18 °C in the western extremity of the state. Conversely, the temperate subtropical climate (Cfb) sees average temperatures ranging between 16 and 18 °C. There is a significant difference between summer and winter temperatures, leading to a considerable thermal amplitude throughout the year. Winters vary from cool to cold, with some regions experiencing about 25 days of frost annually. During this period, the incursion of polar air masses is more common, some being stronger and more extensive, causing temperatures to fall below zero in various cities. The majority of these cities are located in the Midwest, North Plateau, and South Plateau. Notably, Bom Jardim da Serra, São Joaquim, Urubici, and Urupema, situated on the South Plateau, rank among the coldest municipalities in the country.

A large part of Rio Grande do Sul is situated at latitudes lower than Santa Catarina. Despite this, it is in the higher areas of the Santa Catarina southern plateau where there is a higher occurrence of snowfall in Brazil during the winter months. The state also holds the record for the lowest temperature recorded in Brazilian territory by official bodies. The temperature reached −14 °C in Caçador on 11 June 1952. On the other hand, the highest temperature reached 44.6 °C in Orleans on 6 January 1963. The hottest localities in the state are located in the regions of the southern coast, Itajaí Valley, and extreme west. This is because here lies the city considered the hottest in Santa Catarina, Itapiranga. In these regions, temperatures can exceed 40 °C in the summer or on other extreme occasions.

=== Hydrography ===
The rivers that flow through the state's territory are part of both autonomous systems delineated by the Serra Geral and Serra do Mar mountain ranges. The South Atlantic basin is made up of inter-delimited basins, such as those of the Itajaí-Açu, Tubarão, Araranguá, Tijucas, and Itapocu rivers. In the interior of the state, two basins come together to form the Plata basin: that of the Paraná, whose most important tributary is the Iguazu River, and that of the Uruguay River. The latter has as its main tributaries the Pelotas, Canoas, Chapecó, and Do Peixe rivers.

=== Fauna and flora ===
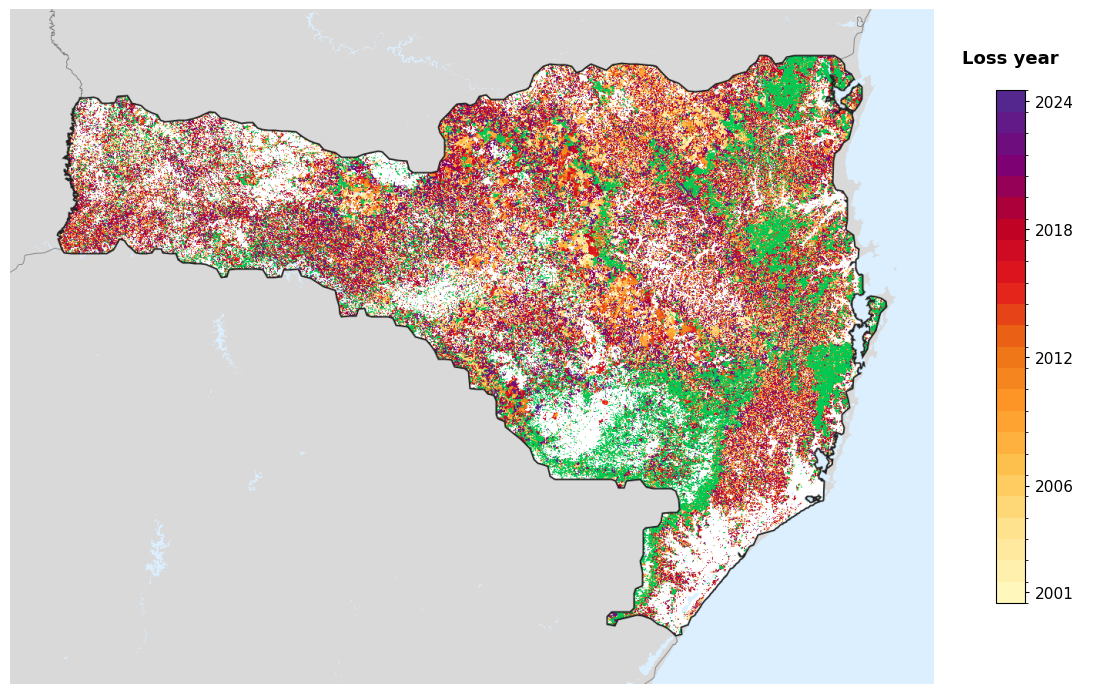
Tree-cover loss year in Santa Catarina, 2001-2024, from the Global Forest Change dataset.

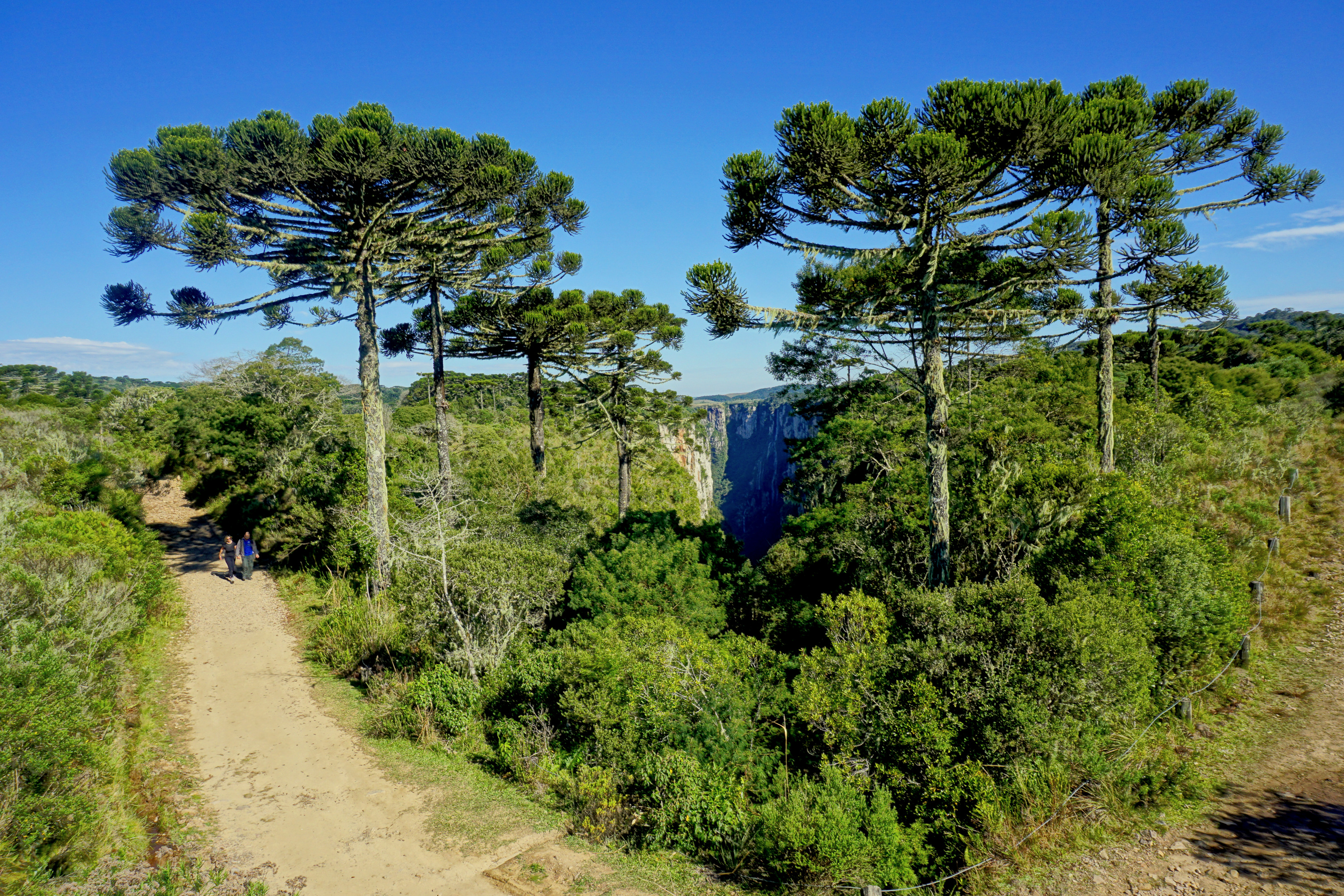
Araucaria forest

Fully embedded within the Atlantic Forest biome, the original vegetation of Santa Catarina encompasses two formations: forests and grasslands.

On the plateau, they occur in the form of mixed coniferous (Araucaria) forests with broadleaved trees and, in the lowland and foothills of the Serra do Mar, solely as broadleaved forest. The grasslands appear as scattered patches within the mixed forest. The main ones are those of São Joaquim, Lages, Curitibanos, and Campos Novos.

In the fauna of Santa Catarina, about 600 species of birds, 150 mammals, and 140 systematic denominations of amphibians are catalogued. There are 1,150 Lepidoptera (butterflies and moths), in addition to the registration of about 2,300 vascular plants.

== Flag ==
The flag of Santa Catarina is a rectangle divided into three horizontal bands: the upper and lower, sips, and the central, argent. In the middle you can see a sinople rhombus with the coat of arms in the center. On August 15, 1895, Santa Catarina received a flag, designed by José Artur Boiteux. It had thirteen horizontal stripes of sips and argent in a quantity similar to that of districts in the state. Inside the sinople rhombus, jalde stars symbolized the municipalities.

== Demography ==
Historical population
Year	Pop.	±%
1872	159,802	—
1890	283,769	+77.6%
1900	320,289	+12.9%
1920	668,743	+108.8%
1940	1,178,340	+76.2%
1950	1,560,502	+32.4%
1960	2,146,909	+37.6%
1970	2,930,411	+36.5%
1980	3,687,652	+25.8%
1991	4,538,248	+23.1%
2000	5,357,864	+18.1%
2010	6,248,436	+16.6%
2022	7,610,361	+21.8%

Map of the population density in Santa Catarina per municipality in 2010

According to the 2022 Brazilian census conducted by the Brazilian Institute of Geography and Statistics (IBGE), Santa Catarina has a total population of 7.6 million and a population density of 79.5 inhabitants per square kilometre. This ranks it as the tenth most populous state in Brazil, accounting for 3.75% of the country's total population. The state's largest city, Joinville, has a population of 616,317, making it the 34th most populous city in Brazil. Meanwhile, its capital, Florianópolis, which is the state's second-largest city, has a population of 537,211, ranking it 39th among Brazilian municipalities by population.

The population grew by approximately 1.3 million inhabitants since 2010, representing an increase of 21.79% between 2010 and 2022. In 2022, around 50.71% of the population (3,859,258 people) were female, whilst about 49.28% of the population (3,751,103 people) were male.

The Human Development Index of Santa Catarina is considered high according to the UNDP. According to the latest Atlas of Human Development in Brazil, released in 2023 with data pertaining to 2021, the state has the 3rd highest HDI among the federal units in Brazil, with an overall index of 0.792. Breaking down the index into indicators of income, education, and life expectancy, the state ranks 4th in income (with an index of 0.759), 3rd in education (with an index of 0.790), and 3rd in life expectancy (with an index of 0.827). The socioeconomic indicators of Santa Catarina rank among the best in Brazil. The state leads in public safety, and boasts the lowest rates of homicide, poverty and extreme poverty in the country. It holds also the third-highest GDP per capita, and the third-lowest rates of infant mortality and illiteracy. Additionally, it is the federative unit with the least economic inequality in Brazil.

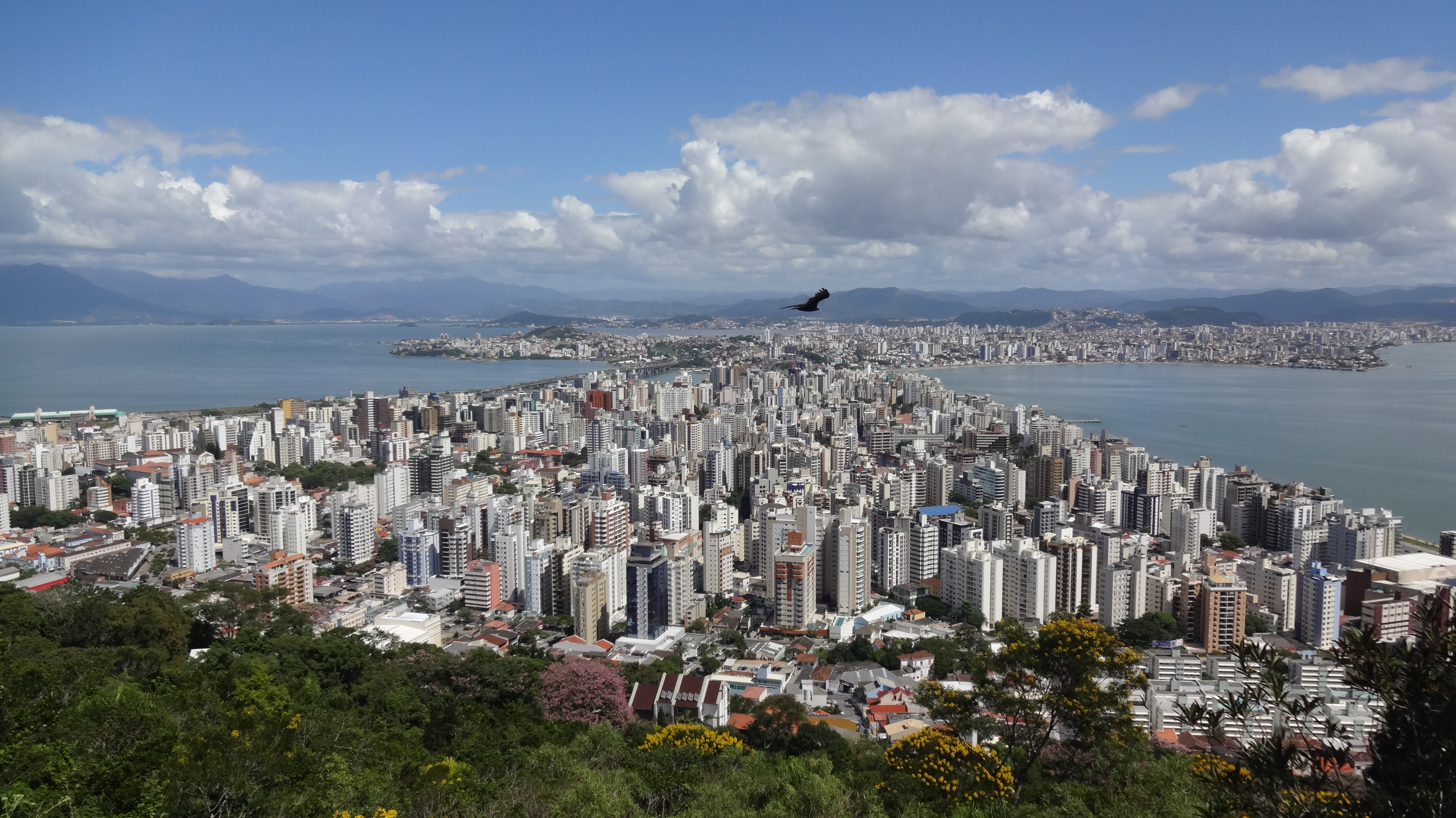
Overview of Florianópolis

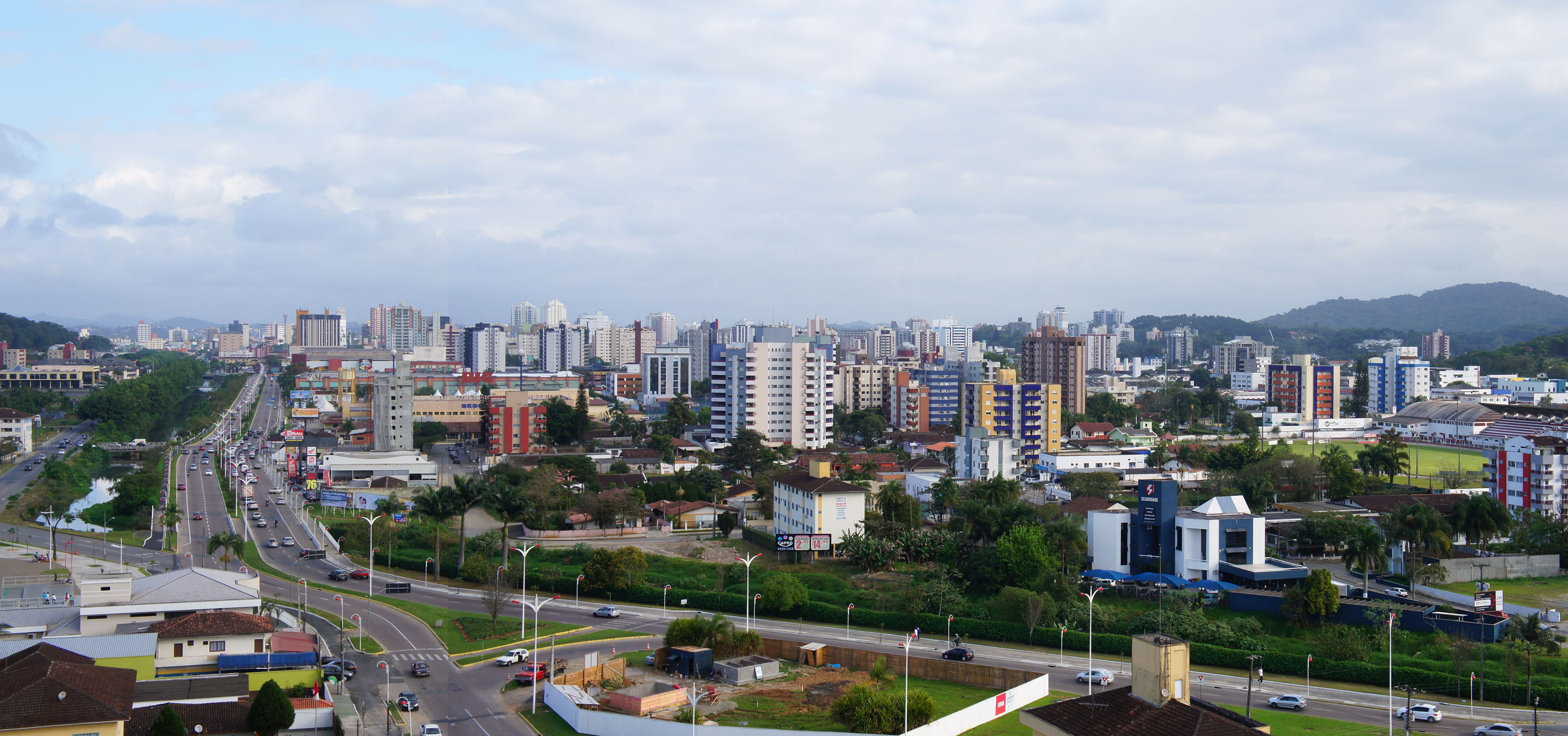
Overview of Joinville

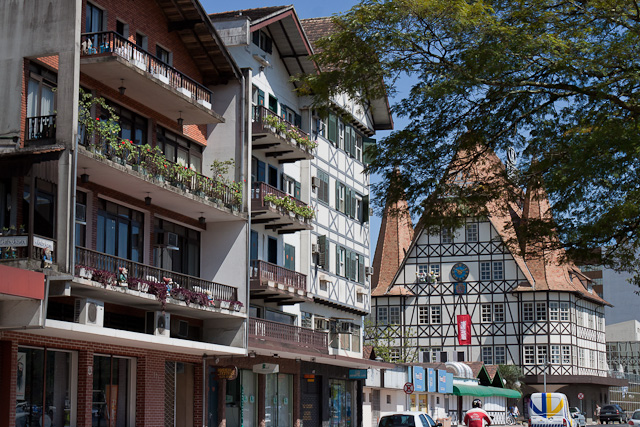
Castelinho of Moellmann in Blumenau

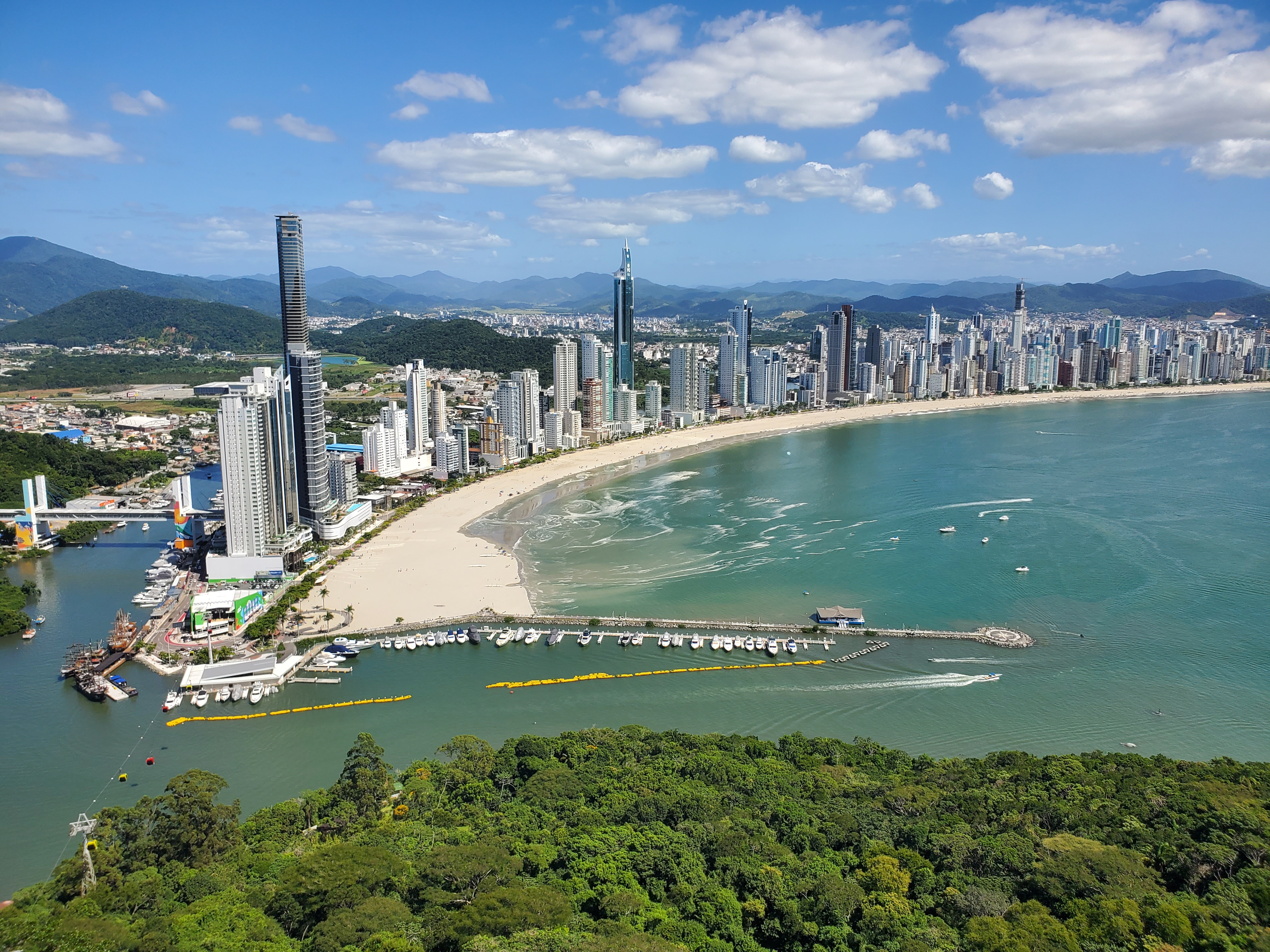
Partial view of Balneário Camboriú

† Region seat
†† State capital and region seat

15 largest municipalities in Santa Catarina by population in 2022
Rank	Municipality	Intermediate region	Population	Percentage of total population
1	Joinville †	Joinville	616,317	8.09%
2	Florianópolis ††	Florianópolis	537,211	7.05%
3	Blumenau †	Blumenau	361,261	4.74%
4	São José	Florianópolis	270,299	3.55%
5	Itajaí	Blumenau	264,054	3.46%
6	Chapecó †	Chapecó	254,785	3.34%
7	Palhoça	Florianópolis	222,598	2.92%
8	Criciúma †	Criciúma	214,493	2.81%
9	Jaraguá do Sul	Joinville	182,660	2.40%
10	Lages †	Lages	164,981	2.16%
11	Brusque	Blumenau	141,385	1.85%
12	Balneário Camboriú	Blumenau	139,155	1.82%
13	Tubarão	Criciúma	110,088	1.44%
14	Camboriú	Blumenau	103,074	1.35%
15	Navegantes	Blumenau	86,401	1.13%

=== Ethnicity ===
Ethnicities and racial groups of Santa Catarina in 2022
1. White (76.3%)
2. Pardo (mixed-race) (19.2%)
3. Black (4.07%)
4. Indigenous (0.25%)
5. Asian (0.18%)

According to the 2022 Brazilian census, the population of Santa Catarina was primarily composed of White Brazilians (76.28%), mixed race individuals (19.22%), Black Brazilians (4.07%), indigenous peoples (0.25%) and Asian Brazilians (0.18%).

Historically, the region was primarily inhabited by the Kaingang, Xokleng, and Guarani peoples, whose populations were reduced since the beginning of colonisation but have survived to the present day. During colonial Brazil, Spanish colonisers were the first to initiate settlement in the territory of Santa Catarina. However, the territory later came under Portuguese control, marked by Portuguese immigration and the arrival of African slaves. Subsequently, the territory experienced further population growth with the arrival of more Portuguese (especially Azoreans) and other European immigrants (Italians, Germans, Poles, Ukrainians, Lithuanians, Jews, Dutch, Belgians, Swiss, Austrians, French, English, Irish, Norwegians, Swedes, Danes, Czechs, Slovaks, Greeks, and Russians), as well as by the Japanese.

=== Languages ===
In Santa Catarina, two different groups of languages are spoken: indigenous languages and allochthonous languages, some of which are minority languages. There are three indigenous or native languages: Kaingang, Mbyá-Guarani, and Xokleng. With the European settlement of the state, allochthonous or immigrant languages emerged and persist today. These languages include Portuguese (by far the most widely spoken and used language in the state), Talian and other Italian dialects, High German variants, and Low German variants such as the Pomeranian dialect near Blumenau and Pomerode. Certain dialects were born in the region. Among them is Portuñol, a combination of Portuguese and Spanish spoken in the border regions with Argentina. And Katarinensisch, part of the Hunsrik dialect, originating from the national language of Germany. Other linguistic nuclei on a smaller scale include Spanish, Polish, Lithuanian, Japanese, Arabic, Yiddish and others.

=== Religions ===
According to the 2010 population census, the population of Santa Catarina comprises Roman Catholics (73.07%); Protestants or Evangelicals (20.4%); Spiritists (1.58%); Jehovah's Witnesses (0.74%); Mormons (0.11%); the Brazilian Catholic Apostolic Church (0.17%); Buddhists (0.05%); new Eastern religions (0.04%), among which Messianics constitute 0.03%; Muslims (0.01%); Orthodox Christians (0.07%); followers of Umbanda (0.14%); Jewish (0.02%); Spiritualists (0.03%); adherents of esoteric traditions (0.17%); Indigenous religions (0.03%); practitioners of Candomblé (0.09%); and Hindus (0.01%). Another 3.27% had no religion, including atheists (0.29%) and agnostics (0.6%); 0.29% followed other Christian denominations; 0.21% had an undetermined faith; 0.04% were unsure, 0.04% followed other Eastern religions, and 0.03% did not declare.

== Economy ==
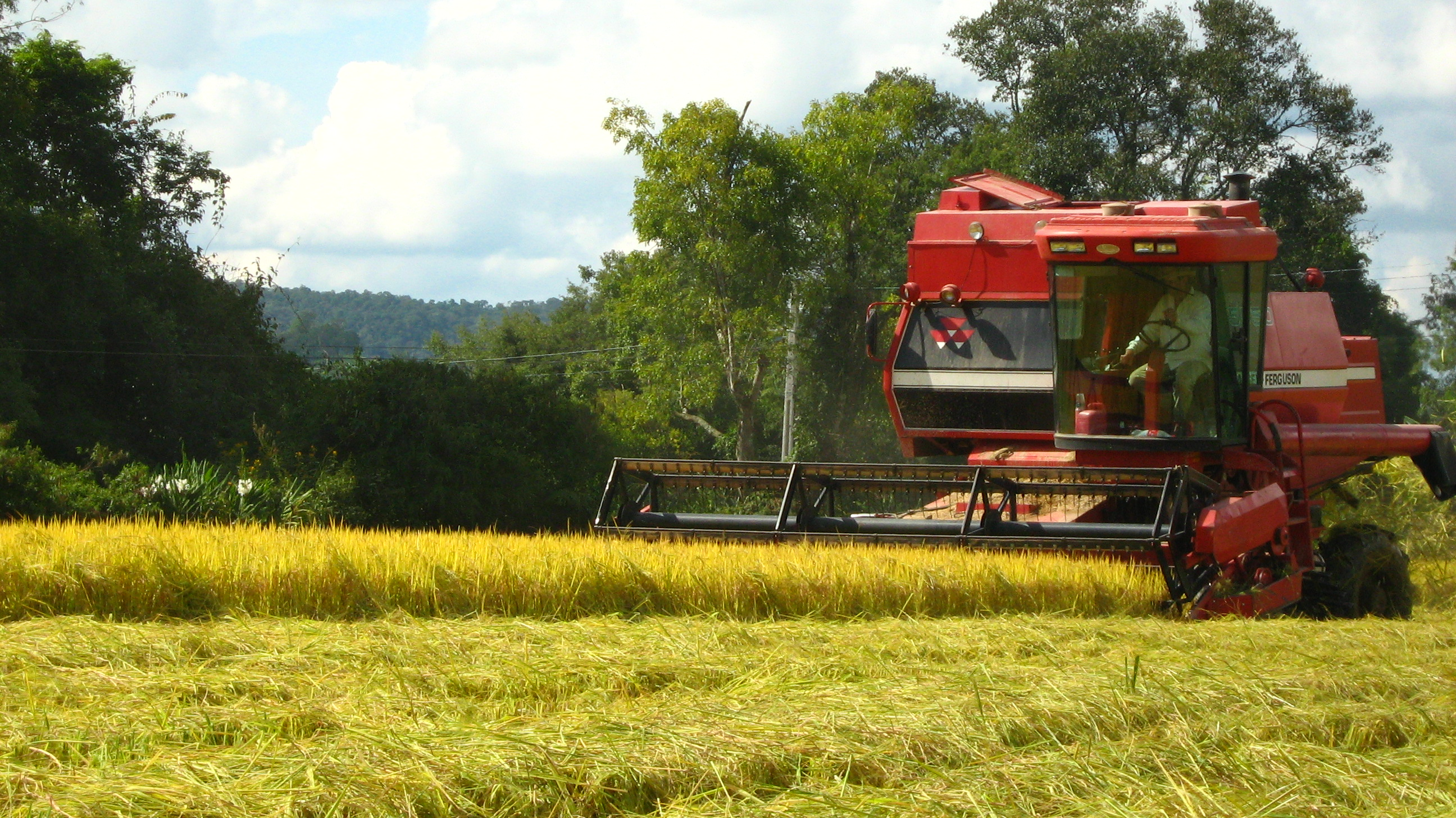
Rice plantation near Rio do Sul

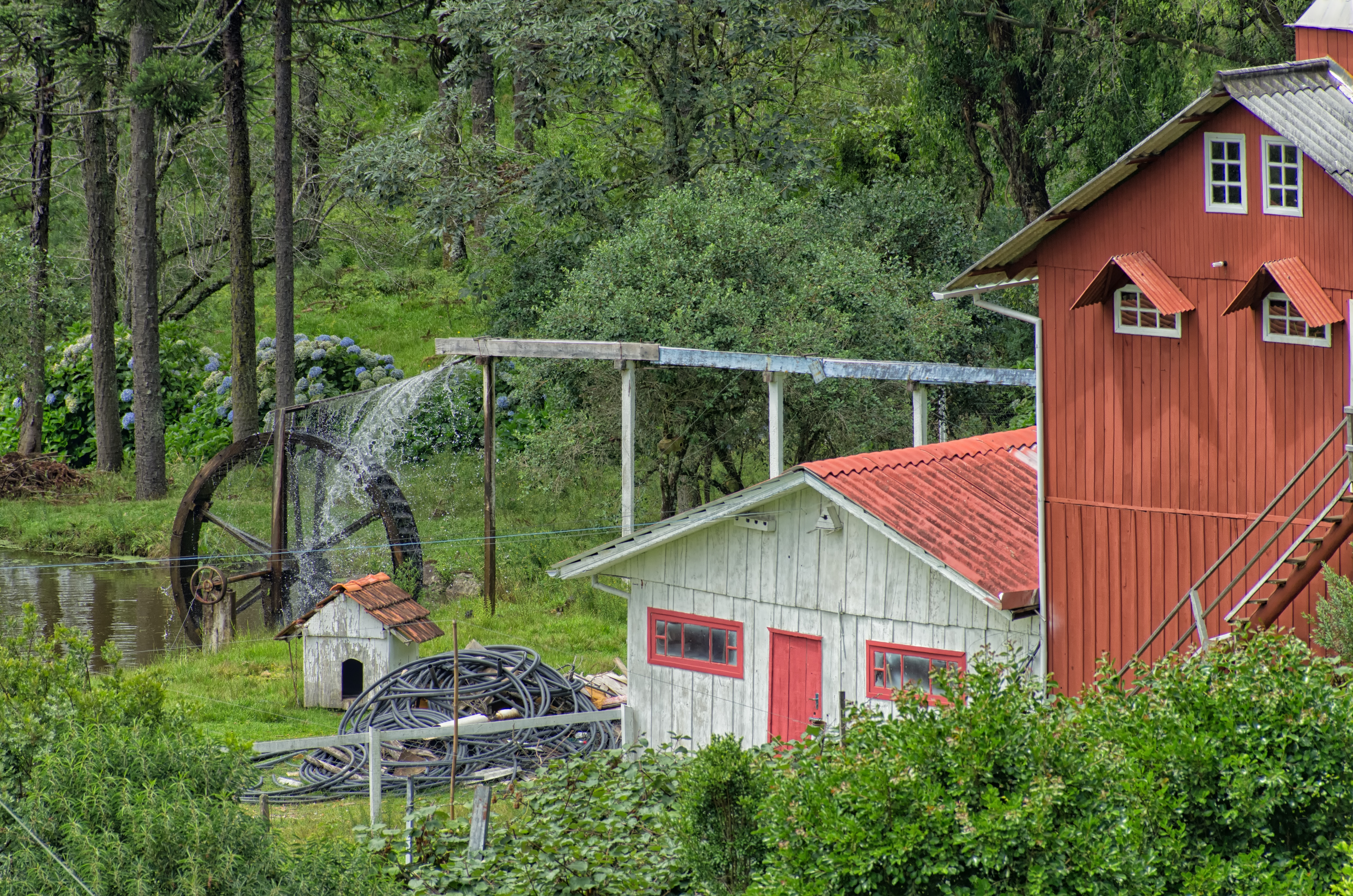
Family farm in Urubici

With only 1.12% of the national territory, Santa Catarina was the eighth-largest producer of maize and the eleventh-largest producer of soybeans in Brazil, in the year 2017. When production per unit area is considered, the State becomes the national leader in corn, with an average of 8,100 kilograms per hectare, and second in soybeans, with 3.580 kilos per hectare. In 15 years, there has been a 118% growth in corn productivity and 58% in soybean. In 2019, corn production in the state reached 2.8 million tons (in 2018, Brazil was the third-largest producer in the world, with 82 million tons. However, the annual demand for corn in the state is 7 million tons—97% is for animal consumption, especially for pigs and broilers (83.8%), as Santa Catarina has the largest pig population among Brazilian states and the second largest in poultry. The corn deficit is covered by interstate imports, mainly from Mato Grosso do Sul, Mato Grosso, Paraná and Goiás, and from countries like Argentina and Paraguay. In soy production, in 2019 the state harvested 2.3 million tons (Brazil produced 116 million tons this year, being the largest producer in the world).

The state was the second-largest rice producer in the country in 2020, second only to the Rio Grande do Sul, harvesting around 1.1 million tons of the product. Total national production was 10.5 million tons this year.

The three Southern States of the country are responsible for 95% of the national apple production, and Santa Catarina tops, competing with the Rio Grande do Sul. The São Joaquim region is responsible for 35% of the apple planting.

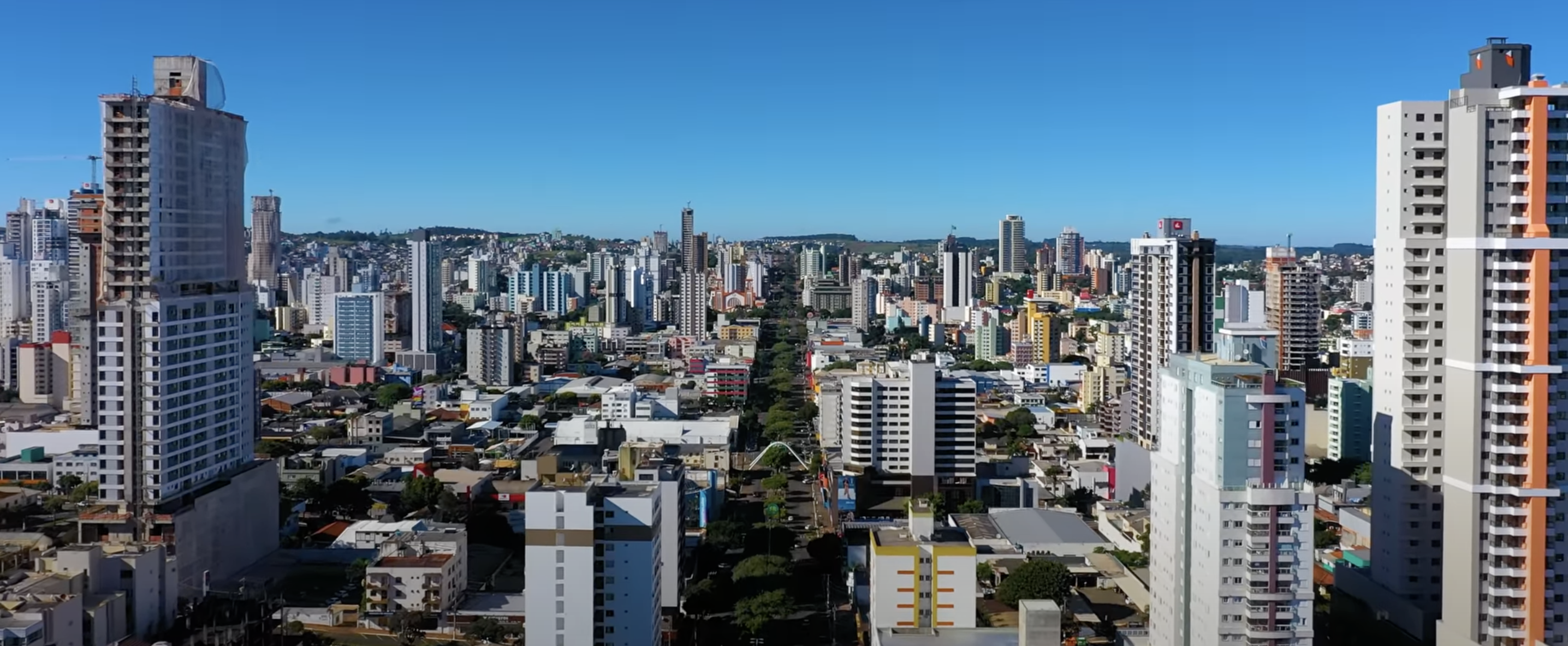
Chapecó is the main city in the Western Santa Catarina

Santa Catarina is also a national leader in the production of onions. In 2017, it produced 630,000 tons, especially in the municipalities of Alfredo Wagner, Angelina and Rancho Queimado.

In banana production, Santa Catarina was the fourth-largest national producer in 2018.

Santa Catarina was the third-largest producer of garlic in Brazil in 2018, with a planted area of approximately two thousand hectares. The Curitibanos region is the largest producer in the state.

Santa Catarina is one of the few states in the country that cultivate barley. In the 2007–2011 period, the state had 2.5% of national production. The cultivation was concentrated in the microregions of Canoinhas (57.6%), Curitibanos (26.5%) and Xanxerê (11.5%). It is also one of the few states that cultivate wheat, due to its favourable climate. In 2019 the estimated production of the state was 150,000 tons, still small compared to the 2.3 million tons produced by both Rio Grande do Sul and Paraná. Since the country has to import these two cereals in high volume every year, the state has been trying to stimulate the production of winter grain crops with incentive programs.

Santa Catarina produced close to 100,000 tons of yerba mate in 2018, mainly in the cities of Chapecó and Canoinhas.

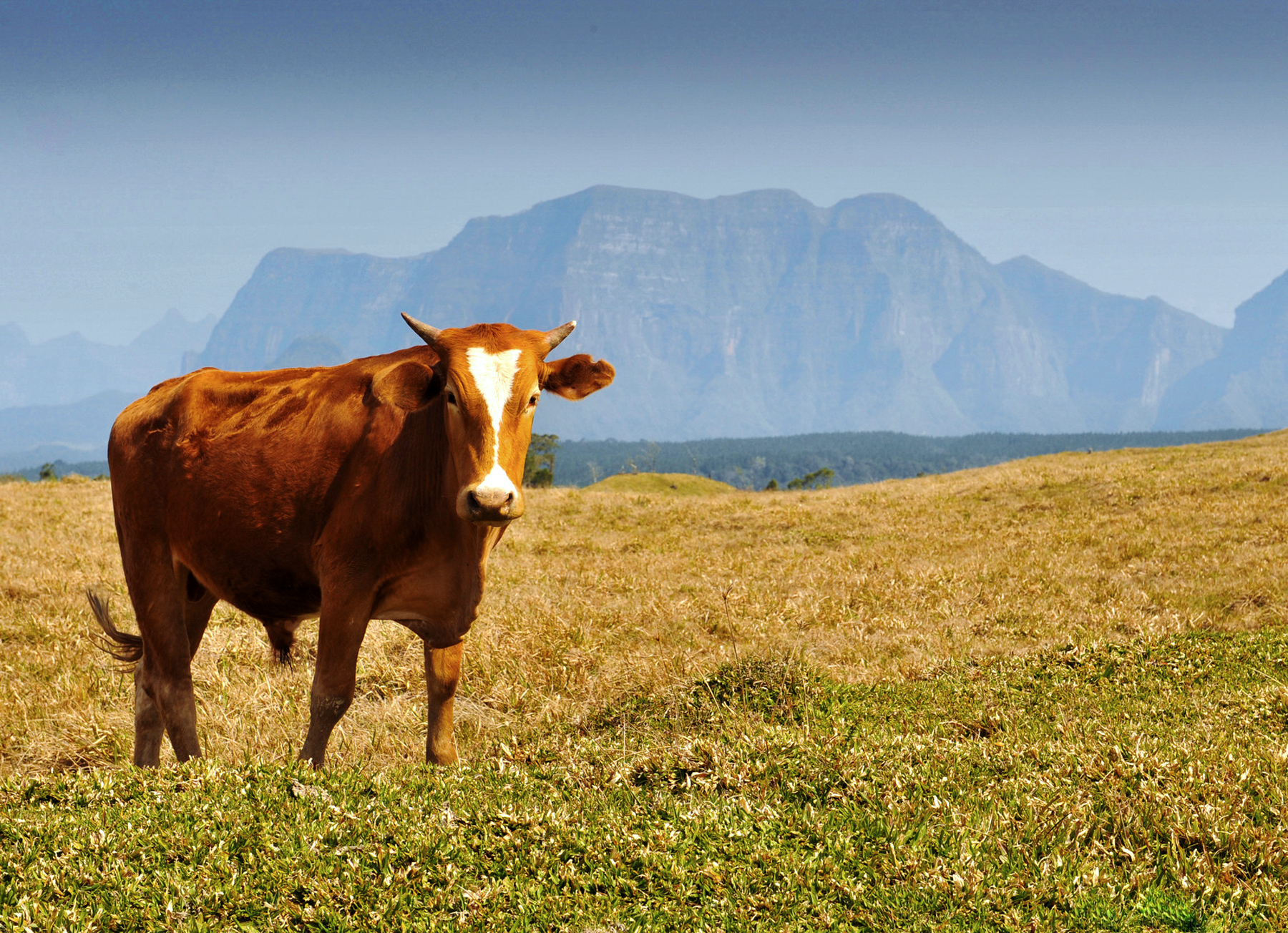
Cattle in Santa Catarina

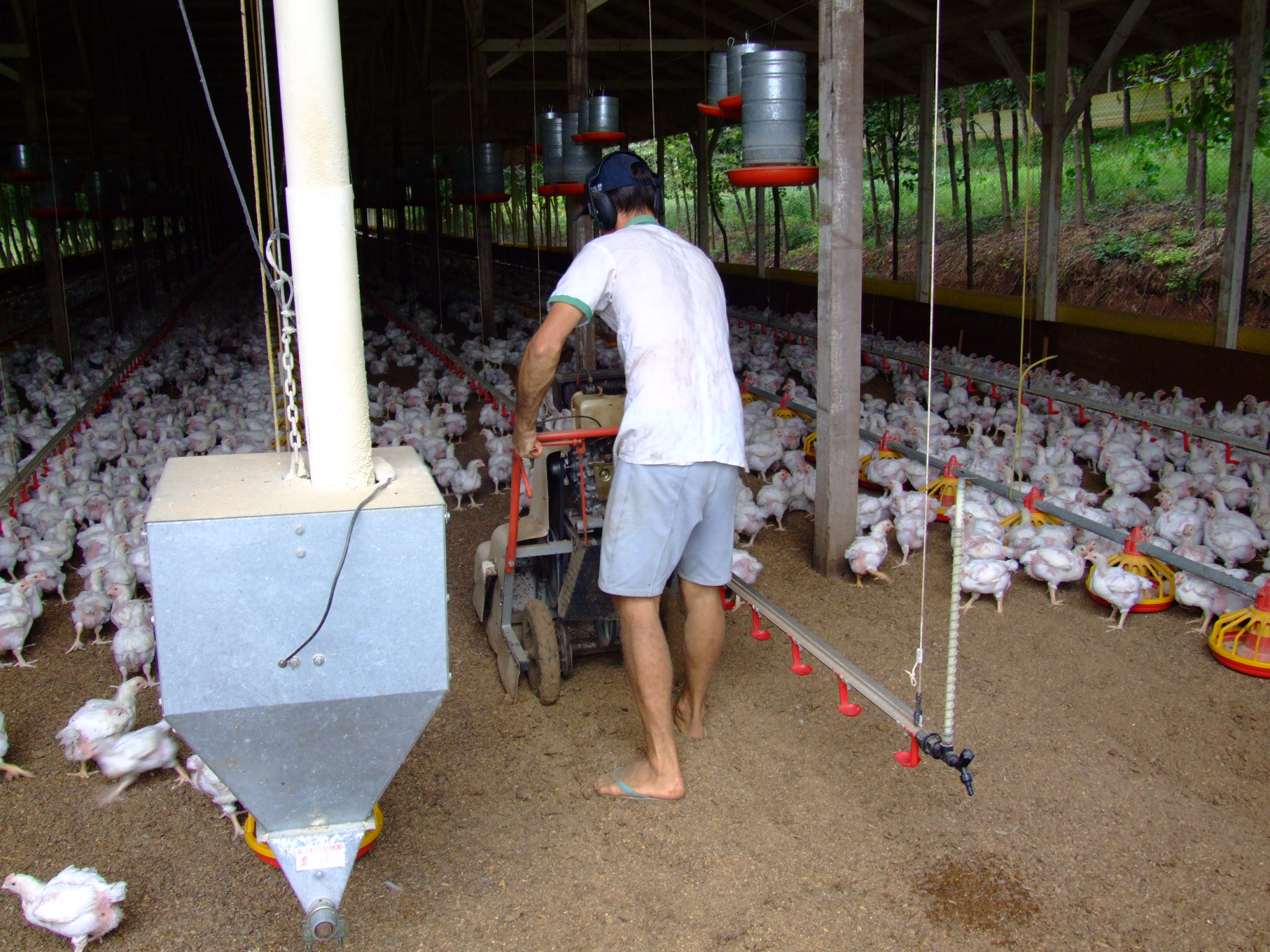
Poultry in Campos Novos

The state had an annual production of about 23,000 tons of grapes in 2019, with 86% of the state production located in the municipalities of Caçador, Pinheiro Preto, Tangará and Videira. Most of the national production, however, is located in Rio Grande do Sul (664,200 tons in 2018).

Santa Catarina is the largest producer of pork in Brazil. The state is responsible for 28.38% of the country's slaughter and 40.28% of Brazilian pork exports. The number of pigs in Brazil was 41.1 million in 2017. Santa Catarina had 19.7% of the total.

The number of chickens in Brazil was 1.4 billion in 2017. Santa Catarina had 10.8% of the national total, the fourth largest in the country.

Brazil is the fifth-largest milk producer in the world, having produced almost 34 billion liters in 2018, 4% of world production. Santa Catarina was responsible for 8.78% of the national production, almost 3 billion liters of milk. In the production of chicken eggs, Santa Catarina represented 4.58% of the national total, which was 3.6 billion dozens in 2018. The state alone was responsible for 165 million dozens.

In cattle raising, Brazil had almost 215 million head in 2017. Santa Catarina had about 5 million head of cattle in 2018.

Santa Catarina was the fifth-largest honey producer in the country in 2017, with 10.2% of the national total.

Fishing plays an important role in the state's economy. The production of oysters, scallops and mussels in Brazil was 20,900 tons in 2017. Santa Catarina was the main producer, responsible for 98.1%. Palhoça, Florianópolis and Bombinhas led the ranking of municipalities.

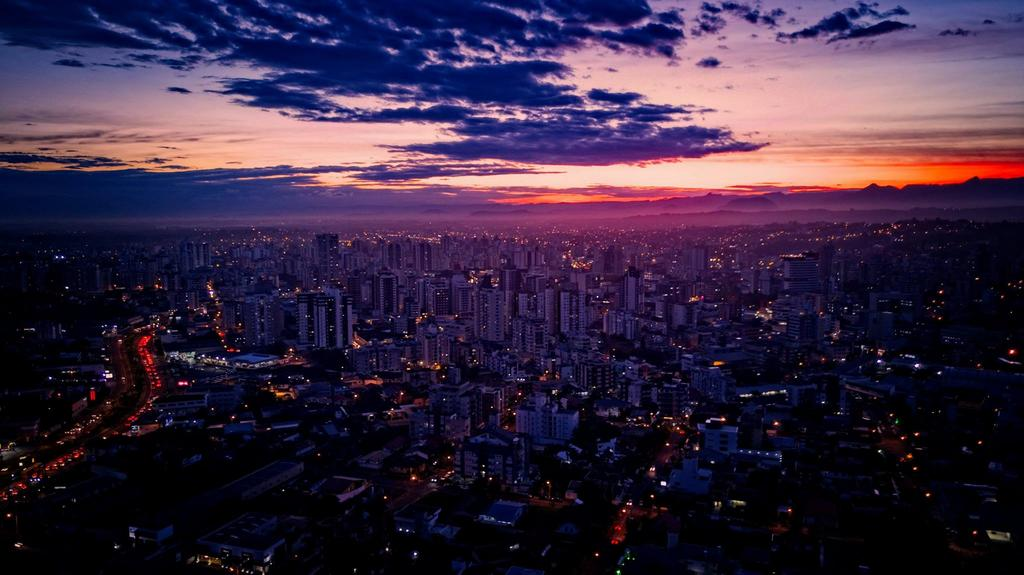
Sunset in Criciúma

Santa Catarina is the largest coal producer in Brazil, mainly in Criciúma city and its surroundings. The production of crude mineral coal in Brazil was 13.6 million tons (Mt) in 2007. Santa Catarina produced 8.7 Mt; the Rio Grande do Sul, 4.5 Mt; and Paraná, 0.4 Mt. Despite the extraction of mineral coal in Brazil, the country still needs to import about 50% of the coal consumed, as the coal produced in the country is of low quality, with a lower concentration of carbon. Brazil's coal reserves are 32 billion tons and are mainly in the Rio Grande do Sul (89.25% of the total), followed by Santa Catarina (10.41%). The Candiota Deposit (RS) alone has 38% of all national coal. As it is the coal of inferior quality, it is used only in the generation of thermoelectric energy and at the site of the deposit. The oil crisis in the 1970s led the Brazilian government to create the Energy Mobilization Plan, with intense efforts to discover new coal reserves. The Geological Survey of Brazil, through works carried out in the Rio Grande, do Sul and Santa Catarina greatly increased the reserves of coal previously known, between 1970 and 1986 (mainly between 1978 and 1983). In 2011, coal accounted for only 5.6% of the energy consumed in Brazil, but it is a strategic alternate source that can be activated when, for example, low water levels in dams reduce hydroelectric power generation. This happened in 2013, when several thermoelectric plants were shut down to maintain the necessary supply, albeit at a higher cost.

Santa Catarina had an industrial GDP of R$63.2 billion in 2017, equivalent to 5.3% of the national industry. It employs 761,072 workers in the industry. The main sectors are Construction (17.9%), Food (15.9%), Clothing (7.4%), Industrial Public Utility Services, such as Electricity and Water (6.9%), and Textiles (6.0%). These 5 sectors constitute 54.1% of the state's industry.

The main industrial centers in Santa Catarina are Jaraguá do Sul, Joinville, Chapecó and Blumenau. The first is diversified, with factories of fabrics, food products, foundries, and the mechanical industry. Chapecó's economy is based on agribusiness. Blumenau concentrates on the textile industry (together with Gaspar and Brusque) and recently also on software. In the interior of the state, there are numerous small manufacturing centers, linked to both the use of wood in industry and the processing of agricultural and pastoral products.

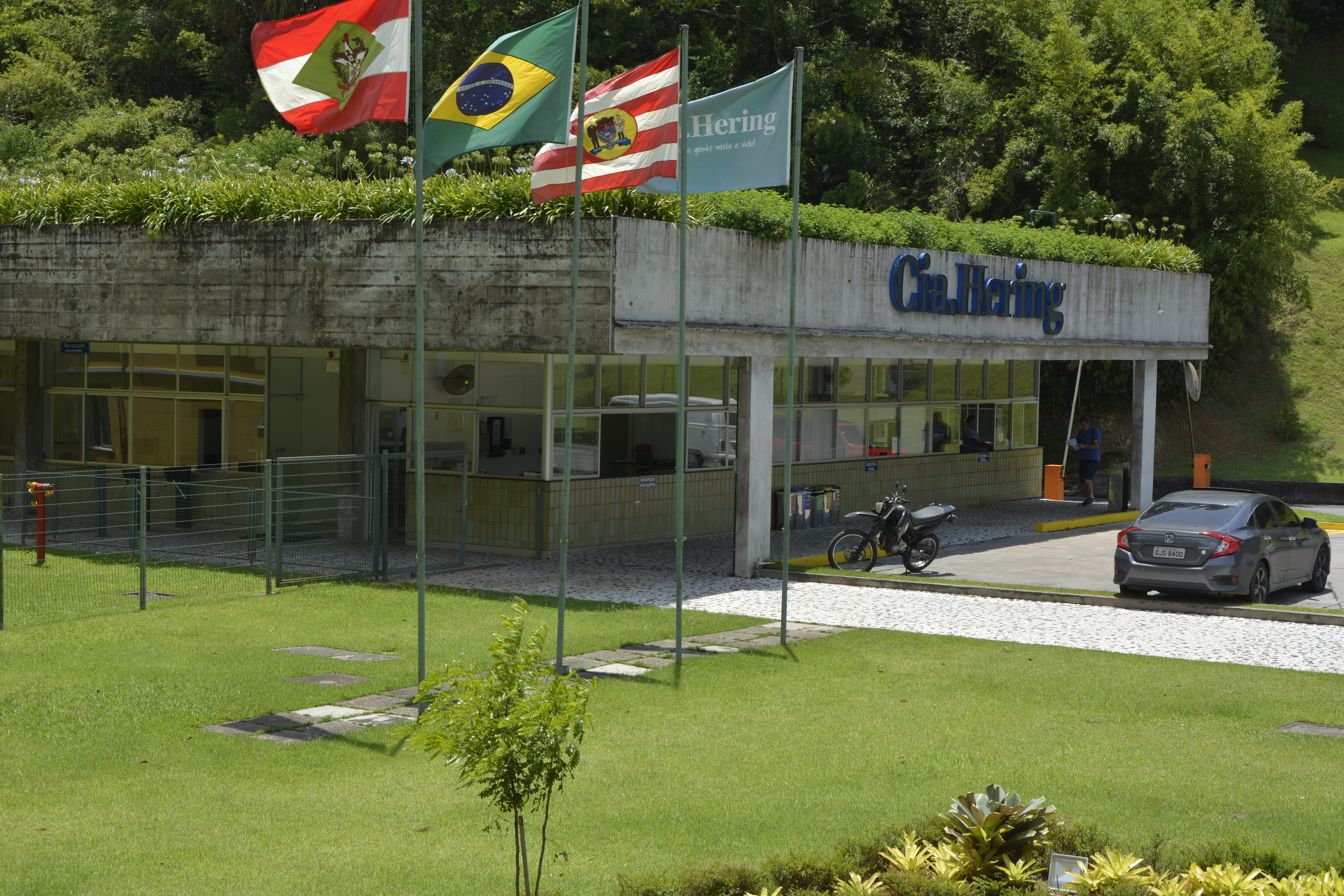
Hering headquarters, in Blumenau

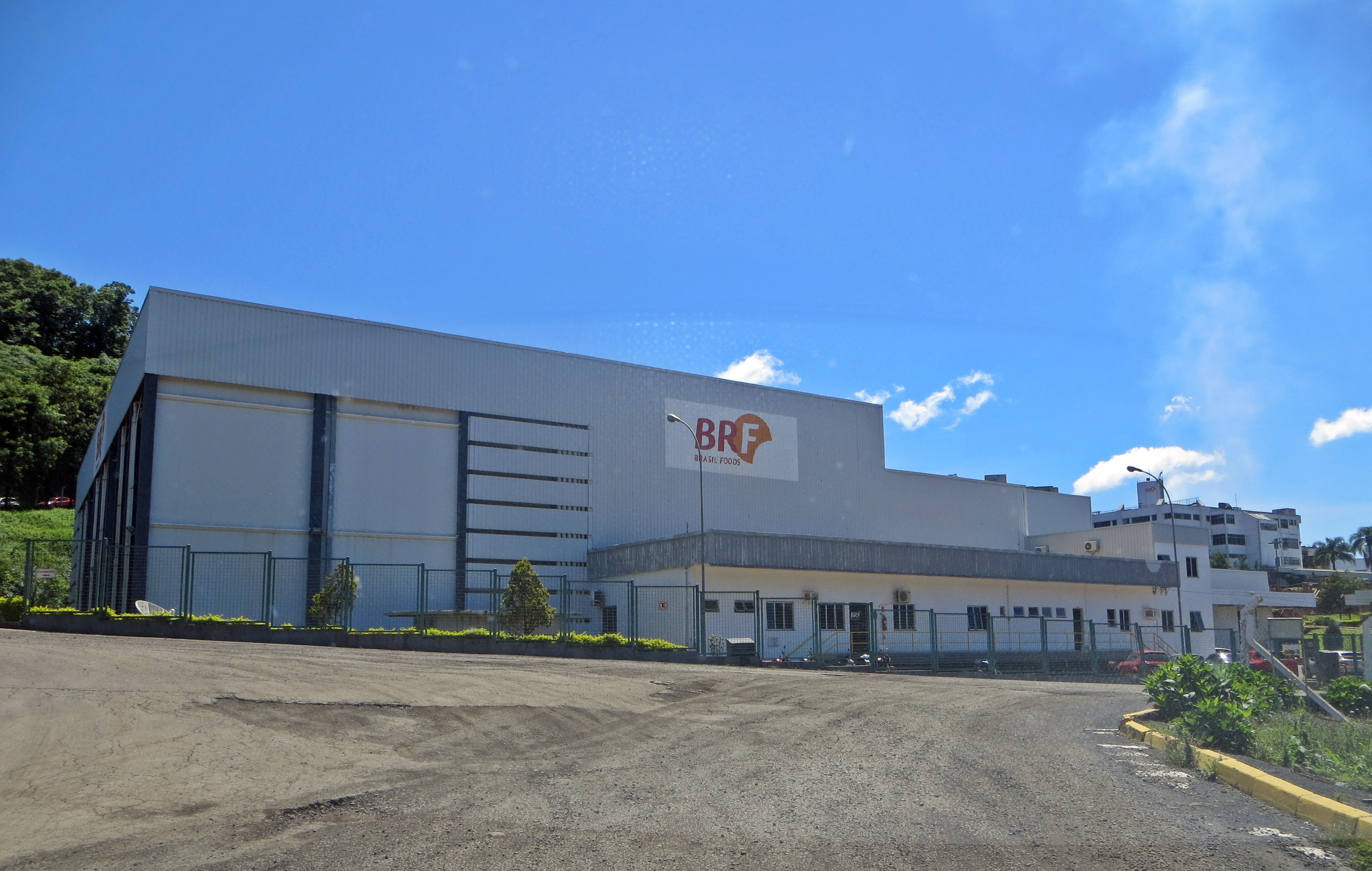
Perdigão Headquarters, in Videira

In the textile industry, Santa Catarina stands out. Brazil, despite being among the five largest producers in the world in 2013, and a large consumer of textile and clothing, do not participate proportionately in global trade. In 2015, Brazilian imports ranked 25th (US$5.5 billion), and in exports, it was only 40th in the world. At 0.3% market share in the global textile and clothing trade, Brazil is constrained by uncompetitive pricing compared to producers in China and India. The gross value of production, which includes consumption of intermediate goods and services, by the Brazilian textile industry, corresponds to almost R$40 billion in 2015, 1.6% of the gross value of Industrial Production in Brazil. The South has 32.65% of production, Among the main textile clusters in Brazil, the Vale do Itajaí (SC) stand out. In 2015, Santa Catarina was the second-largest textile and clothing employer in Brazil. It led in the manufacture of pillows and is the largest producer in Latin America and the second in the world in woven labels. It is the largest exporter in the country of toilet/kitchen clothes, cotton terry cloth fabrics, and cotton knit shirts. Some of the most famous companies in the region are Hering, Malwee, Karsten and Haco.

In the food industry, Brazil was the second-largest exporter of processed foods in the world in 2019, with a value of US$34.1 billion in exports. The Brazilian food and beverage industry's revenue in 2019 was R$699.9 billion, 9.7% of the country's gross domestic product. In 2015, the industrial food and beverage sector in Brazil comprised 34,800 companies (not counting bakeries), the vast majority of which were small. These companies employed more than 1.6 million workers, making the food and beverage industry the largest employer in the manufacturing industry. There are around 570 large companies in Brazil, which constitute a major proportion of industry revenues. Companies such as Sadia and Perdigão (which later merged into BRF), Seara Alimentos (which today belongs to JBS), Aurora (all meat specialists), Gomes da Costa (fish and canned), Eisenbahn Brewery and Hemmer Alimentos (specialist in preserves such as cucumber, beet, heart of palm, among others) are based in Santa Catarina.

In the automotive sector, the state has GM and BMW plants.

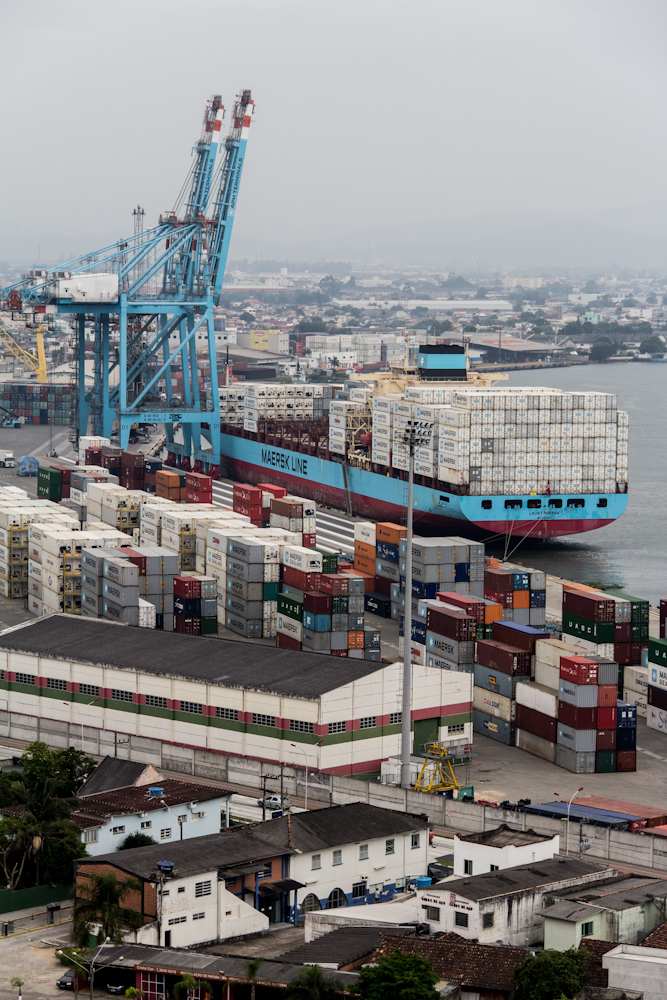
The Port of Itajaí is one of the main ports of Brazil.

The wood and paper industry is concentrated in (Canoinhas, Três Barras and Mafra) in the north of Santa Catarina, due to raw material availability in the region. In the Serra industries (Rio Negrinho and São Bento do Sul), wood-processing works are carried out, producing various derivatives and final products. The state stands out nationally in the production of wooden furniture. Most companies in this sector are based in these cities, together with Palhoça. The state's industry accounts for 7.5% of the national sector. The state is the second-largest furniture exporter in the country (2014). The Santa Catarina timber industry stands out with a 17.1% share in Brazil. It is among the largest in the country in the production of wooden doors and is a national leader in frames.

Responsible for handling R$6.5 billion in gross value of the Industrial Production of Santa Catarina, the paper and cellulose sector is one of the most important economic vocations in the mountainous part of the state. The sector is 8th highest in exports and 10th in job creation in Santa Catarina, with more than 20,200 vacancies, according to data from 2015. The municipalities of Lages and Otacílio Costa together represent about 47% of the exports of the Pulp and Paper sector State role.

Brazil's ceramic tile factories are mainly based in the south of Santa Catarina (including the cities of Imbituba, Tubarão, Criciúma, Forquilhinha, Içara and Urussanga). The state of Santa Catarina also leads the country in the production of crockery and crystals.

The northeast of the state is notable for the production of moto-compressors, auto parts, refrigerators, engines and electrical components, industrial machines, tubes, and connections. Its compressor production makes it a leader in exports among Brazil's states. It is also an important producer of forestry equipment. In metallurgy, the state has the largest national manufacturer of stainless steel sinks, vats, tanks, trophies, medals, fixing elements (screws, nuts, etc.), jacketed tanks for fuels, industrial pressure vessels, and malleable iron connections. It is a world leader in engine blocks and iron heads, being Brazil's largest exporter of this product.

In the leather-footwear sector (footwear industry), the state has a production center in São João Batista.

In the household appliances industry, sales of white goods (refrigerators, air conditioning, and others) were 12.9 million units in 2017. The sector had its peak in 2012, with 18.9 million units. The brands that sold the most were Brastemp, Electrolux, Consul and Philips. Consul is originally from Santa Catarina, having merged with Brastemp and is now a part of the multinational Whirlpool Corporation.

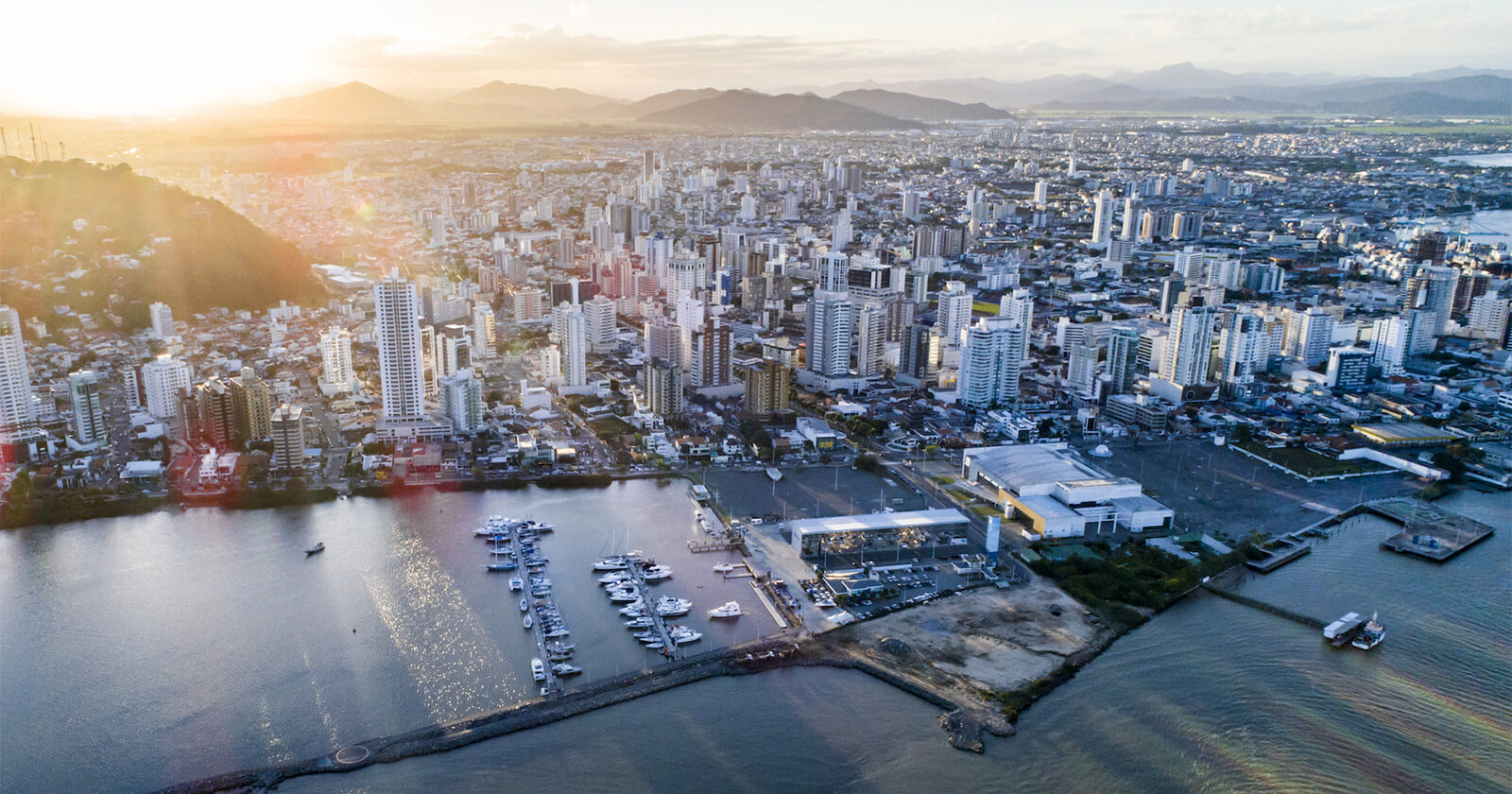
View of Itajaí

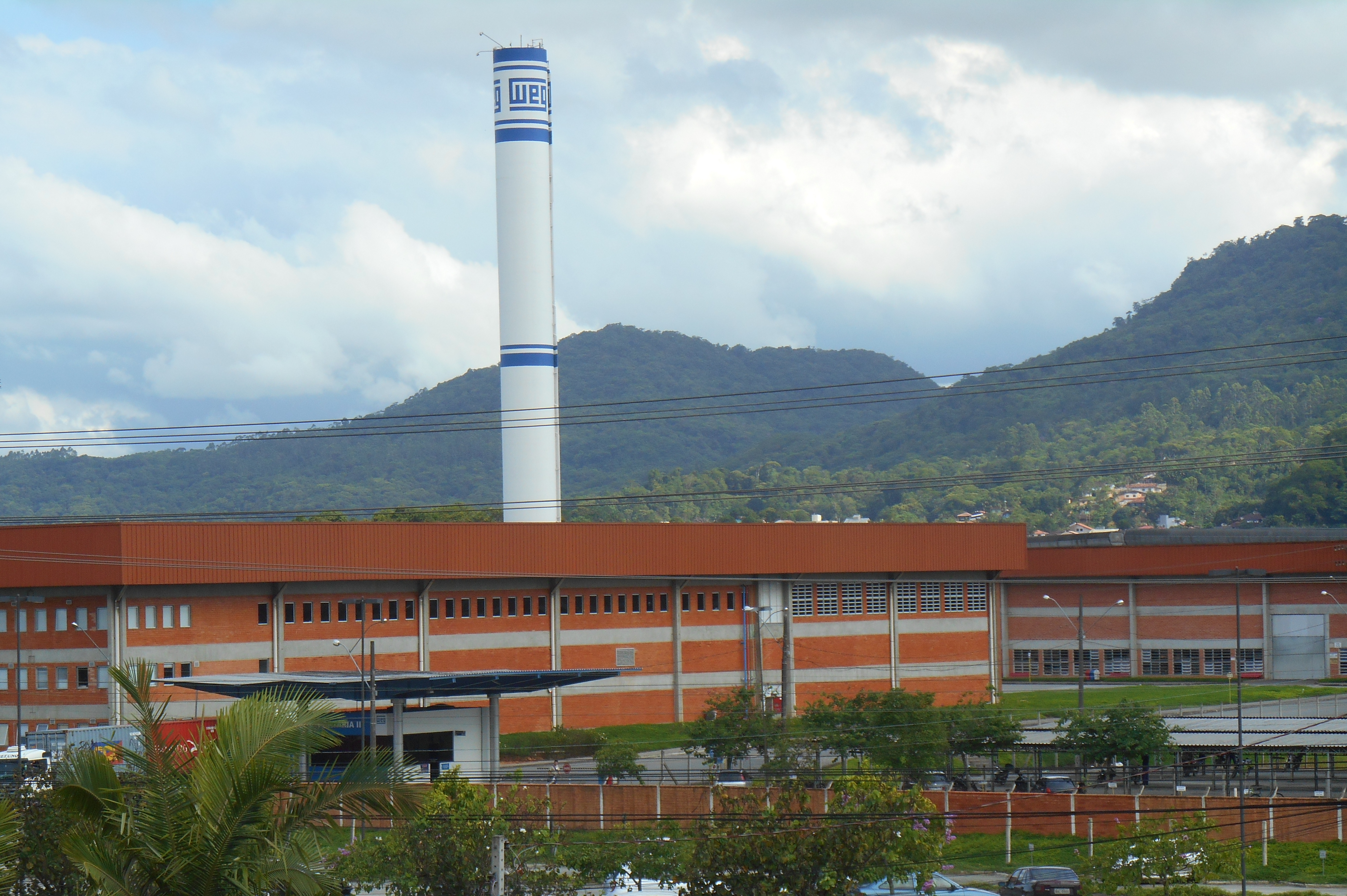
WEG, one of the largest electrical equipment manufacturers in the world

The major cities and their respective fields are:

- Florianópolis, technology; tourism; services; commerce; government; education
- Joinville, metal-mechanic; automobile; tourism/events; software development; commerce; plastic; textile; chemistry; education
- Blumenau, textile; software; commerce and beer
- São José, industry; commerce and services
- Criciúma, ceramics
- Chapecó, cattle and poultry breeding
- Lages tourism and wood industry
- Itajaí, seaport
- Jaraguá do Sul, electric motors and textile
- Palhoça, industry
- Balneário Camboriú, tourism; commerce
- Tubarão, ceramics
- Brusque, textile
- Rio Negrinho, furniture
- Caçador, furniture; metal-mechanics; agribusiness
- Campos Novos, agribusiness
- Concórdia, Swine industry
- Curitibanos, Agribusiness, wood industry, education
- São Joaquim, tourism

=== Statistics ===
Vehicles: 2,489,343 (March/2007); Mobile phones: 3.7 million (April/2007); Telephones: 1.6 million (April/2007). Cities: 293 (2007)

== Infrastructure ==
=== Roads ===
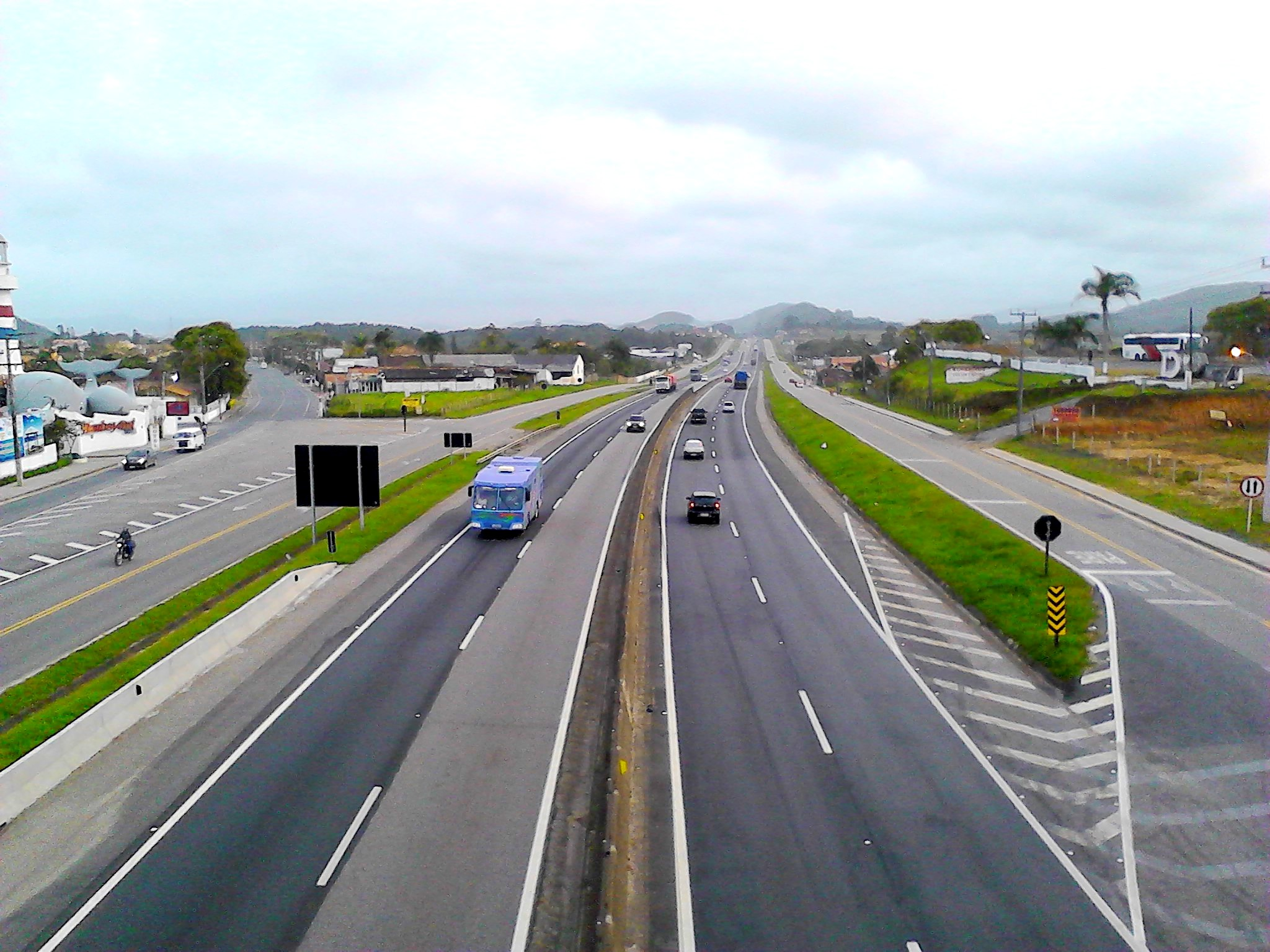
BR-101 near Barra Velha

In 2019, Santa Catarina had 62,871 km of highways, 9,321 km of which were paved, and of these, 556 km were duplicated highways.

The main highway is the BR-101, which is fully duplicated, passing along the coast, where most of the 25 cities in the state of Santa Catarina with the highest GDP are located. Other major highways in the state are BR-470 and BR-280, which are currently undergoing duplication works, BR-116, BR-282, BR-153 and BR-158.

=== Airports ===
As it is a state without large metropolises, with cities with no more than 600 thousand inhabitants, Santa Catarina has some important airports spread across the state. Five of them carry out commercial flights:

Florianópolis, the capital, is served by Hercílio Luz International Airport for both domestic and international flights. The traffic has grown significantly and in October 2019, a new airport was opened to serve 2.7 million passengers a year.

In Navegantes, there is the Navegantes Airport, the second largest in Santa Catarina and the main gateway to the Vale do Itajaí Region, made up of 12 municipalities with a GDP of R$49 billion, which corresponds to 15.3% of the state's GDP. The airport has a capacity for 3.5 million passengers per year.

In Joinville, there is the Joinville-Lauro Carneiro de Loyola Airport, which serves the largest city in the state of Santa Catarina, with 590 thousand inhabitants. The Joinville region is responsible for 18.3% of the state's GDP and is one of the most important industrial hubs in the development of the south of the country. The airport has a capacity for 800 thousand passengers/year.

In Chapecó, there is the Chapecó Airport, which serves the largest city in the west of the state. The airport handles around 500,000 passengers per year.

In the area close to Criciúma, Brazil's famous coal region, Jaguaruna Regional Airport was opened in 2014, which in 2023 handled around 120,000 passengers per year.

=== Ports ===
The state has five specialized ports—Itajaí, São Francisco do Sul, Itapoá, Imbituba and Navegantes—the first two being of great importance. São Francisco do Sul is a major exporter of soy, wood and cellulose, and importer of steel material, such as steel bars and coils, in addition to fertilizers and urea. Itajaí exports a lot of chicken, wood and meat products and imports mechanical and electronic products, chemicals and miscellaneous textiles. Imbituba represents a coal terminal and Laguna, a fishing port. Itajaí had a cargo movement of 18.9 million tons in 2021, and São Francisco do Sul, 13.6 million, being among the ten largest in the country.

== Tourism ==
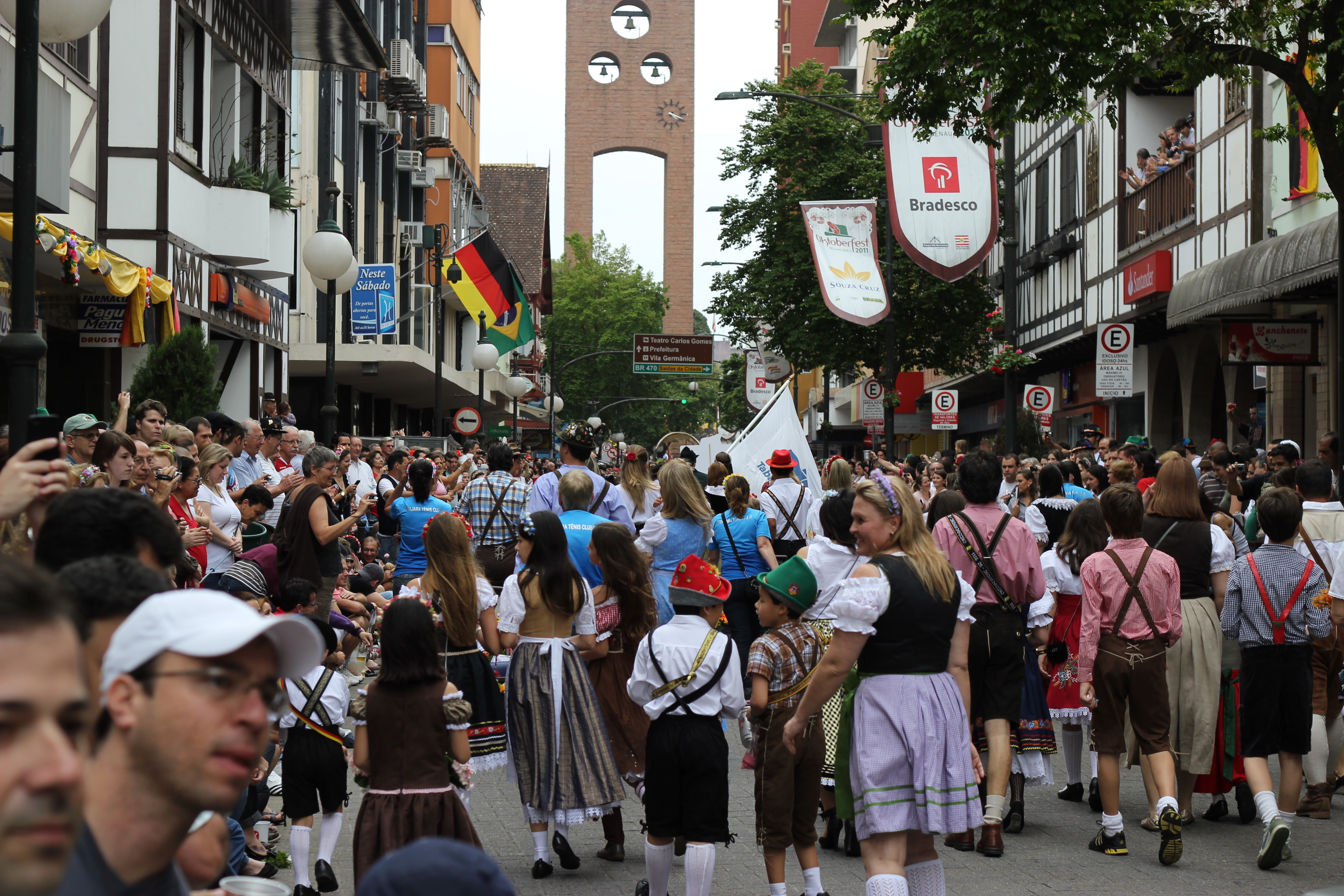
Oktoberfest of Blumenau

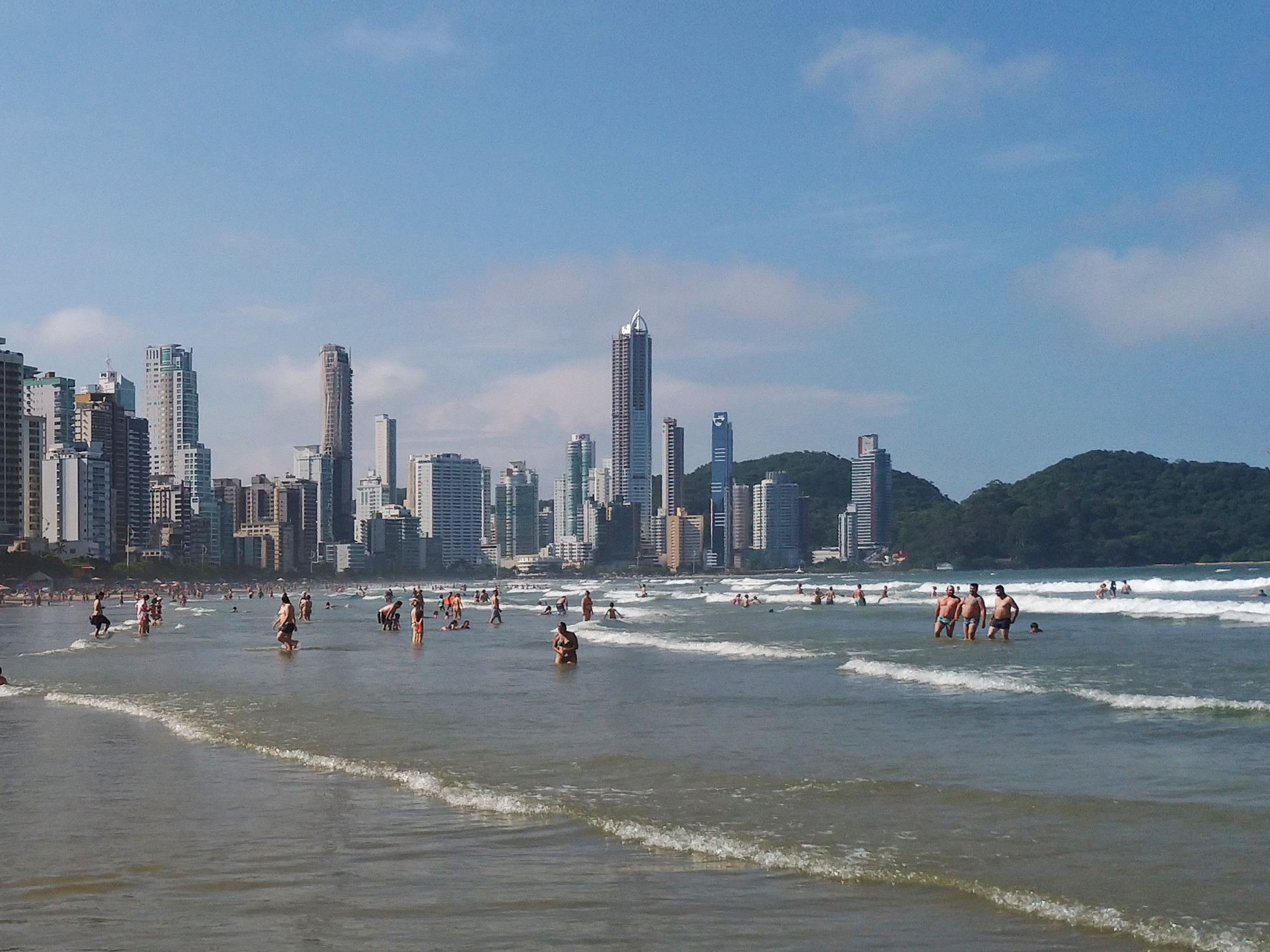
Balneário Camboriú

Santa Catarina offers several destinations and events throughout the year: rural tourism, thermal resorts, ecological tourism, and adventure sports, historic monuments and sights, religious tourism, Beto Carrero World and Unipraias parks in Balneário Camboriú, and beach resorts of Florianópolis, Laguna, Porto Belo and Itajaí.

Some of these sights can only be seen in the off-season, like the snow on the Catarinense Mountain Range—one of the places in Brazil where it snows every year.

Between July and November, southern right whales visit the state's coast. The municipality of Timbó is a center for adventure sports like rafting and canyoning.

The popular festivities take place in October. The Oktoberfest of Blumenau is Brazil's largest and the world's second largest (after Germany's Munich).

Joinville is the host city in July to the widely acclaimed "Joinville Dance Festival", the annual "Festival of Flowers" in November which showcases orchids produced in the region, and several business events in its Convention Center.

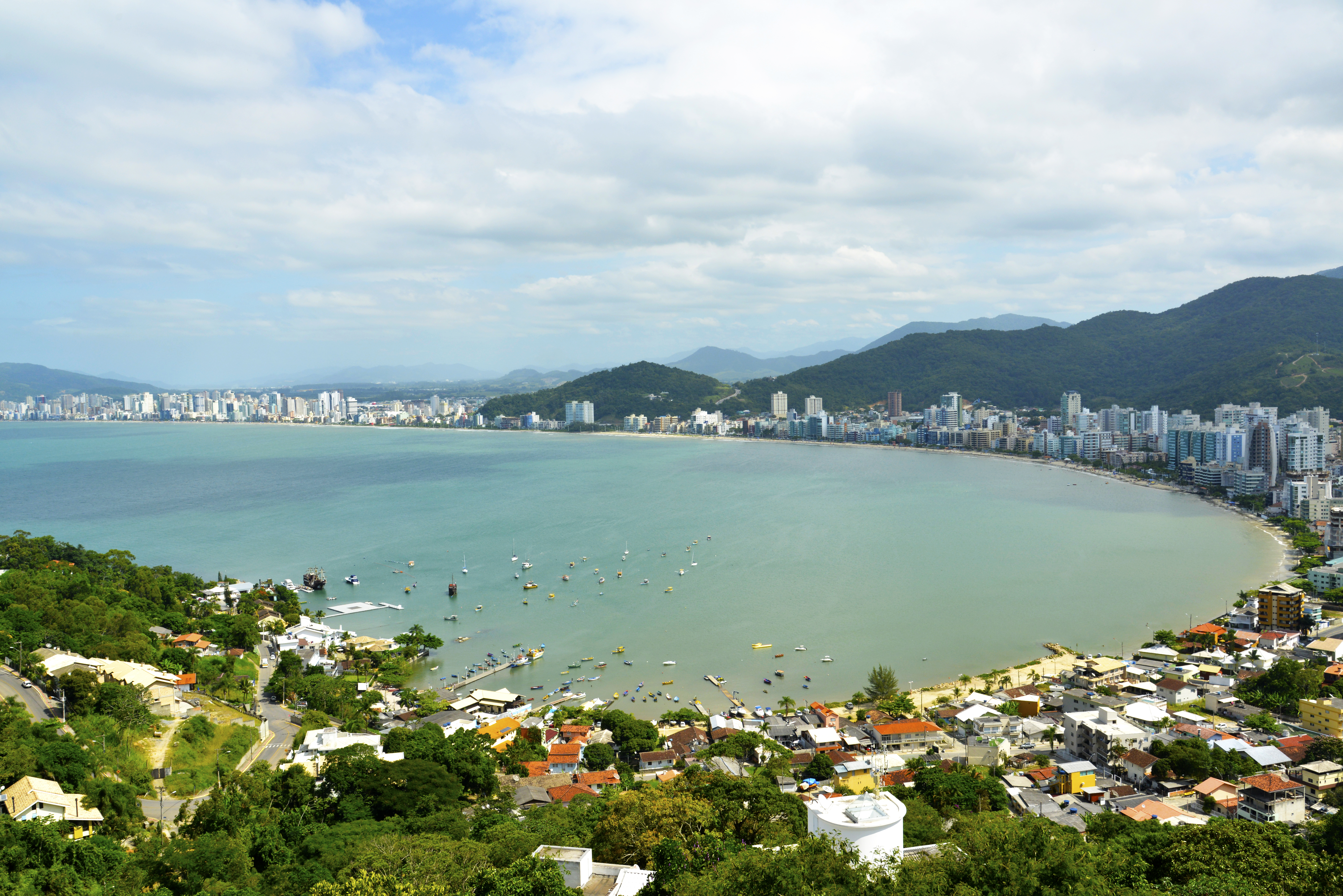
View of Itapema

Urubici is another ecotourism destination.

Florianópolis, the city/island State Capital attracts a large number of tourists during the summer months who visit its 42 beaches.

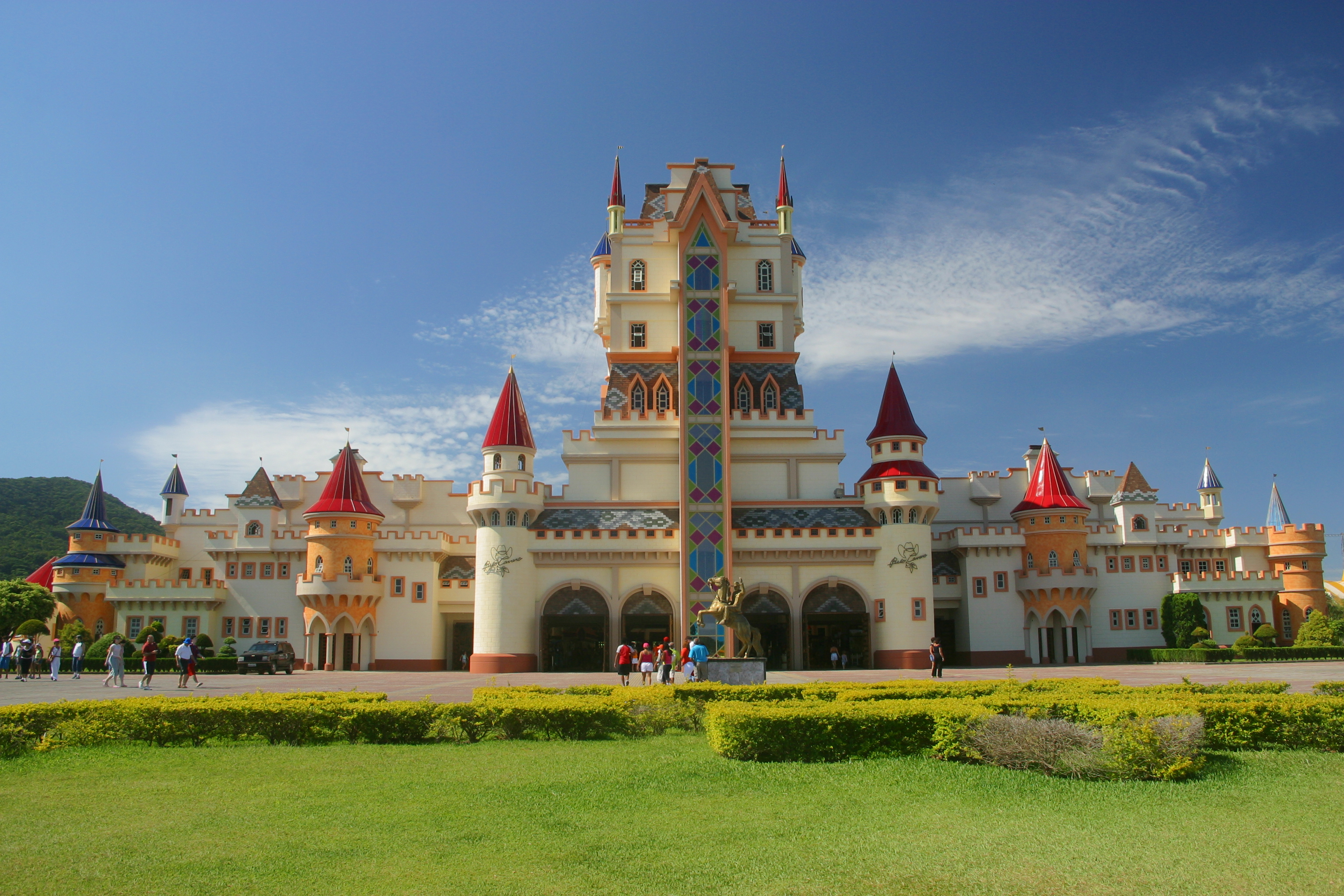
Beto Carrero World is the largest theme park in Latin America.

There are also many smaller resort towns, including the capital of the microlight aircraft tour flights Itapema, Piçarras, Barra Velha, and Penha, home to the famous amusement park Beto Carrero World.

An interesting collaboration between humans and wildlife has developed in Laguna (birthplace of Anita Garibaldi, the wife and comrade-in-arms of Italian Unification revolutionary Giuseppe Garibaldi): a pod of bottlenose dolphins drive fish towards fishermen who stand at the beach in shallow waters. Then one dolphin rolls over, which the fishermen take as a sign to cast their nets. The dolphins feed on the escaping fish. The dolphins were not trained for this behavior; the collaboration has been reported since 1847. Southern right whales also can be seen in Laguna from the shore during the winter to spring seasons.

The 17,491 hectares (43,220 acres) Turvo State Park, created in 1947, is in the northwest of the state. It contains the Yucumã Falls (Portuguese: Salto do Yucumã, Spanish: Saltos del Moconá), a dramatic waterfall on the Uruguay River on the Argentinian border. Many tourists come to the park to see the falls, which are 1,800 metres (5,900 ft) long and up to 20 metres (66 ft) high.

== Sports ==
In the state of Santa Catarina, important athletes were born such as: Gustavo Kuerten, the greatest male tennis player in the country's history; Pedro Barros, one of the most important skaters in the country along with Bob Burnquist; Darlan Romani, world champion in shot put, Tiago Splitter, NBA champion, Fernando Scherer, Olympic medalist and world champion in swimming, and Ana Moser, Olympic medalist in volleyball.

=== Football ===
The major football clubs of Santa Catarina are:

Criciuma EC from Criciúma. Criciúma EC, also known as "Tigre" (Tiger), was champion in the Copa do Brasil (Brazilian Cup) in 1991, the most important championship won by a Santa Catarina team in a very long time. Criciúma is the only team from Santa Catarina that played Libertadores of America Cup, in 1992, when it was 5th. Criciúma also won the Brazilian 2002 second series and 2006 C series. Criciuma is currently playing Campeonato Brasileiro Série A, the Brazilian national first division.

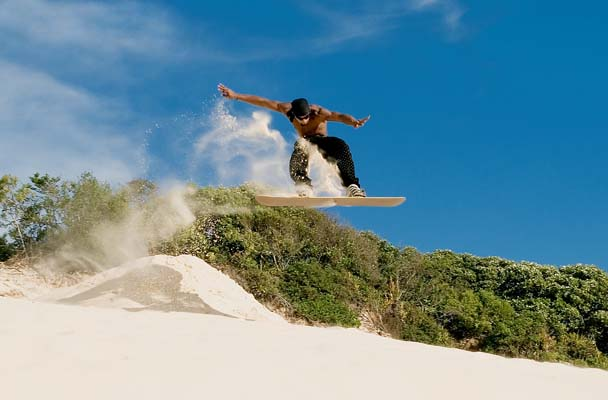
Sandboarder on Florianópolis dunes

Figueirense FC black and white from Florianópolis. Its nicknames are Figueira (Fig tree) and O Furacão do Estreito (The Hurricane of Estreito). Its stadium is the Orlando Scarpelli, located in the Estreito neighborhood in the mainland part of the city. Figueirense is currently playing in the Campeonato Brasileiro Série C, the third division of Brazilian football.

Avaí FC, blue and white from Florianópolis. It is also known as O Leão da Ilha (The Lion of the Island). Its stadium is the Aderbal Ramos da Silva, popularly known as Ressacada, located in the Carianos neighborhood, in the south part of the island. Avaí is currently playing in Campeonato Brasileiro Série B, the second division of Brazilian football.

Joinville Esporte Clube from Joinville. It is also known as "Tricolor" or "JEC". JEC won the Campeonato Brasileiro Série B, the second division of Brazilian football, in 2014 and was promoted to the Campeonato Brasileiro Série A, the first division, but currently plays in Campeonato Brasileiro Série C, the third division, after two consecutive relegations.

Associação Chapecoense de Futebol from Chapecó. Chapecoense is playing in the Campeonato Brasileiro Série A, the first and major division of Brazilian football. The club is currently recovering from the loss of virtually all of its first team in a 2016 plane crash.

=== Surfing ===
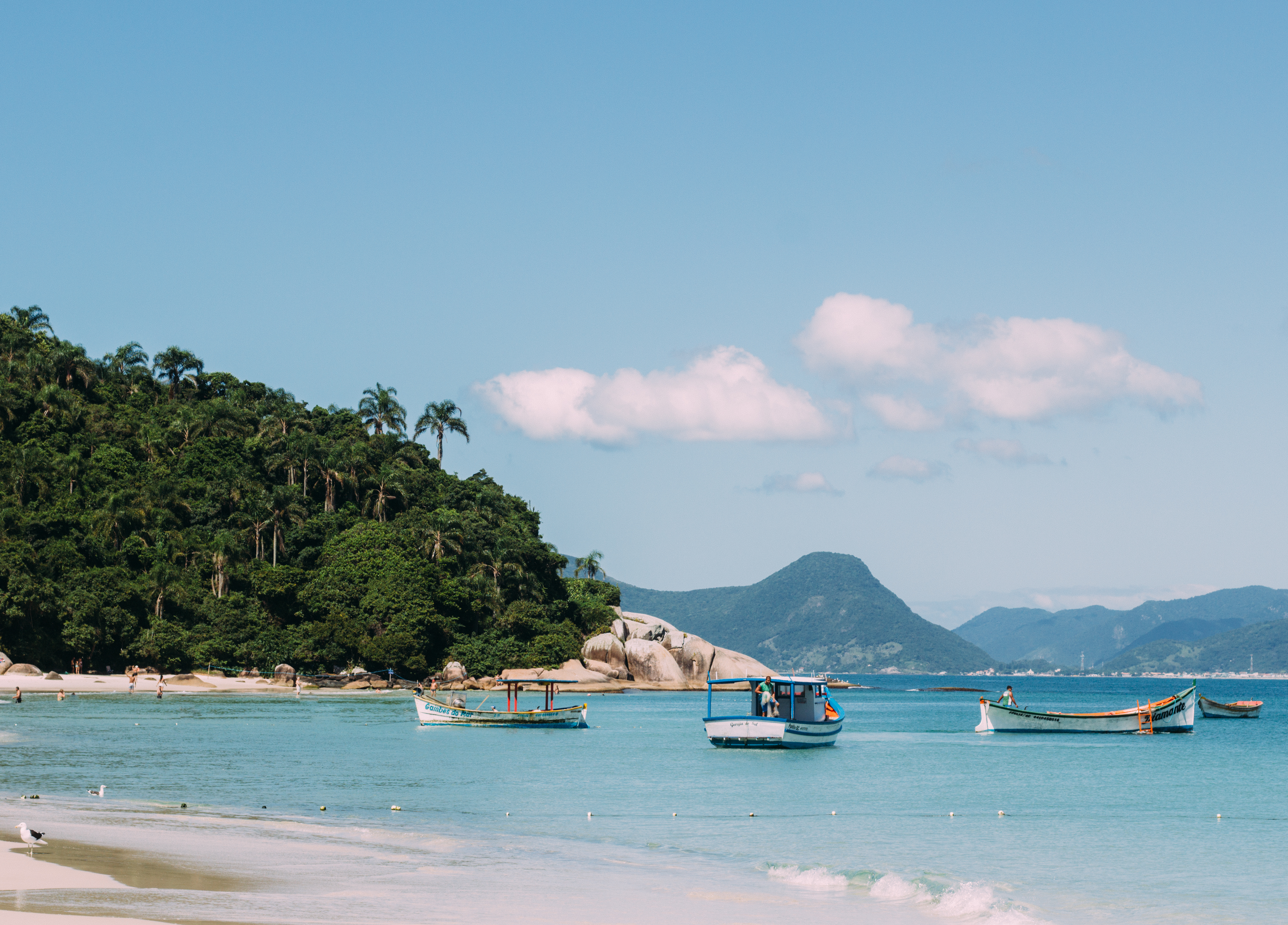
Campeche beach in Florianópolis

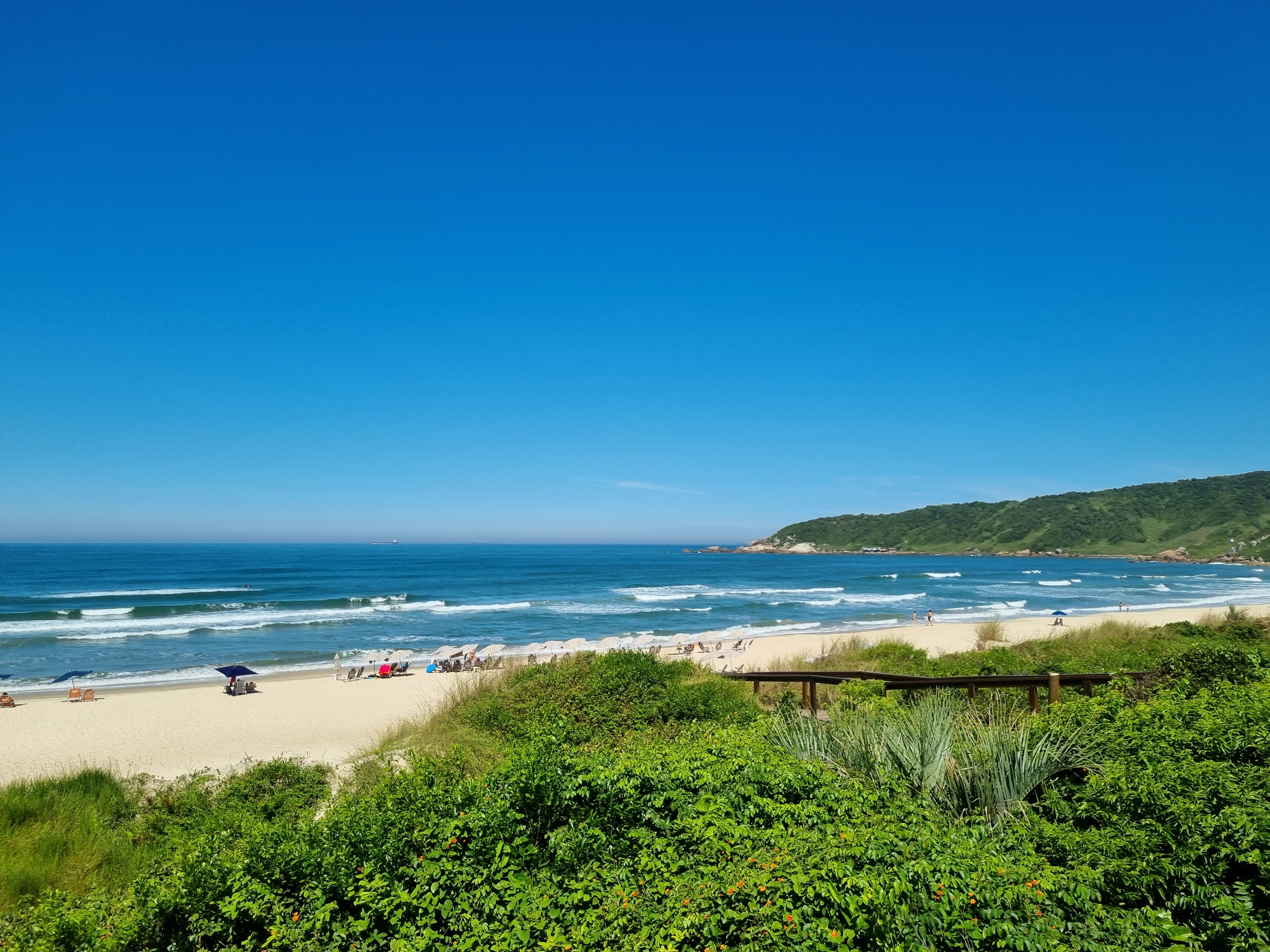
Praia do Rosa in Imbituba

Campeche Beach is generally considered to have the best and most consistent waves in Brazil, and in April of each year hosts what is currently South America's only ASP (Association of Surfing Professionals) World Championship Tour professional surfing competition. Brazil has played host to many ASP tour events over the past 30 years. Former contest sites include Rio de Janeiro, Barra de Tijuca, and Saquarema, but in past years have seen the tour set up shop in Florianópolis. Previously held towards the end of the tour, the past few years have seen several ASP world champions crowned in Brazil. In 2004 it was Andy Irons, and in 2005 it was Kelly Slater (who had his 2006 ASP World Title already stitched up by Brazil).

== See also ==
- Hino do Estado de Santa Catarina
- List of municipalities in Santa Catarina
- List of Santa Catarina state symbols

== Sources ==
- Arruda, Ana (1988). "Santa Catarina". Enciclopédia Delta Universal. Vol. 13. Rio de Janeiro: Delta.
- Bueno, Eduardo (1999). Capitães do Brasil: a saga dos primeiros colonizadores. Rio de Janeiro: Objetiva. ISBN 8573022523.
- Cintra, Jorge P. (July–December 2013). "Reconstruindo o Mapa das Capitanias Hereditárias" (PDF). Annals of the Paulista Museum. 21 (2). São Paulo: Universidade de São Paulo.
- Frias Filho, Otávio (1996). "Santa Catarina". Nova Enciclopédia Ilustrada Folha. Vol. 2. São Paulo: Folha da Manhã.
- Garschagen, Donaldson M. (2000). "Santa Catarina". Nova Enciclopédia Barsa. Vol. 13. São Paulo: Encyclopædia Britannica do Brasil Publicações Ltda.
- Houaiss, Antônio; et al. (1993). "Santa Catarina". Enciclopédia Mirador Internacional. Vol. 18. São Paulo: Encyclopædia Britannica do Brasil Publicações Ltda.
- Lago, Paulo Fernando (1971). Geografia de Santa Catarina: instrução programada (6th ed.). Florianópolis: Lago.
- Mascarenhas, Maria Amélia; et al. (1998). "Santa Catarina". Grande Enciclopédia Larousse Cultural. Vol. 21. São Paulo: Nova Cultural.
- Wachowicz, Ruy Christovam (1995). História do Paraná (7th ed.). Curitiba: Gráfica Vicentina.
- Wachowicz, Ruy Christovam (2010). História do Paraná (10th ed.). Curitiba: Editora UEPG.
- Wons, Iaroslaw (1994). Geografia do Paraná (6th ed.). Curitiba: Ensino Renovado.
