= Serra Geral =

Mountain range in Southern Brazil

Coordinates: 29°08′03″S 49°59′41″W

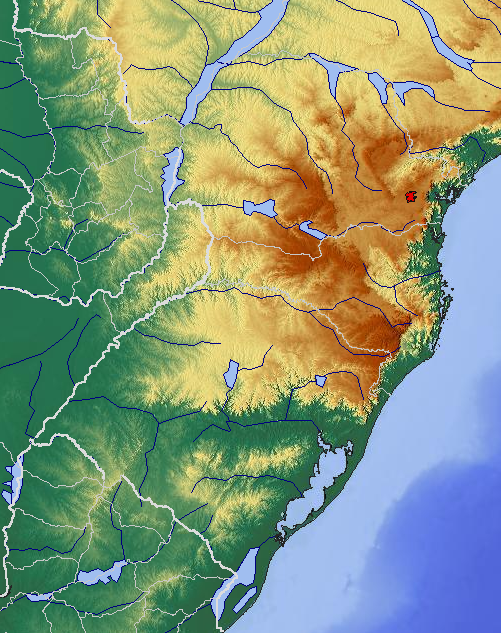
Physical Map of Southern Brazil

The Serra Geral (General Mountains) is a mountain range in southern Brazil, constituting the southern portion of the Serra do Mar system which runs along Brazil's southeastern coast. The Serra Geral runs parallel to the Atlantic coast in Santa Catarina and northern Rio Grande do Sul states, separating a narrow coastal plain from an interior plateau. The coastal plain is characterized by short rivers and frequent lagoons and bays, and lies within the humid tropical Serra do Mar coastal forests ecoregion.

The plateau to the west of the range is drained by tributaries of the Uruguay River, including the Pelotas and Canoas, and by the Jacuí River and its tributaries, which drains south into the Lagoa dos Patos of Rio Grande do Sul.

The Serra Geral is home to Aparados da Serra National Park and Serra Geral National Park, which are notable for their enormous canyons.

The plateau is the coldest part of Brazil, with frequent frosts and yearly snow, being home to the montane Araucaria moist forests. It is on Santa Catarina's portion of the Serra Geral where Brazil's coldest towns, Urubici, Urupema, São Joaquim and Bom Jardim da Serra, are located.

The mountains and plateau are mainly basalt, formed as part of the Paraná large igneous province which erupted in the early Cretaceous, and which has matching segments in Angola and Namibia in Africa.
