= Climate of Brazil =

Köppen climate types of Brazil

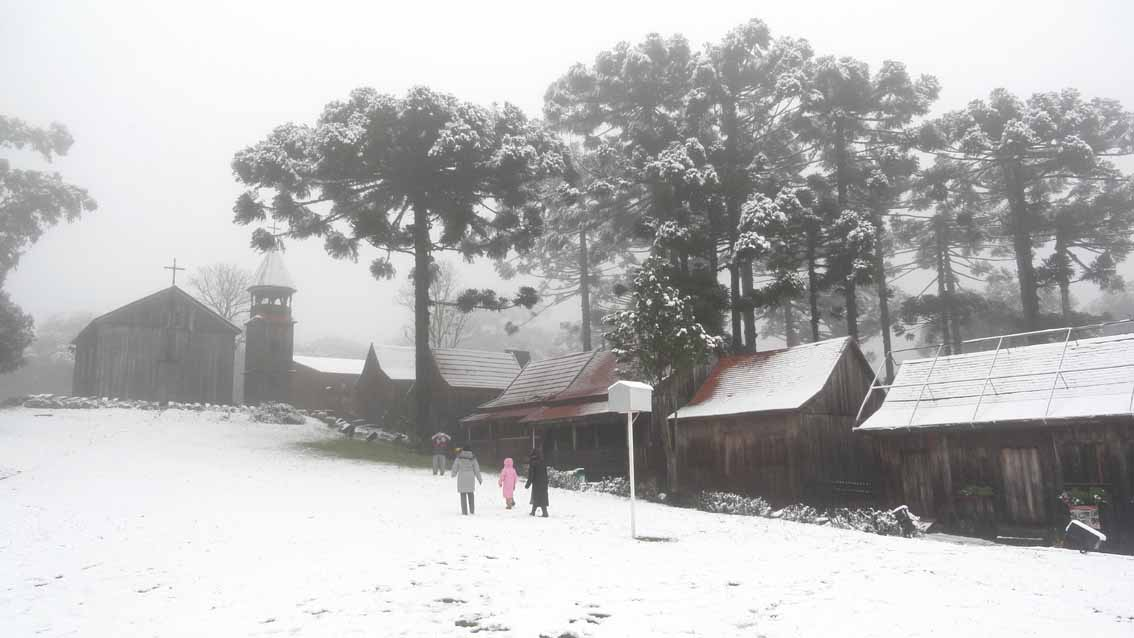
The temperate oceanic climate during winter, with snowfall in Caxias do Sul, South Region

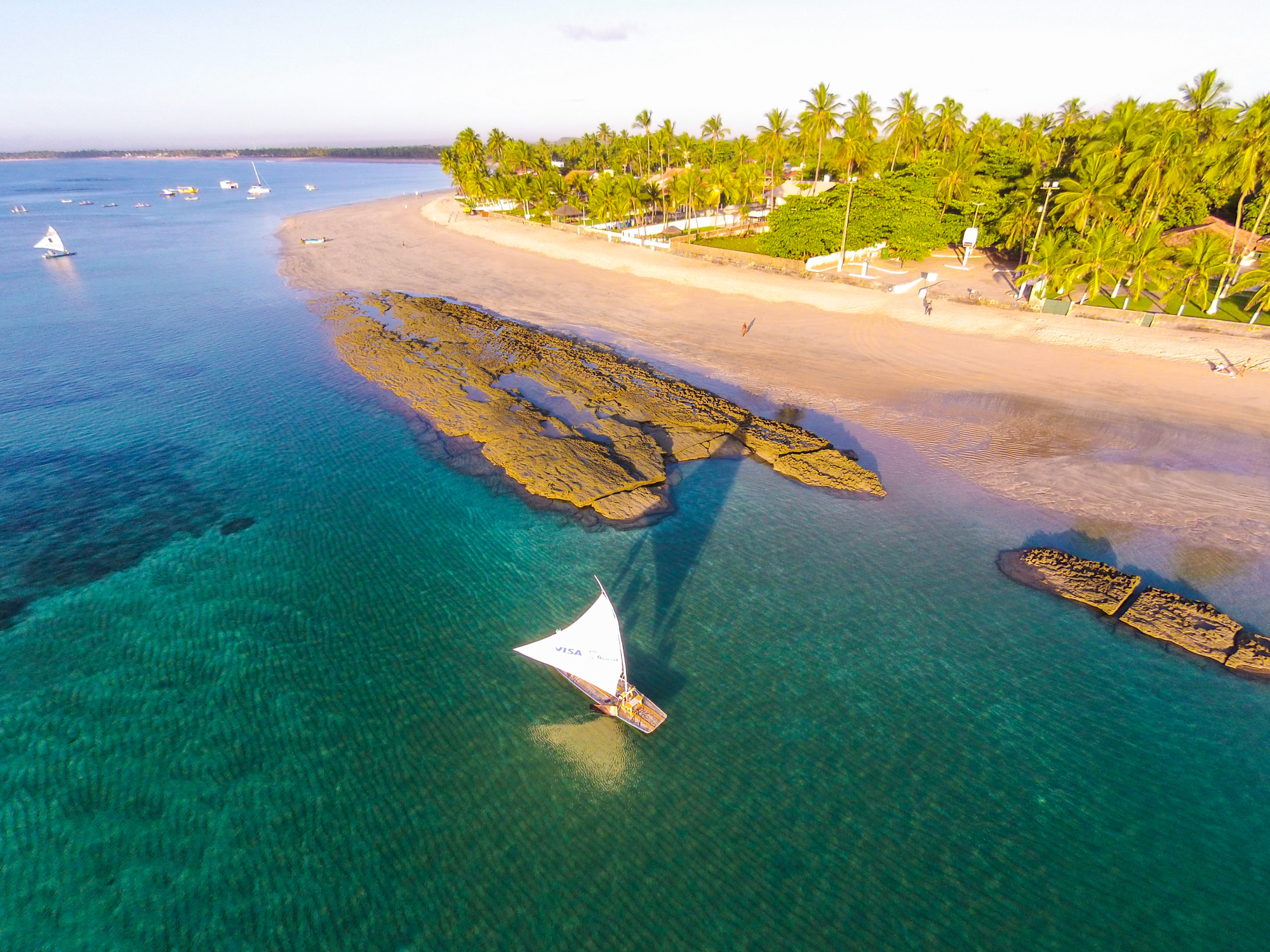
The tropical climate during summer, in Porto de Galinhas, Northeast region

The climate in Brazil varies considerably from mostly tropical north (the equator traverses the mouth of the Amazon) to temperate zones south of the Tropic of Capricorn (23°26' S latitude): the bulk of the country is the warm wet rainforest in the Amazon, but with dry zones in the North East, and temperate grasslands in the South. Like other tropical climates, much of Brazil experiences separate dry season and wet season. The Southern coast occasionally experiences South Atlantic tropical cyclones.

Historically Brazil has had ample access to water. However, with human development Brazil's climate has been subject to substantial change: deforestation in the Amazon is shifting climatic conditions, converting large zones from wet rainforest, into grassland that doesn't introduce as much moisture into the air as respiration from trees. This drying has significant consequences: amplifying extreme drought/flood cycles caused by global climate change in Brazil, reducing the ability of the rainforest to sequester carbon, and reducing water flow which subsequently reduces the reliability of rivers effecting agriculture and hydropower in Brazil. Loss of natural water cycles in the Brazilian Amazon is typically treated as one of the key tipping points in the global climate system.

== Temperatures ==
Temperatures north of the Tropic of Capricorn, especially in low-altitude areas, are high, averaging above 25 °C (77 °F), but the do not reach the summer extremes of up to 40 °C (104 °F) in the temperate zones. There is little seasonal variation near the equator, other than the frequency of rainfall. Average temperatures below the Tropic of Capricorn are mild, ranging from 13 °C (55 °F) to 22 °C (72 °F).

The highest temperature officially registered in Brazil was 44.8 °C (112.6 °F) in Araçuaí, Minas Gerais state, on 19 November 2023. The lowest temperature officially recorded in Brazil was −14 °C (7 °F) in Caçador, Santa Catarina state, on 11 June 1952. However, at the summit of Morro da Igreja, a mountain in the municipality of Urubici, also in Santa Catarina, a temperature of −17.8 °C (0.0 °F) was recorded unofficially on 30 June 1996. There are frosts south of the Tropic of Capricorn during the winter (June–September).

Although most of Brazil lies in the tropics, more than 60 percent of the country's population lives in areas that are cooled either by altitude, sea winds, or polar fronts. Some coastal cities, such as Rio de Janeiro, Recife, and Salvador, can get extremely hot, with temperatures exceeding 40 °C (104 °F) during heat waves. For example, Rio reached 43.2 °C (110 °F) on 26 December 2012. However, plateau cities such as Brasília and Belo Horizonte have mild to warm climates, and the southern cities of Porto Alegre and Curitiba experience cool winters. While Curitiba has a warm summer due to the average elevation of 934.6 metres (3,066 ft), Porto Alegre has a hot summer, with an average elevation of only 10 metres (33 ft).

Despite the popular image of the Amazon rainforest as a hot and humid region, temperatures of more than 35 °C (95 °F) are unusual. The annual average temperature in the region is between 22 to 26 °C (72 to 79 °F), with not much variation between the warmest and coldest months. Even so, on occasion, polar air masses influence the climate, causing the temperature to drop below 18 °C (64.4 °F). The rainforest town of Cruzeiro do Sul has recorded temperatures below 2.5 °C (36.5 °F) twice.

The hottest part of Brazil is the northeast, where temperatures of more than 38 °C (100 °F) are frequently recorded during the dry season between May and November. Along the Atlantic coast from Recife to Rio de Janeiro, average temperatures range from 23 to 27 °C (73 to 81 °F). Inland, on higher ground, temperatures are lower, ranging from 19 to 21 °C (66 to 70 °F). South of Rio, the seasons are more defined, and the range of temperatures significantly wider, with the annual average falling between 17 and 19 °C (63 and 66 °F). The cities of Belo Horizonte and Brasília have moderate temperatures, usually between 15 and 30 °C (59 and 86 °F), because of their elevation of 852 metres (2,795 ft) and 1,172 metres (3,845 ft) respectively. Rio de Janeiro, Recife, and Salvador on the coast have warm climates, with average temperatures of each month ranging from 23 to 27 °C (73 to 81 °F), but enjoy constant trade winds. The cities of São Paulo, Florianópolis and Porto Alegre are known to have a subtropical climate, which is within contrast with central and northern Brazil. Furthermore, it is to note that the winters often are more similar to that of Florida, and temperatures seldom fall below freezing in winter.

== Precipitation ==
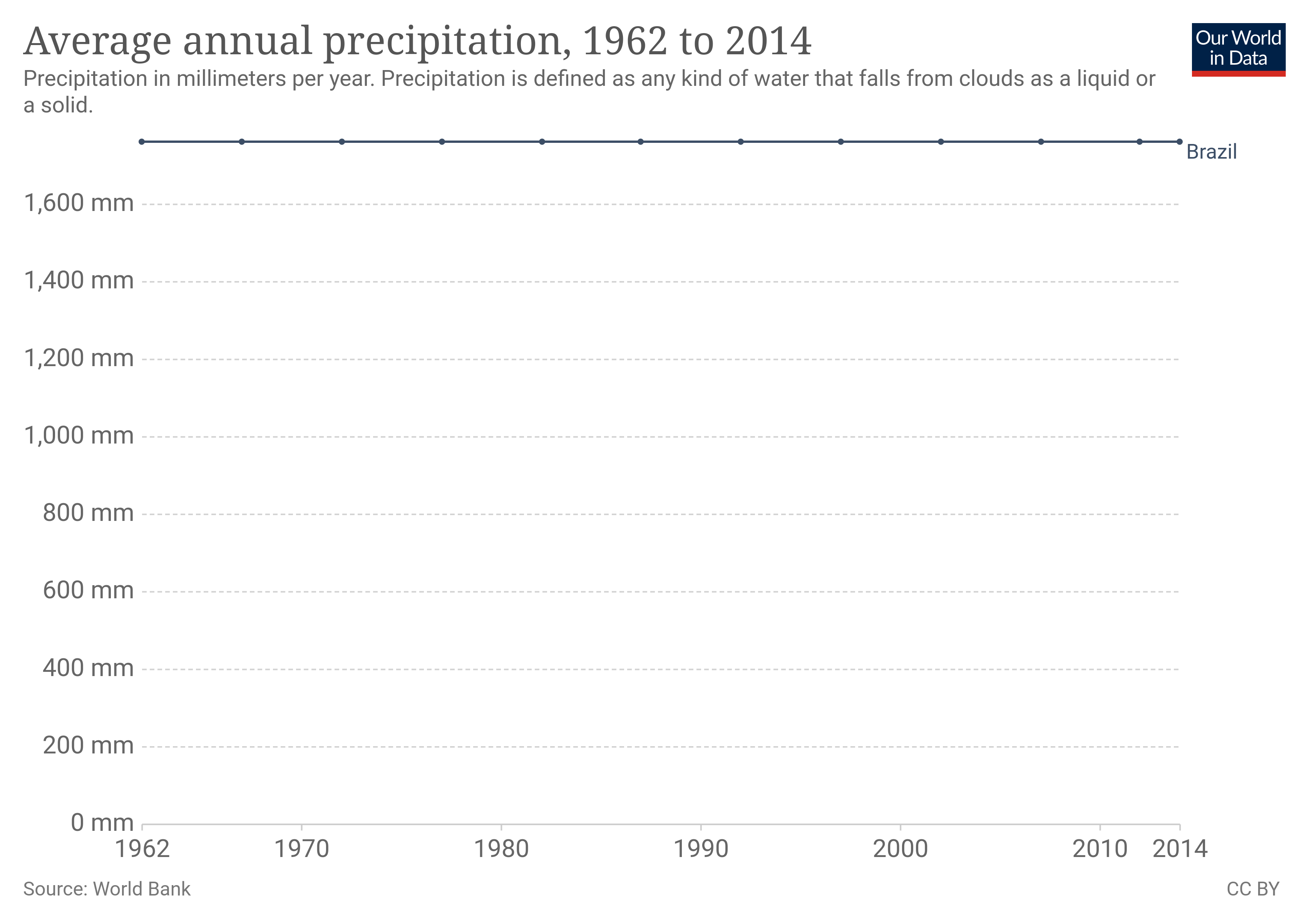
Average annual precipitation in Brazil, 1962–2014

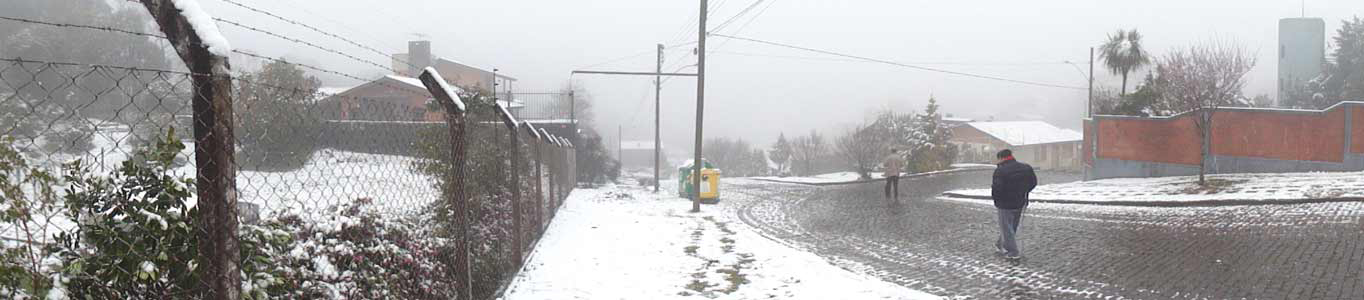
Snow in Caxias do Sul, Rio Grande do Sul in 2013

Precipitation levels vary widely throughout Brazil. Most of Brazil has moderate rainfall of between 1,000 and 1,500 mm (39 and 59 in) a year, with most of the rain falling in the summer (between December and April) south of the Equator. The Amazon region is notoriously humid, with rainfall generally more than 2,000 mm (79 in) per year and reaching as high as 3,000 mm (118 in) in parts of the western Amazon and near Belém. It is less widely known that, despite high annual precipitation, the Amazon forest has a three- to five-month dry season, the timing of which varies according to location north or south of the equator. For example, the dry season in Boa Vista is different to that of Manaus.

High and relatively regular levels of precipitation in the Amazon contrast sharply with the dryness of the semiarid Northeast, where rainfall is highly erratic and there are severe droughts in cycles averaging seven years. The Northeast is the driest part of the country, with erratic rainfall and crops struggling to grow. For example Quixeramobim receives only 560 mm of rain annually. The region also constitutes the hottest part of Brazil, where during the dry season between May and November, temperatures of more than 40 °C (104 °F) are common. However, the sertão, a region of semidesert vegetation used primarily for low-density ranching, turns green when there is rain. Most of the Center-West has 1,500 to 2,000 mm (59 to 79 in) of rain per year, with a pronounced dry season in the middle of the year. For example, Campo Grande has a dry season from June to September and a wet season for the rest of the year. In the wet season in cities like Campo Grande, flooding can be a problem because of intense rains that can happen in a short period. Flooding has also been a major issue in cities without a dry season such as Porto Alegre. The South and areas of the East are without a distinct dry season. Brazil has experienced deadly and devastating droughts in some years.

Brazil's most intense rain falls around the mouth of the Amazon near the city of Belém, and also in the upper regions of Amazonia where more than 2,000 millimetres (79 in) of rain fall every year. For example, Belém receives 3,084 millimetres (121.4 in) of rainfall annually. The warm weather lets many plants grow here. Most of Brazil has moderate rainfall of between 1,000 and 1,500 millimetres (39 and 59 in) a year, most of it coming between December and April.

=== Snowfall ===
Snow in Brazil often falls in winter in the mountains of Rio Grande do Sul, Santa Catarina, and Paraná, but it is rarer at lower elevations. It is possible, but very rare, in the states of São Paulo, Rio de Janeiro, Minas Gerais, and Mato Grosso do Sul. The greatest snowfall recorded in the country occurred in Vacaria on 7 August 1879, when more than 2 metres (79 inches) of snow accumulated on the ground. Other significant snowfalls where more than 1 metre (39 inches) of snow accumulated happened on 20 July 1957 in São Joaquim and 15 June 1985, in Pico das Agulhas Negras. São Joaquim has the most snowy days of any settlement in Brazil.

Snow has been recorded in Curitiba during several years, but has not accumulated significantly since 1975. In 2013, snow hit several municipalities, including Curitiba. Snow has also occurred in Porto Alegre, but is very rare.

== Extreme weather ==
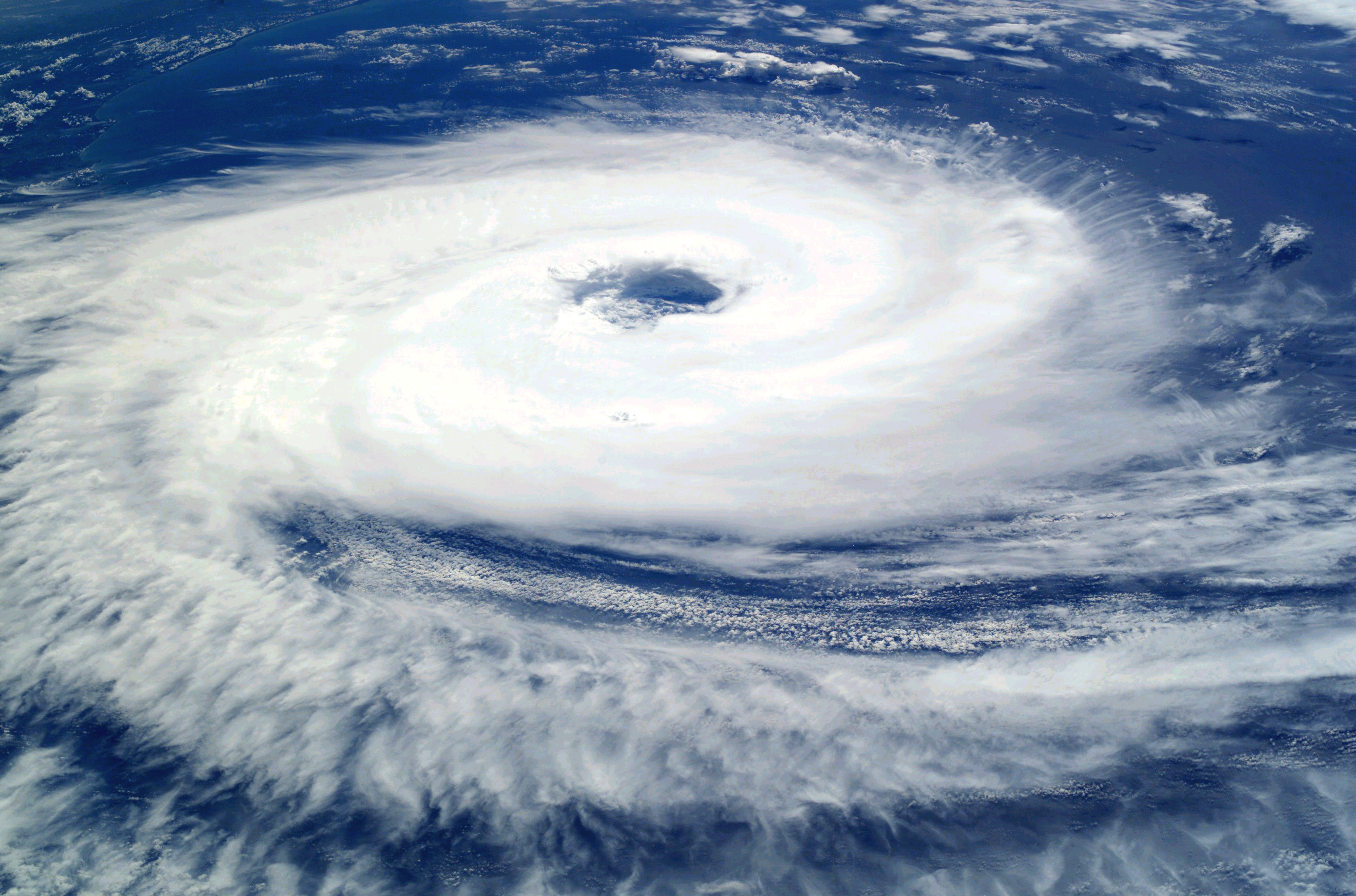
Hurricane Catarina on 26 March 2004

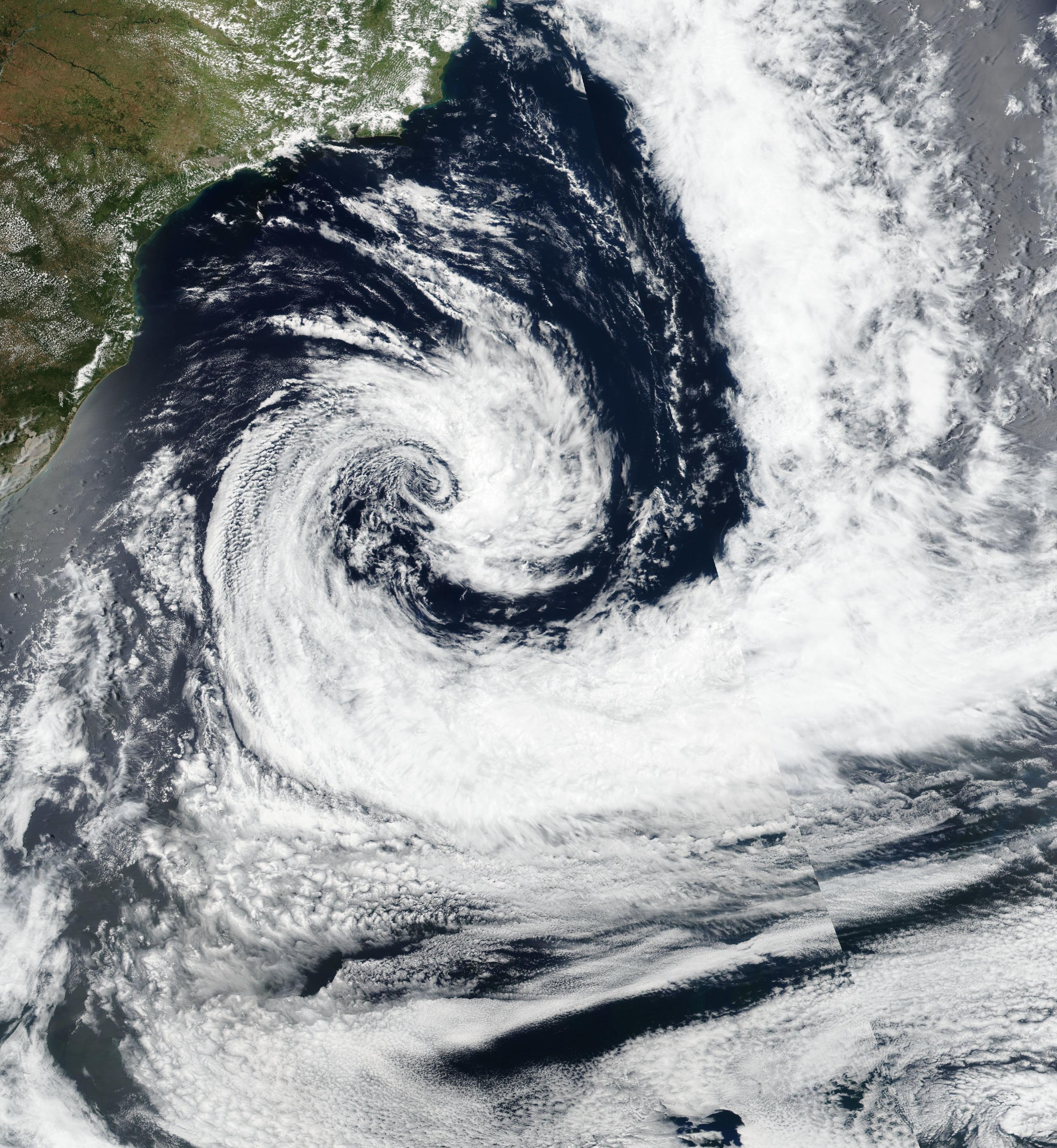
Subtropical Storm Ubá caused fifteen deaths

Because the South Atlantic basin is generally not a favorable environment for their development, Brazil has only rarely experienced tropical cyclones. The country's coastal population centers are considered less burdened with the need to prepare for cyclones, as are cities at similar latitudes in the United States and Asia. In 2011, the Brazilian Navy Hydrographic Center started assigning official names to tropical and subtropical cyclones that develop within its area of responsibility, which is to the west of 20°W, when they have gained sustained wind speeds of 65 kilometres per hour (40 mph) and over.

Hurricane Catarina is the first and only South Atlantic tropical cyclone to have reached hurricane strength, and impacted Santa Catarina as a Category 2 storm in 2004. It reached sustained wind speeds of 155 km/h (100 mph) and a pressure of 972 millibars. The hurricane damaged shipyards and several crop fields, and poorer people were affected the most. At least 2,000 people became homeless as a result of the storm.

Other weaker subtropical cyclones can also cause damage. In 2015, Subtropical Storm Cari caused flooding and landslides to some cities in Santa Catarina and Rio Grande do Sul. In 2020, the front associated with Subtropical Storm Kurumí played a role in damaging floods and mudslides, with heavy rainfall. Large amounts of rain fell in Greater Belo Horizonte, triggering a landslide which killed three people and left one person missing. Later that year, Subtropical Storm Mani affected the state of Espírito Santo, with landslides leaving over 400 people homeless. In 2021, Subtropical Storm Ubá killed fifteen people and caused flooding and damage. Over 30 municipalities in Bahia decreed a state of emergency because of the storm. In May 2022, Subtropical Storm Yakecan killed two people in Brazil and Uruguay. Because of severed power cables, over 220,000 people were affected by power cuts as a result of the storm.

== Climate change ==
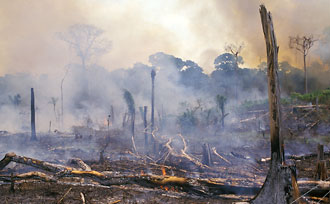
Forest fires are both a consequence and a cause of climate change.

Climate change in Brazil is causing higher temperatures and longer-lasting heatwaves, changing precipitation patterns, more intense wildfires and heightened fire risk. Brazil's hydropower, agriculture and urban water supplies will be affected. Brazil's rainforests, and the Amazon, are particularly at risk to climate change. At worst, large areas of the Amazon River basin could turn into savannah, with severe consequences for global climate and local livelihoods. Sea levels in Brazil are predicted to rise by more than 20 cm (0.66 ft) by the middle of the century. Extreme weather events like droughts, flash floods, and urban flooding are causing annual losses of around R$13 billion (US$2.6 billion), equivalent to 0.1% of the country’s 2022 GDP. Climate impacts could exacerbate poverty.

Brazil's greenhouse gas emissions per person are higher than the global average, and Brazil is among the top 10 highest emitting countries. Greenhouse gas emissions by Brazil are over 4% of the annual world total, firstly due to cutting down trees in the Amazon rainforest, which emitted more carbon dioxide in the 2010s than it absorbed, and secondly from large cattle farms, where cows belch methane.

In the Paris Agreement, Brazil promised to reduce its emissions, but the 2019-2022 Bolsonaro government has been criticized for doing too little to limit or adapt to climate change. In 2024 Brazil revised its Nationally Determined Contribution (NDC), setting a goal to cut emissions by 59% to 67% compared to 2005 levels by 2035.

== Examples ==
Climate data for São Paulo (Mirante de Santana, 1991–2020, extremes 1887–present)
| Month | Jan | Feb | Mar | Apr | May | Jun | Jul | Aug | Sep | Oct | Nov | Dec | Year |
|---|---|---|---|---|---|---|---|---|---|---|---|---|---|
| Record high °C (°F) | 37.0 (98.6) | 35.9 (96.6) | 34.3 (93.7) | 33.4 (92.1) | 31.7 (89.1) | 28.8 (83.8) | 30.2 (86.4) | 33.0 (91.4) | 35.7 (96.3) | 35.9 (96.6) | 35.3 (95.5) | 35.6 (96.1) | 37.0 (98.6) |
| Mean daily maximum °C (°F) | 28.6 (83.5) | 29.0 (84.2) | 28.0 (82.4) | 26.6 (79.9) | 23.4 (74.1) | 22.9 (73.2) | 22.9 (73.2) | 24.5 (76.1) | 25.2 (77.4) | 26.5 (79.7) | 26.9 (80.4) | 28.3 (82.9) | 26.1 (79.0) |
| Daily mean °C (°F) | 23.1 (73.6) | 23.5 (74.3) | 22.5 (72.5) | 21.2 (70.2) | 18.4 (65.1) | 17.5 (63.5) | 17.2 (63.0) | 18.1 (64.6) | 19.1 (66.4) | 20.5 (68.9) | 21.2 (70.2) | 22.6 (72.7) | 20.4 (68.7) |
| Mean daily minimum °C (°F) | 19.4 (66.9) | 19.6 (67.3) | 18.9 (66.0) | 17.5 (63.5) | 14.7 (58.5) | 13.5 (56.3) | 12.8 (55.0) | 13.3 (55.9) | 14.9 (58.8) | 16.5 (61.7) | 17.3 (63.1) | 18.7 (65.7) | 16.4 (61.5) |
| Record low °C (°F) | 6.5 (43.7) | 12.4 (54.3) | 12.0 (53.6) | 6.8 (44.2) | 3.7 (38.7) | 1.2 (34.2) | 0.8 (33.4) | 3.4 (38.1) | 3.5 (38.3) | 7.0 (44.6) | 7.0 (44.6) | 10.3 (50.5) | 0.8 (33.4) |
| Average precipitation mm (inches) | 292.1 (11.50) | 257.7 (10.15) | 229.1 (9.02) | 87.0 (3.43) | 66.3 (2.61) | 59.7 (2.35) | 48.4 (1.91) | 32.3 (1.27) | 83.3 (3.28) | 127.2 (5.01) | 143.9 (5.67) | 231.3 (9.11) | 1,658.3 (65.29) |
| Average precipitation days (≥ 1.0 mm) | 17 | 14 | 13 | 6 | 6 | 5 | 4 | 4 | 7 | 10 | 11 | 13 | 110 |
| Average relative humidity (%) | 76.9 | 75.0 | 76.6 | 74.6 | 75.0 | 73.5 | 70.8 | 68.2 | 71.3 | 73.7 | 73.7 | 73.9 | 73.6 |
| Mean monthly sunshine hours | 139.1 | 153.5 | 161.6 | 169.3 | 167.6 | 160.0 | 169.0 | 173.1 | 144.5 | 157.9 | 152.8 | 145.1 | 1,893.5 |
Source 1: Instituto Nacional de Meteorologia (sun 1981–2010)
Source 2: Meteo Climat (record highs and lows)

Climate data for Rio de Janeiro (Saúde station, 1961—1990)
| Month | Jan | Feb | Mar | Apr | May | Jun | Jul | Aug | Sep | Oct | Nov | Dec | Year |
|---|---|---|---|---|---|---|---|---|---|---|---|---|---|
| Record high °C (°F) | 40.9 (105.6) | 41.8 (107.2) | 41.0 (105.8) | 39.3 (102.7) | 36.3 (97.3) | 35.9 (96.6) | 34.9 (94.8) | 38.9 (102.0) | 40.6 (105.1) | 42.8 (109.0) | 40.5 (104.9) | 43.2 (109.8) | 43.2 (109.8) |
| Mean daily maximum °C (°F) | 30.2 (86.4) | 30.2 (86.4) | 29.4 (84.9) | 27.8 (82.0) | 26.4 (79.5) | 25.2 (77.4) | 25.0 (77.0) | 25.5 (77.9) | 25.4 (77.7) | 26.0 (78.8) | 27.4 (81.3) | 28.6 (83.5) | 27.3 (81.1) |
| Daily mean °C (°F) | 26.3 (79.3) | 26.6 (79.9) | 26.0 (78.8) | 24.4 (75.9) | 22.8 (73.0) | 21.8 (71.2) | 21.3 (70.3) | 21.8 (71.2) | 22.2 (72.0) | 22.9 (73.2) | 24.0 (75.2) | 25.3 (77.5) | 23.8 (74.8) |
| Mean daily minimum °C (°F) | 23.3 (73.9) | 23.5 (74.3) | 23.3 (73.9) | 21.9 (71.4) | 20.4 (68.7) | 18.7 (65.7) | 18.4 (65.1) | 18.9 (66.0) | 19.2 (66.6) | 20.2 (68.4) | 21.4 (70.5) | 22.4 (72.3) | 21.0 (69.8) |
| Record low °C (°F) | 17.7 (63.9) | 18.9 (66.0) | 18.6 (65.5) | 16.2 (61.2) | 11.1 (52.0) | 11.6 (52.9) | 12.2 (54.0) | 10.6 (51.1) | 10.2 (50.4) | 10.1 (50.2) | 15.1 (59.2) | 17.1 (62.8) | 10.1 (50.2) |
| Average rainfall mm (inches) | 137.1 (5.40) | 130.4 (5.13) | 135.8 (5.35) | 94.9 (3.74) | 69.8 (2.75) | 42.7 (1.68) | 41.9 (1.65) | 44.5 (1.75) | 53.6 (2.11) | 86.5 (3.41) | 97.8 (3.85) | 134.2 (5.28) | 1,069.4 (42.10) |
| Average rainy days (≥ 1 mm) | 11 | 7 | 8 | 9 | 6 | 6 | 4 | 5 | 7 | 9 | 10 | 11 | 93 |
| Average relative humidity (%) | 79 | 79 | 80 | 80 | 80 | 79 | 77 | 77 | 79 | 80 | 79 | 80 | 79.1 |
| Mean monthly sunshine hours | 211.9 | 201.3 | 206.4 | 181.0 | 186.3 | 175.1 | 188.6 | 184.8 | 146.2 | 152.1 | 168.5 | 179.6 | 2,181.8 |
Source: Brazilian National Institute of Meteorology (INMET).

Climate data for Brasília (1991–2020, extremes 1961–present)
| Month | Jan | Feb | Mar | Apr | May | Jun | Jul | Aug | Sep | Oct | Nov | Dec | Year |
|---|---|---|---|---|---|---|---|---|---|---|---|---|---|
| Record high °C (°F) | 32.6 (90.7) | 32.0 (89.6) | 32.1 (89.8) | 31.6 (88.9) | 31.6 (88.9) | 31.6 (88.9) | 30.8 (87.4) | 33.0 (91.4) | 35.7 (96.3) | 36.4 (97.5) | 34.5 (94.1) | 33.7 (92.7) | 36.4 (97.5) |
| Mean daily maximum °C (°F) | 26.9 (80.4) | 27.2 (81.0) | 27.0 (80.6) | 26.8 (80.2) | 26.0 (78.8) | 25.3 (77.5) | 25.6 (78.1) | 27.4 (81.3) | 29.1 (84.4) | 29.0 (84.2) | 27.0 (80.6) | 26.8 (80.2) | 27.0 (80.6) |
| Daily mean °C (°F) | 21.9 (71.4) | 21.9 (71.4) | 21.8 (71.2) | 21.6 (70.9) | 20.3 (68.5) | 19.3 (66.7) | 19.3 (66.7) | 21.0 (69.8) | 22.8 (73.0) | 23.1 (73.6) | 21.7 (71.1) | 21.7 (71.1) | 21.4 (70.5) |
| Mean daily minimum °C (°F) | 18.3 (64.9) | 18.2 (64.8) | 18.2 (64.8) | 17.7 (63.9) | 15.6 (60.1) | 14.2 (57.6) | 13.9 (57.0) | 15.3 (59.5) | 17.6 (63.7) | 18.5 (65.3) | 18.1 (64.6) | 18.3 (64.9) | 17.0 (62.6) |
| Record low °C (°F) | 12.2 (54.0) | 11.0 (51.8) | 14.5 (58.1) | 10.7 (51.3) | 3.2 (37.8) | 3.3 (37.9) | 1.6 (34.9) | 5.0 (41.0) | 9.0 (48.2) | 10.2 (50.4) | 11.4 (52.5) | 11.4 (52.5) | 1.6 (34.9) |
| Average precipitation mm (inches) | 206.0 (8.11) | 179.5 (7.07) | 226.0 (8.90) | 145.2 (5.72) | 26.9 (1.06) | 3.3 (0.13) | 1.5 (0.06) | 16.3 (0.64) | 38.1 (1.50) | 141.8 (5.58) | 253.1 (9.96) | 241.1 (9.49) | 1,478.8 (58.22) |
| Average precipitation days (≥ 1.0 mm) | 16 | 14 | 15 | 9 | 3 | 1 | 0 | 2 | 4 | 10 | 17 | 18 | 109 |
| Average relative humidity (%) | 74.7 | 74.2 | 76.1 | 72.2 | 65.4 | 58.8 | 51.0 | 43.5 | 46.4 | 58.8 | 74.5 | 76.0 | 64.3 |
| Mean monthly sunshine hours | 159.6 | 158.9 | 168.7 | 200.8 | 237.9 | 247.6 | 268.3 | 273.5 | 225.7 | 191.3 | 138.3 | 145.0 | 2,415.6 |
Source 1: Instituto Nacional de Meteorologia
Source 2: Meteo Climat (record highs and lows)

Climate data for Manaus (1981–2010, extremes 1872–present)
| Month | Jan | Feb | Mar | Apr | May | Jun | Jul | Aug | Sep | Oct | Nov | Dec | Year |
|---|---|---|---|---|---|---|---|---|---|---|---|---|---|
| Record high °C (°F) | 37.0 (98.6) | 37.8 (100.0) | 36.2 (97.2) | 35.4 (95.7) | 34.7 (94.5) | 34.9 (94.8) | 35.7 (96.3) | 37.6 (99.7) | 38.3 (100.9) | 38.1 (100.6) | 38.2 (100.8) | 37.3 (99.1) | 38.3 (100.9) |
| Mean daily maximum °C (°F) | 30.9 (87.6) | 30.8 (87.4) | 30.9 (87.6) | 31.0 (87.8) | 31.1 (88.0) | 31.4 (88.5) | 32.1 (89.8) | 33.1 (91.6) | 33.5 (92.3) | 33.4 (92.1) | 32.6 (90.7) | 31.7 (89.1) | 31.9 (89.4) |
| Daily mean °C (°F) | 26.3 (79.3) | 26.3 (79.3) | 26.3 (79.3) | 26.4 (79.5) | 26.6 (79.9) | 26.7 (80.1) | 27.0 (80.6) | 27.6 (81.7) | 28.0 (82.4) | 28.0 (82.4) | 27.6 (81.7) | 26.9 (80.4) | 27.0 (80.6) |
| Mean daily minimum °C (°F) | 23.1 (73.6) | 23.1 (73.6) | 23.2 (73.8) | 23.2 (73.8) | 23.4 (74.1) | 23.0 (73.4) | 23.1 (73.6) | 23.4 (74.1) | 23.7 (74.7) | 23.9 (75.0) | 23.7 (74.7) | 23.5 (74.3) | 23.4 (74.1) |
| Record low °C (°F) | 18.5 (65.3) | 18.0 (64.4) | 19.0 (66.2) | 18.5 (65.3) | 14.3 (57.7) | 17.0 (62.6) | 12.1 (53.8) | 18.0 (64.4) | 20.0 (68.0) | 19.4 (66.9) | 18.3 (64.9) | 19.0 (66.2) | 12.1 (53.8) |
| Average precipitation mm (inches) | 287.0 (11.30) | 295.1 (11.62) | 300.0 (11.81) | 319.0 (12.56) | 246.9 (9.72) | 118.3 (4.66) | 75.4 (2.97) | 64.3 (2.53) | 76.3 (3.00) | 104.1 (4.10) | 169.2 (6.66) | 245.6 (9.67) | 2,301.2 (90.60) |
| Average precipitation days (≥ 1.0 mm) | 19 | 18 | 19 | 18 | 16 | 11 | 7 | 7 | 6 | 8 | 11 | 15 | 155 |
| Average relative humidity (%) | 86.4 | 86.0 | 86.9 | 86.8 | 85.6 | 83.1 | 80.2 | 78.4 | 77.2 | 78.1 | 80.7 | 84.2 | 82.8 |
| Mean monthly sunshine hours | 112.7 | 93.4 | 95.8 | 107.3 | 144.2 | 186.8 | 218.5 | 215.7 | 183.8 | 158.1 | 140.0 | 118.5 | 1,774.8 |
Source 1: Brazilian National Institute of Meteorology (INMET) (climatological normals from 1981-2010; (temperature extremes: 1961-present).
Source 2: Meteo Climat (record highs and lows)

Climate data for Fortaleza (1991–2020 normals, extremes 1849–present)
| Month | Jan | Feb | Mar | Apr | May | Jun | Jul | Aug | Sep | Oct | Nov | Dec | Year |
|---|---|---|---|---|---|---|---|---|---|---|---|---|---|
| Record high °C (°F) | 37.7 (99.9) | 34.0 (93.2) | 33.8 (92.8) | 34.0 (93.2) | 33.2 (91.8) | 33.8 (92.8) | 33.8 (92.8) | 36.7 (98.1) | 39.6 (103.3) | 33.8 (92.8) | 34.3 (93.7) | 37.0 (98.6) | 39.6 (103.3) |
| Mean daily maximum °C (°F) | 31.2 (88.2) | 31.1 (88.0) | 30.8 (87.4) | 30.6 (87.1) | 30.8 (87.4) | 30.5 (86.9) | 30.6 (87.1) | 31.1 (88.0) | 31.4 (88.5) | 31.6 (88.9) | 31.7 (89.1) | 31.7 (89.1) | 31.1 (88.0) |
| Daily mean °C (°F) | 27.4 (81.3) | 27.3 (81.1) | 27.0 (80.6) | 26.8 (80.2) | 26.8 (80.2) | 26.4 (79.5) | 26.2 (79.2) | 26.6 (79.9) | 27.0 (80.6) | 27.4 (81.3) | 27.7 (81.9) | 27.8 (82.0) | 27.0 (80.6) |
| Mean daily minimum °C (°F) | 24.5 (76.1) | 24.3 (75.7) | 23.9 (75.0) | 23.8 (74.8) | 23.8 (74.8) | 23.2 (73.8) | 22.8 (73.0) | 22.9 (73.2) | 23.6 (74.5) | 24.3 (75.7) | 24.7 (76.5) | 24.9 (76.8) | 23.9 (75.0) |
| Record low °C (°F) | 20.0 (68.0) | 21.2 (70.2) | 20.2 (68.4) | 20.0 (68.0) | 20.6 (69.1) | 20.2 (68.4) | 19.4 (66.9) | 19.4 (66.9) | 20.5 (68.9) | 21.0 (69.8) | 21.3 (70.3) | 21.0 (69.8) | 19.4 (66.9) |
| Average precipitation mm (inches) | 156.4 (6.16) | 187.0 (7.36) | 336.9 (13.26) | 385.0 (15.16) | 229.0 (9.02) | 130.0 (5.12) | 69.7 (2.74) | 20.0 (0.79) | 13.6 (0.54) | 9.5 (0.37) | 9.8 (0.39) | 37.1 (1.46) | 1,584 (62.36) |
| Average precipitation days (≥ 1.0 mm) | 13 | 14 | 20 | 21 | 16 | 10 | 7 | 3 | 3 | 3 | 3 | 5 | 118 |
| Average relative humidity (%) | 78.4 | 80.4 | 83.0 | 85.1 | 82.6 | 79.9 | 76.9 | 73.3 | 71.7 | 72.0 | 72.7 | 74.4 | 77.5 |
| Mean monthly sunshine hours | 220.4 | 183.0 | 172.7 | 152.8 | 211.9 | 219.2 | 254.2 | 288.5 | 287.1 | 294.2 | 287.7 | 274.2 | 2,845.9 |
Source 1: Instituto Nacional de Meteorologia
Source 2: Meteo Climat (record highs and lows)

Climate data for Belo Horizonte (1991–2020, extremes 1949–present)
| Month | Jan | Feb | Mar | Apr | May | Jun | Jul | Aug | Sep | Oct | Nov | Dec | Year |
|---|---|---|---|---|---|---|---|---|---|---|---|---|---|
| Record high °C (°F) | 35.4 (95.7) | 35.2 (95.4) | 33.5 (92.3) | 32.7 (90.9) | 31.4 (88.5) | 30.5 (86.9) | 30.8 (87.4) | 33.8 (92.8) | 36.1 (97.0) | 38.4 (101.1) | 34.7 (94.5) | 34.8 (94.6) | 38.4 (101.1) |
| Mean daily maximum °C (°F) | 28.7 (83.7) | 29.1 (84.4) | 28.4 (83.1) | 27.6 (81.7) | 25.7 (78.3) | 24.9 (76.8) | 24.9 (76.8) | 26.3 (79.3) | 27.9 (82.2) | 28.7 (83.7) | 27.7 (81.9) | 28.2 (82.8) | 27.3 (81.1) |
| Daily mean °C (°F) | 23.7 (74.7) | 24.0 (75.2) | 23.5 (74.3) | 22.6 (72.7) | 20.6 (69.1) | 19.6 (67.3) | 19.4 (66.9) | 20.5 (68.9) | 22.0 (71.6) | 23.0 (73.4) | 22.7 (72.9) | 23.3 (73.9) | 22.1 (71.8) |
| Mean daily minimum °C (°F) | 20.0 (68.0) | 20.2 (68.4) | 19.8 (67.6) | 18.8 (65.8) | 16.6 (61.9) | 15.4 (59.7) | 15.2 (59.4) | 15.8 (60.4) | 17.4 (63.3) | 18.8 (65.8) | 18.9 (66.0) | 19.5 (67.1) | 18.0 (64.4) |
| Record low °C (°F) | 10.4 (50.7) | 12.8 (55.0) | 11.7 (53.1) | 8.8 (47.8) | 7.5 (45.5) | 3.1 (37.6) | 5.4 (41.7) | 7.2 (45.0) | 9.8 (49.6) | 11.4 (52.5) | 9.1 (48.4) | 13.5 (56.3) | 3.1 (37.6) |
| Average precipitation mm (inches) | 330.9 (13.03) | 177.7 (7.00) | 197.5 (7.78) | 82.3 (3.24) | 28.1 (1.11) | 11.4 (0.45) | 5.4 (0.21) | 10.6 (0.42) | 49.2 (1.94) | 110.1 (4.33) | 236.0 (9.29) | 339.1 (13.35) | 1,578.3 (62.14) |
| Average precipitation days (≥ 1.0 mm) | 15 | 10 | 11 | 7 | 3 | 1 | 1 | 1 | 4 | 8 | 14 | 17 | 92 |
| Average relative humidity (%) | 69.3 | 66.2 | 68.6 | 66.3 | 64.3 | 62.6 | 58.4 | 54.0 | 55.3 | 59.9 | 68.5 | 71.0 | 63.7 |
| Mean monthly sunshine hours | 182.6 | 190.8 | 190.0 | 201.5 | 215.4 | 223.8 | 236.6 | 244.8 | 211.2 | 204.4 | 164.7 | 162.0 | 2,427.8 |
Source 1: Instituto Nacional de Meteorologia
Source 2: Meteo Climat (record highs and lows)

Climate data for Curitiba (Elevation: 923.5 m, 1981–2010 normals, extremes 1885–present)
| Month | Jan | Feb | Mar | Apr | May | Jun | Jul | Aug | Sep | Oct | Nov | Dec | Year |
|---|---|---|---|---|---|---|---|---|---|---|---|---|---|
| Record high °C (°F) | 34.3 (93.7) | 34.8 (94.6) | 33.9 (93.0) | 32.6 (90.7) | 29.4 (84.9) | 28.2 (82.8) | 28.2 (82.8) | 31.6 (88.9) | 33.7 (92.7) | 35.5 (95.9) | 35.2 (95.4) | 33.6 (92.5) | 35.5 (95.9) |
| Mean daily maximum °C (°F) | 26.8 (80.2) | 26.8 (80.2) | 26.0 (78.8) | 24.0 (75.2) | 20.8 (69.4) | 20.1 (68.2) | 19.7 (67.5) | 21.5 (70.7) | 21.4 (70.5) | 23.1 (73.6) | 25.0 (77.0) | 26.2 (79.2) | 23.5 (74.3) |
| Daily mean °C (°F) | 20.9 (69.6) | 21.0 (69.8) | 20.1 (68.2) | 18.3 (64.9) | 15.1 (59.2) | 13.9 (57.0) | 13.5 (56.3) | 14.6 (58.3) | 15.3 (59.5) | 17.1 (62.8) | 18.9 (66.0) | 20.2 (68.4) | 17.4 (63.3) |
| Mean daily minimum °C (°F) | 17.2 (63.0) | 17.4 (63.3) | 16.5 (61.7) | 14.6 (58.3) | 11.2 (52.2) | 9.7 (49.5) | 9.0 (48.2) | 9.6 (49.3) | 11.1 (52.0) | 13.2 (55.8) | 14.9 (58.8) | 16.2 (61.2) | 13.4 (56.1) |
| Record low °C (°F) | 8.2 (46.8) | 6.8 (44.2) | 3.9 (39.0) | −4.0 (24.8) | −2.3 (27.9) | −4.0 (24.8) | −5.2 (22.6) | −5.2 (22.6) | −5.4 (22.3) | −1.5 (29.3) | −0.9 (30.4) | −1.3 (29.7) | −5.4 (22.3) |
| Average precipitation mm (inches) | 218.3 (8.59) | 166.2 (6.54) | 147.0 (5.79) | 95.7 (3.77) | 113.5 (4.47) | 94.1 (3.70) | 108.3 (4.26) | 74.0 (2.91) | 141.4 (5.57) | 138.7 (5.46) | 124.4 (4.90) | 154.2 (6.07) | 1,575.8 (62.04) |
| Average precipitation days (≥ 1.0 mm) | 15 | 13 | 11 | 8 | 8 | 7 | 7 | 6 | 9 | 11 | 10 | 12 | 117 |
| Average relative humidity (%) | 81.2 | 81.3 | 82.2 | 82.5 | 83.4 | 82.3 | 80.4 | 77.1 | 80.8 | 81.7 | 79.2 | 79.6 | 81.0 |
| Mean monthly sunshine hours | 160.5 | 151.3 | 163.1 | 155.5 | 148.8 | 141.3 | 162.1 | 173.0 | 124.3 | 136.7 | 163.5 | 164.7 | 1,844.8 |
| Average ultraviolet index | 12 | 12 | 12 | 9 | 6 | 5 | 5 | 7 | 9 | 11 | 12 | 12 | 9 |
Source: INMET, Meteo Climat (record highs and lows) and Weather Atlas (UV index)

Climate data for Porto Alegre (1981–2010, extremes 1949–present)
| Month | Jan | Feb | Mar | Apr | May | Jun | Jul | Aug | Sep | Oct | Nov | Dec | Year |
|---|---|---|---|---|---|---|---|---|---|---|---|---|---|
| Record high °C (°F) | 39.2 (102.6) | 39.0 (102.2) | 38.1 (100.6) | 36.0 (96.8) | 32.7 (90.9) | 31.6 (88.9) | 32.2 (90.0) | 34.9 (94.8) | 38.0 (100.4) | 38.2 (100.8) | 39.0 (102.2) | 40.3 (104.5) | 40.3 (104.5) |
| Mean daily maximum °C (°F) | 30.5 (86.9) | 30.2 (86.4) | 29.1 (84.4) | 25.9 (78.6) | 22.2 (72.0) | 19.8 (67.6) | 19.3 (66.7) | 21.3 (70.3) | 22.1 (71.8) | 25.0 (77.0) | 27.4 (81.3) | 29.5 (85.1) | 25.2 (77.4) |
| Daily mean °C (°F) | 24.7 (76.5) | 24.5 (76.1) | 23.5 (74.3) | 20.3 (68.5) | 16.9 (62.4) | 14.4 (57.9) | 13.8 (56.8) | 15.3 (59.5) | 16.7 (62.1) | 19.4 (66.9) | 21.5 (70.7) | 23.6 (74.5) | 19.6 (67.3) |
| Mean daily minimum °C (°F) | 20.6 (69.1) | 20.5 (68.9) | 19.5 (67.1) | 16.5 (61.7) | 13.3 (55.9) | 10.8 (51.4) | 10.1 (50.2) | 11.1 (52.0) | 12.8 (55.0) | 15.3 (59.5) | 17.1 (62.8) | 19.0 (66.2) | 15.6 (60.1) |
| Record low °C (°F) | 10.1 (50.2) | 11.9 (53.4) | 9.6 (49.3) | 4.5 (40.1) | 2.3 (36.1) | −1.9 (28.6) | −1.1 (30.0) | −1.2 (29.8) | 2.2 (36.0) | 4.9 (40.8) | 6.7 (44.1) | 10.0 (50.0) | −1.9 (28.6) |
| Average precipitation mm (inches) | 110.1 (4.33) | 106.5 (4.19) | 92.2 (3.63) | 107.3 (4.22) | 118.8 (4.68) | 141.3 (5.56) | 141.3 (5.56) | 117.4 (4.62) | 141.5 (5.57) | 138.3 (5.44) | 110.9 (4.37) | 99.6 (3.92) | 1,425.2 (56.11) |
| Average precipitation days (≥ 1.0 mm) | 9 | 9 | 8 | 9 | 9 | 9 | 9 | 9 | 10 | 10 | 8 | 8 | 107 |
| Average relative humidity (%) | 72.9 | 74.8 | 75.3 | 77.6 | 81.0 | 82.7 | 80.7 | 77.8 | 77.0 | 75.0 | 72.1 | 70.9 | 76.5 |
| Mean monthly sunshine hours | 227.2 | 195.2 | 202.4 | 166.0 | 146.9 | 115.6 | 131.4 | 145.3 | 145.8 | 178.0 | 215.2 | 232.4 | 2,101.4 |
Source: Instituto Nacional de Meteorologia

== See also ==
- Effects of global warming
- Climate change in Brazil
- Geography of Brazil
- Regional effects of global warming
