= Climate of South Brazil =

Climate types of South Region.

The climate of South Brazil, which is located below the Tropic of Capricorn in a temperate zone, is influenced by the system of disturbed circulation of the South, which produces the rains, mainly in the summer. It is also influenced by the system of disturbed circulation of the West, that brings rains and storms, sometimes hail, producing winds with bursts of 60 to 90 km/h (37.3 to 55.9 mph). Regarding temperatures: the winter is cool and the summer is hot. The annual medium temperatures range from 14 to 22 °C (57.2 to 71.6 °F), and in places with altitudes above 1,100 m (3,609 ft), drops to approximately 10 °C (50 °F). Some parts of the southern region also have an oceanic climate.

In the summer, mainly in January, in the valleys of the rivers Paranapanema, Paraná and Ibicuí-Jacuí, the medium temperature is in excess of 24 °C (75.2 °F), and the medium temperature of the river Uruguay surpasses 26 °C (78.8 °F). The average maximum temperature stays around 24 to 27 °C (75.2 to 80.6 °F) on the elevated surfaces of the plateau and, in the lowest areas, between 30 and 32 °C (86.0 and 89.6 °F).

In the winter, mainly in July, the medium temperature stays relatively low, oscillating between 10 and 15 °C (50 and 59 °F), except for the valleys of the rivers Paranapanema and Paraná, besides the coast of Paraná and Santa Catarina, where the averages are approximately 15 to 18 °C (59.0 to 64.4 °F). The average maximum temperature is also low, around 20 to 24 °C (68.0 to 75.2 °F), in the big valleys and in the coast, and 16 to 20 °C (60.8 to 68.0 °F) in the plateau region. The average minimum temperature varies from 6 to 12 °C (42.8 to 53.6 °F) , and the thermometer frequently registers temperatures near 0 °C or below, accompanied by frost and snow, in consequence of the invasion of polar masses.

The annual medium pluviosity oscillates from 1,250 to 2,000 mm (49.2 to 78.7 in), except along the coast of Paraná and west of Santa Catarina, where the values are in excess of 2,000 mm (78.7 in), and in the north of Paraná and in a small coastal area of Santa Catarina, which have lower recordings down to 1,250 mm (49.2 in). The maximum pluviometric indexes occur in the winter and the minimum in the summer throughout almost the whole area.

== Charts of selected cities ==
Porto Alegre

Climate chart (precipitation, max. and min. temperature)
J	F	M	A	M	J	J	A	S	O	N	D
99 30 20	109 30 21	104 28 19	86 25 16	94 22 13	132 19 10	122 19 10	140 20 11	140 22 13	114 24 15	104 27 17	102 29 19
- █ Average max. and min. temperatures in °C
- █ Precipitation totals in mm
Imperial conversion
J	F	M	A	M	J	J	A	S	O	N	D
3.9 86 68	4.3 86 70	4.1 82 66	3.4 77 61	3.7 72 55	5.2 66 50	4.8 66 50	5.5 68 52	5.5 72 55	4.5 75 59	4.1 81 63	4 84 66
- █ Average max. and min. temperatures in °F
- █ Precipitation totals in inches

Florianópolis

Climate chart (precipitation, max. and min. temperature)
J	F	M	A	M	J	J	A	S	O	N	D
175 28 21	198 28 22	185 27 21	97 25 18	97 23 16	76 21 13	94 20 12	91 21 14	127 21 15	127 23 17	130 24 18	147 26 20
- █ Average max. and min. temperatures in °C
- █ Precipitation totals in mm
Imperial conversion
J	F	M	A	M	J	J	A	S	O	N	D
6.9 82 70	7.8 82 72	7.3 81 70	3.8 77 64	3.8 73 61	3 70 55	3.7 68 54	3.6 70 57	5 70 59	5 73 63	5.1 75 64	5.8 79 68
- █ Average max. and min. temperatures in °F
- █ Precipitation totals in inches

Curitiba

Climate chart (precipitation, max. and min. temperature)
J	F	M	A	M	J	J	A	S	O	N	D
165 26 16	142 26 16	127 24 15	89 22 13	99 21 10	99 18 8	89 19 8	74 21 9	114 21 11	135 22 12	124 24 14	150 25 15
- █ Average max. and min. temperatures in °C
- █ Precipitation totals in mm
Imperial conversion
J	F	M	A	M	J	J	A	S	O	N	D
6.5 79 61	5.6 79 61	5 75 59	3.5 72 55	3.9 70 50	3.9 64 46	3.5 66 46	2.9 70 48	4.5 70 52	5.3 72 54	4.9 75 57	5.9 77 59
- █ Average max. and min. temperatures in °F
- █ Precipitation totals in inches

São Joaquim

Climate chart (precipitation, max. and min. temperature)
J	F	M	A	M	J	J	A	S	O	N	D
168 23 13	160 23 13	132 22 12	107 18 9	112 16 7	119 14 6	140 14 6	170 16 6	170 17 7	152 19 8	135 21 10	130 22 12
- █ Average max. and min. temperatures in °C
- █ Precipitation totals in mm
Imperial conversion
J	F	M	A	M	J	J	A	S	O	N	D
6.6 73 55	6.3 73 55	5.2 72 54	4.2 64 48	4.4 61 45	4.7 57 43	5.5 57 43	6.7 61 43	6.7 63 45	6 66 46	5.3 70 50	5.1 72 54
- █ Average max. and min. temperatures in °F
- █ Precipitation totals in inches

Caxias do Sul

Climate chart (precipitation, max. and min. temperature)
J	F	M	A	M	J	J	A	S	O	N	D
145 26 17	152 26 17	206 24 16	132 22 12	109 19 11	152 17 8	155 17 8	178 18 9	203 19 10	173 21 12	140 23 13	170 26 15
- █ Average max. and min. temperatures in °C
- █ Precipitation totals in mm
Imperial conversion
J	F	M	A	M	J	J	A	S	O	N	D
5.7 79 63	6 79 63	8.1 75 61	5.2 72 54	4.3 66 52	6 63 46	6.1 63 46	7 64 48	8 66 50	6.8 70 54	5.5 73 55	6.7 79 59
- █ Average max. and min. temperatures in °F
- █ Precipitation totals in inches
