= Snow in Brazil =

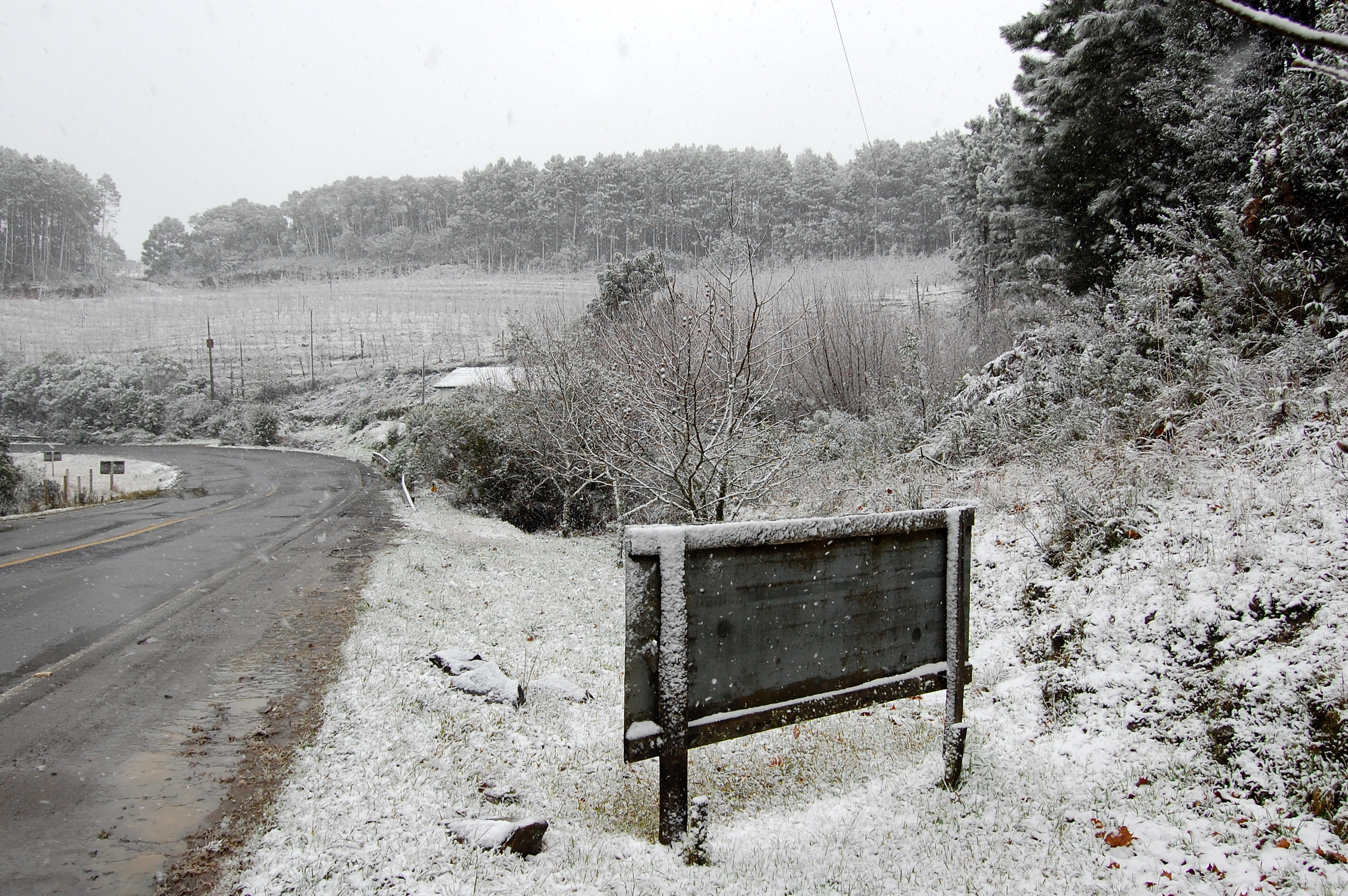
Snow in São Joaquim, Santa Catarina (August 2010)

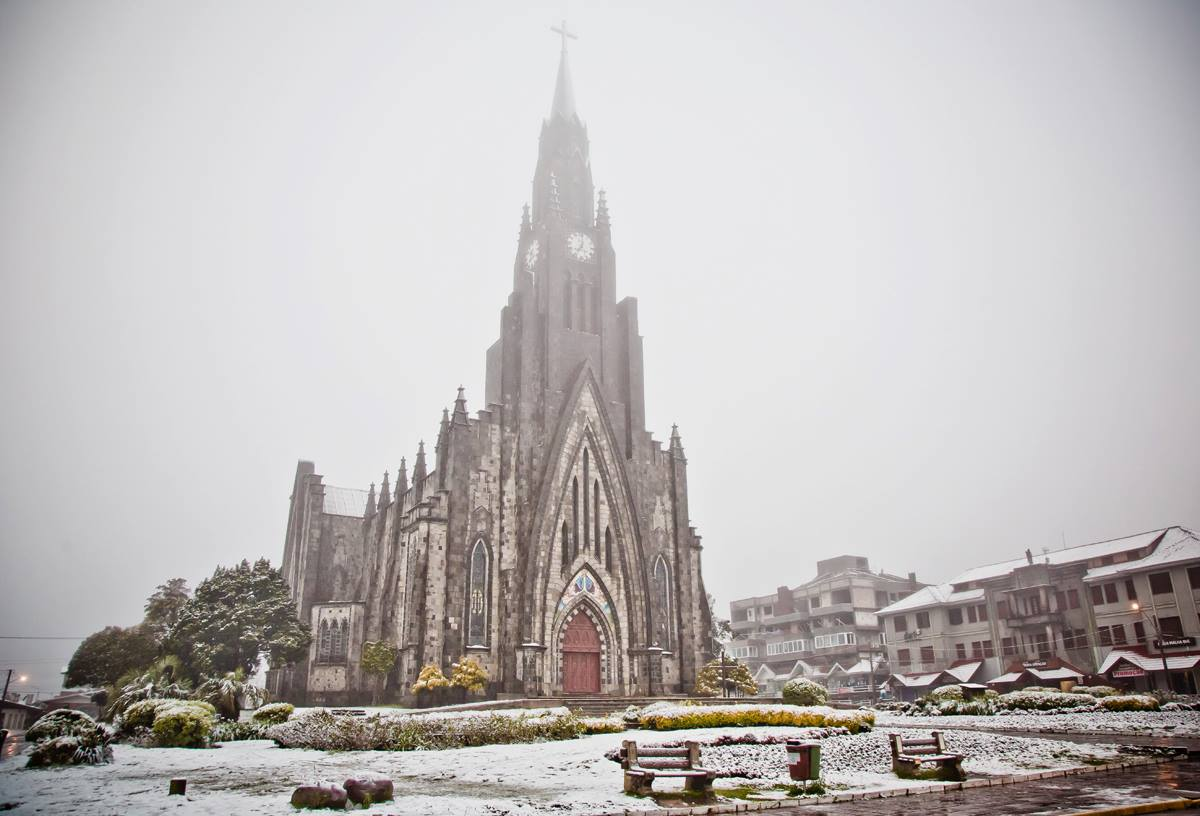
Snow in Canela, Rio Grande do Sul (August 2013)

Snow in Brazil occurs yearly in the high plains of the country's South Region (comprising the states of Rio Grande do Sul, Santa Catarina, and Paraná). Elsewhere in the country it is a rare phenomenon but has been registered several times.

The phenomenon occurs mainly during the months of June, July and August. In this period, São Joaquim, the city with the most snow days, receives an average of 13,000 visitors from other parts of Brazil.

The greatest snowfall ever recorded in the country occurred in Vacaria (RS) on 7 August 1879, with more than 2 metres (79 inches) of accumulated snow. Snowfalls like this are extremely rare in Brazil, the two below being the only later snowfalls that reached (or passed) 1 metre (39 inches):

- 20 July 1957, in São Joaquim, Santa Catarina, with 1.3 metres (51 inches) of snow. Often cited as the greatest snowfall in Brazil.
- 15 June 1985, in Pico das Agulhas Negras, Itatiaia, Rio de Janeiro. 1 metre (39 inches) of snow.

== By region ==
=== South ===
Due to the high latitude and large areas of high altitude, the South Region is easily the coldest in Brazil, with snow tending to occur every year in southern municipalities like São Joaquim (SC), Urubici (SC), Urupema (SC), and São José dos Ausentes (RS), as well as Bom Jesus (RS), Bom Jardim da Serra (SC), Cambará do Sul (RS), and Palmas (PR). Those are considered the coldest cities in the country.

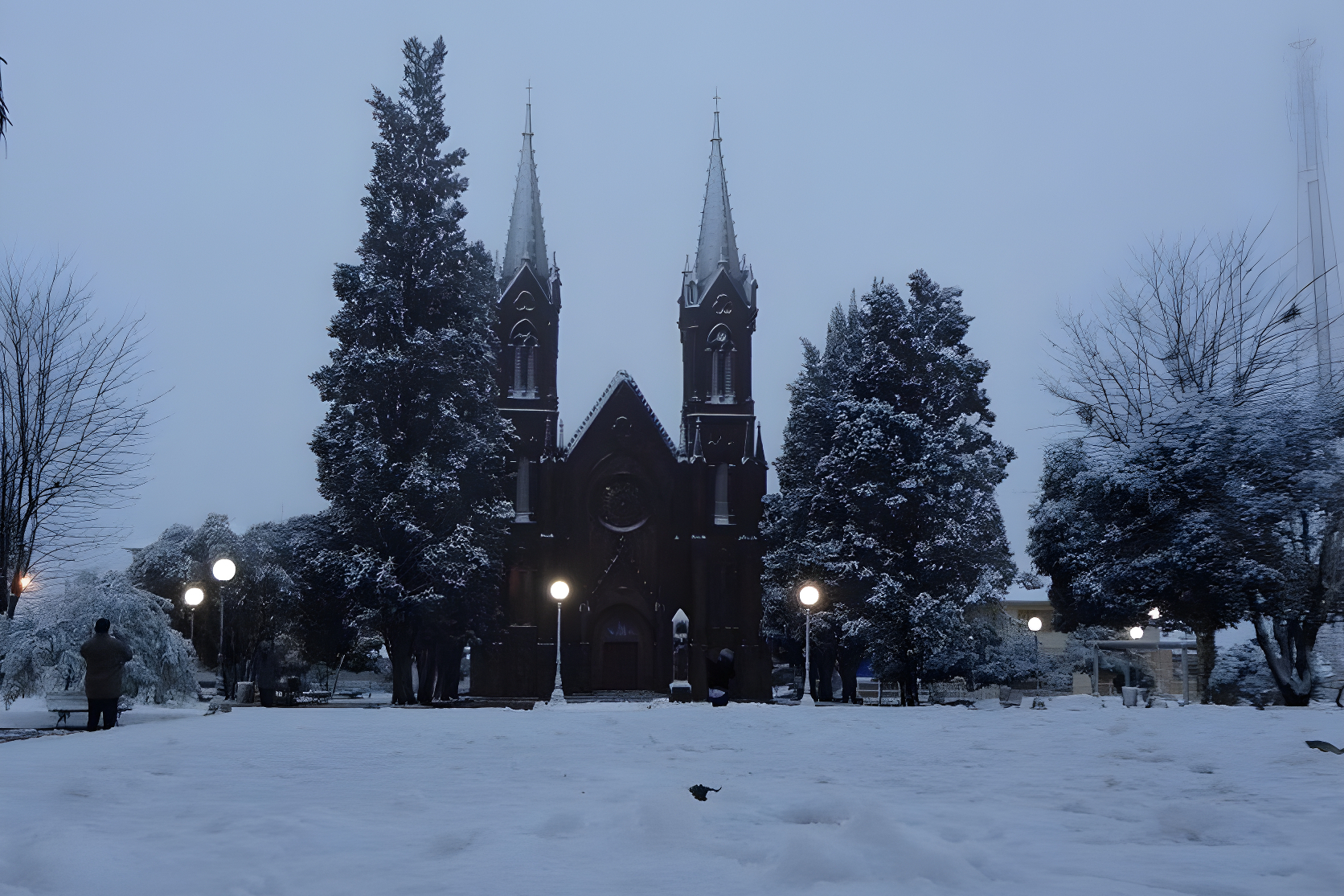
Snow in Vacaria, Rio Grande do Sul (2020)

Although the snow is normally restricted to higher elevation, there are also many reports of snow at low elevation such as Ijuí and Porto Alegre (330 metres (1,080 feet) and 10 metres (33 feet) above sea level, respectively).

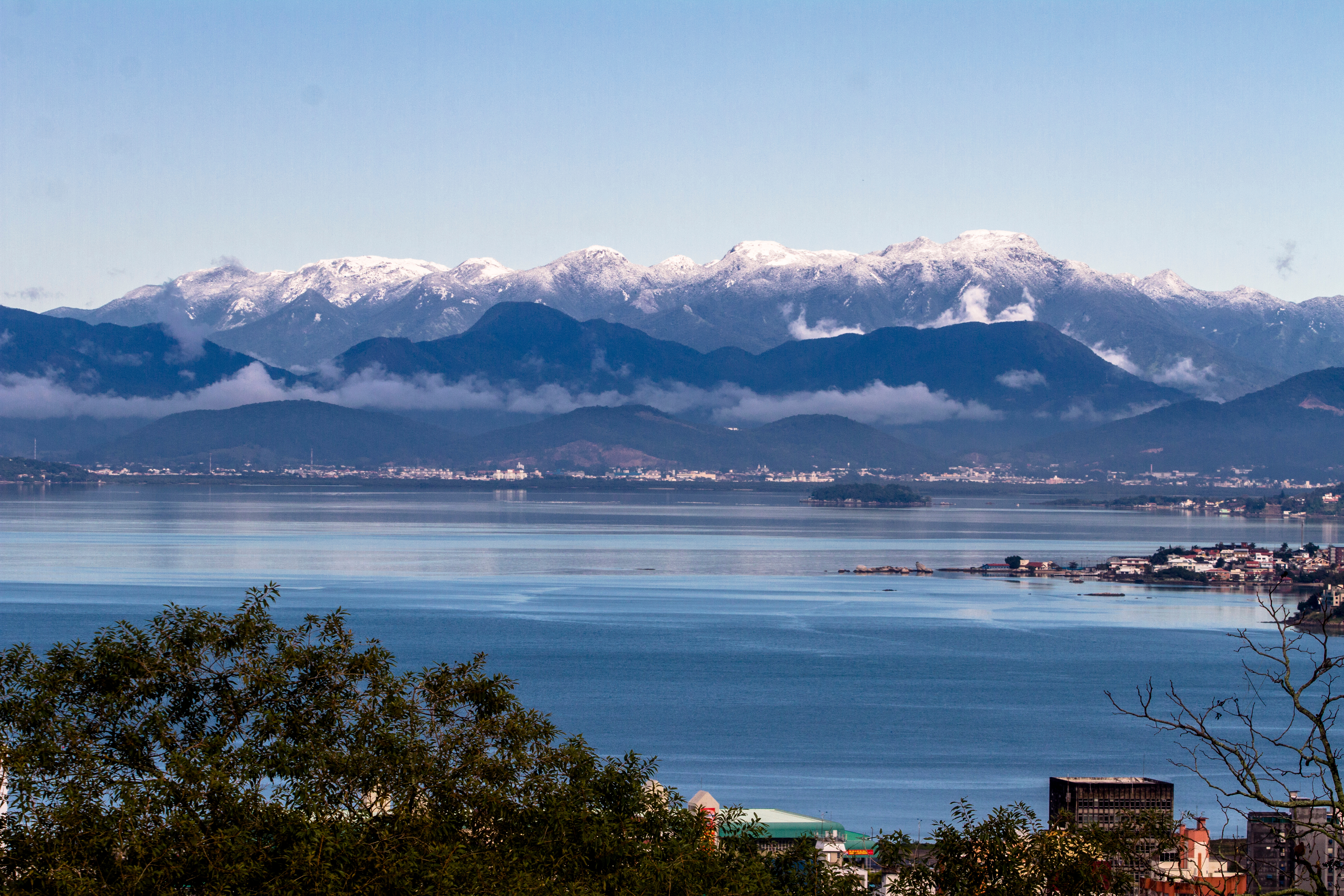
Snow in mountains near Florianópolis, Santa Catarina (July 2013)

In 2000, snow occurred in more than 70 municipalities spread throughout the three states of the Southern Region. In 2010, snow was recorded in 21 municipalities of the Santa Catarina and Rio Grande mountains. In the year 2013, a historic episode in July brought snow to more than 140 cities in the region, including the country's coldest capital Curitiba (PR), which experienced snowfall once more after the last occurrence 38 years before and is home of 1.8 million inhabitants.

=== Other regions ===
Snow has been registered in the southeastern states of São Paulo (last time in Apiaí in 1975), Rio de Janeiro (last time at Itatiaia, at the Pico das Agulhas Negras, in 1985), and Minas Gerais. It has also been registered twice (1975 and 2013) in Paranhos, Mato Grosso do Sul, located in the Center-West. This totals seven states with snow reported in the country.

The remaining states, including the whole regions of North and Northeast, have strong tropical and semi-arid climates and low latitude and altitude, making snow (virtually) impossible. There have been no reports of snow even at the highest point in the country, Pico da Neblina.

== See also ==
- São Joaquim - the Brazilian city with the most snowy days
- Urupema - lowest average temperatures for any Brazilian city
- Climate of Brazil
- Morro da Igreja
- Lapse rate - the rate of decrease of temperature with altitude
