= Urupema =

Coordinates: 27.9528°S 49.8731°W

- Municipality
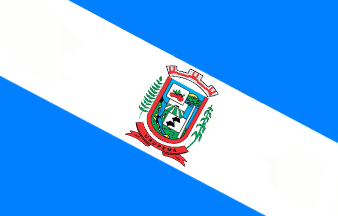
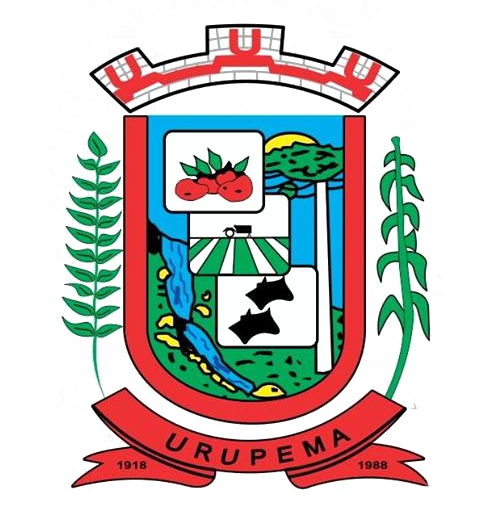
- Flag Coat of arms

- Country: Brazil
- Region: South
- State: Santa Catarina
- Mesoregion: Serrana
- Established: 9 January 1988

Government
  - Mayor: Evandro Frigo Pereira (PP)

Area
  - Total: 353 km^{2} (136 sq mi)
- Elevation: 1,335 m (4,380 ft)

Population (2022)
  - Total: 2,656
  - Density: 7.52/km^{2} (19.5/sq mi)
- Time zone: UTC -3
- Website: https://urupema.sc.gov.br/

Urupema is a municipality in the state of Santa Catarina in the South region of Brazil. It has an area of approximately 353 km², a population of 2,656 inhabitants as of 2022 and a GDP per capita of R$ 36,058 as of 2021. It is often cited as the coldest city in Brazil.

== Early history ==
The name Urupema (with variations including urupemba, arupemba, gurupema and jurupema) refers to a sieve made of vegetal fiber and used domestically to sieve cornmeal and cassava flour and in fishing.

The city's first inhabitants were attracted by the abundance of resources provided by the local Paraná pines, a coniferous tree which, at the time, was the main source of food for native populations during fall and winter. Unlike Amerindians in North America who used the fur of bisons and moose, the natives of Brazil did not have any similar large animals available.

Urupema became a municipality on 4 January 1988. Its patron saint is Saint Anne.

== Climate ==
Urupema has a temperate oceanic climate (Köppen Cfb). Along with São Joaquim, Urubici, Bom Jardim da Serra and São José dos Ausentes, Urupema is considered the coldest city in Brazil if the maximum average temperature and the number of cold hours are considered. It is also the coldest in terms of absolute minimums together with Bom Jardim da Serra. Snowfall occurs during the winter and less frequently in fall and spring.

Climate data for Urupema (2010–2019)
Month	Jan	Feb	Mar	Apr	May	Jun	Jul	Aug	Sep	Oct	Nov	Dec	Year
Record high °C (°F)	31.1 (88.0)	32.3 (90.1)	28.5 (83.3)	27.5 (81.5)	25.2 (77.4)	23.5 (74.3)	25.7 (78.3)	27.8 (82.0)	28.8 (83.8)	29.4 (84.9)	28.5 (83.3)	30.5 (86.9)	32.3 (90.1)
Mean daily maximum °C (°F)	24.5 (76.1)	24.5 (76.1)	22.1 (71.8)	20.0 (68.0)	16.4 (61.5)	15.2 (59.4)	15.6 (60.1)	17.4 (63.3)	18.5 (65.3)	19.6 (67.3)	21.5 (70.7)	23.5 (74.3)	19.9 (67.8)
Daily mean °C (°F)	18.1 (64.6)	18.3 (64.9)	15.8 (60.4)	13.5 (56.3)	10.4 (50.7)	8.5 (47.3)	8.9 (48.0)	10.5 (50.9)	12.0 (53.6)	13.5 (56.3)	15.0 (59.0)	17.3 (63.1)	13.5 (56.3)
Mean daily minimum °C (°F)	12.8 (55.0)	13.5 (56.3)	10.7 (51.3)	7.9 (46.2)	5.1 (41.2)	2.7 (36.9)	3.2 (37.8)	4.4 (39.9)	6.2 (43.2)	8.0 (46.4)	9.2 (48.6)	12.0 (53.6)	8.0 (46.4)
Record low °C (°F)	1.4 (34.5)	1.5 (34.7)	−1.7 (28.9)	−4.4 (24.1)	−6.8 (19.8)	−9.2 (15.4)	−7.5 (18.5)	−8.3 (17.1)	−6.3 (20.7)	−4.7 (23.5)	−1.8 (28.8)	0.1 (32.2)	−9.2 (15.4)
Source: EPAGRI/CIRAM

== Demographics ==
As of 2022 Urupema is 62.3% White, 29.3% Mixed, 8.1% Black, 0.3% Yellow and 0.04% Indigenous while the sex ratio is 52% male and 48% female. (IBGE).

== See also ==
- Snow in Brazil
- List of municipalities in Santa Catarina
