= Bom Jesus, Rio Grande do Sul =

Municipality of Rio Grande do Sul, Brazil

Bom Jesus
- Municipality
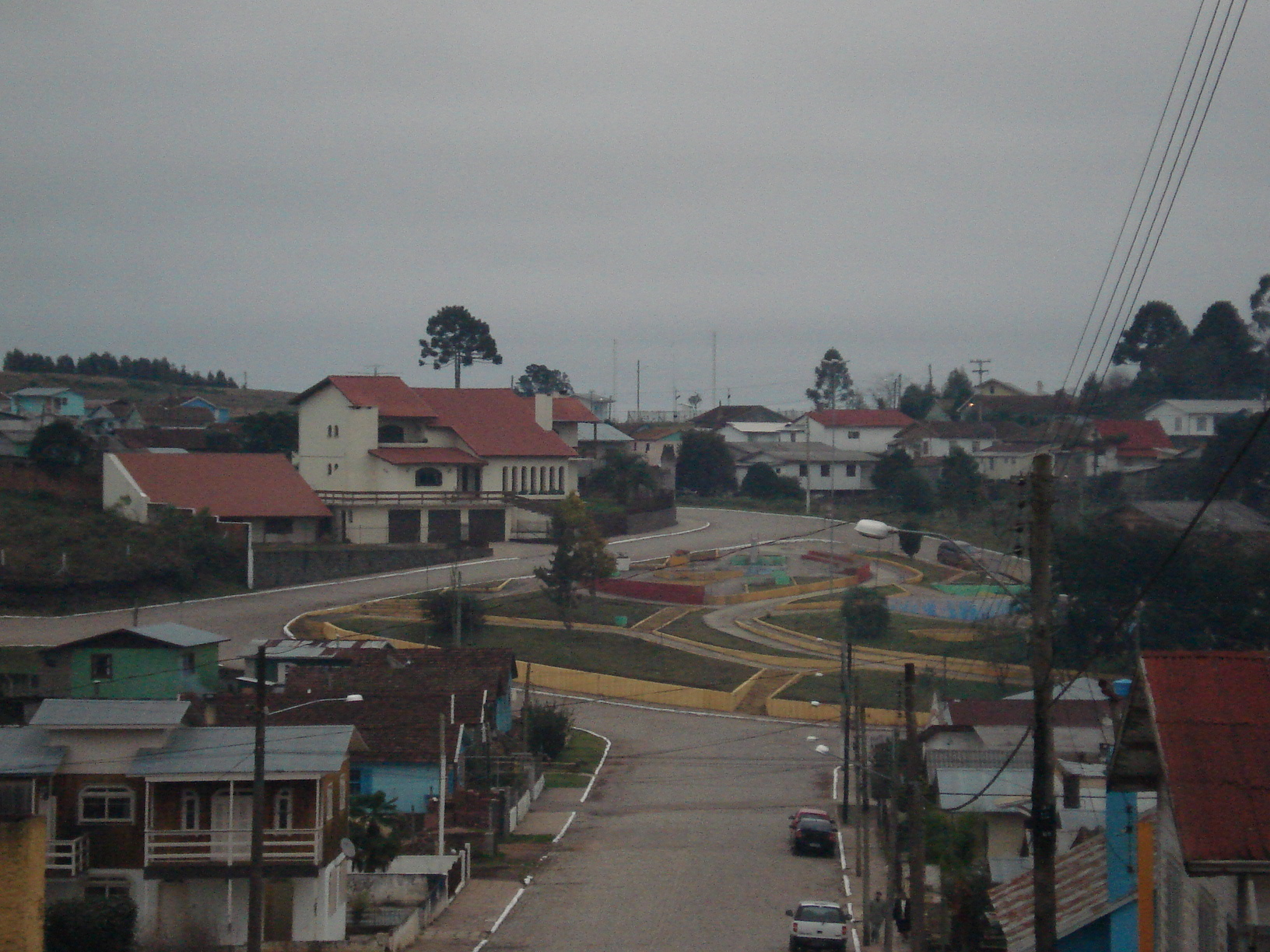

- Flag
- Nickname: BJ
- Coordinates: 28°40′04″S 50°25′01″W
- Country: Brazil
- State: Rio Grande do Sul
- Mesoregion: Nordeste Rio-grandense
- Microregion: Vacaria
- Founded: July 16, 1913

Government
  - Mayor: José Paulo de Almeida (PMDB)

Area
  - Total: 2,625.681 km^{2} (1,013.781 sq mi)
- Elevation: 1,046 m (3,432 ft)

Population (2020)
  - Total: 11,309
  - Density: 4.3071/km^{2} (11.155/sq mi)
- Time zone: UTC−3 (BRT)
- HDI: 0.75PNUD/2000
- GDP: R$ 90,120,000
- GDP per capita: R$8,035.00

Bom Jesus is a municipality in the state of Rio Grande do Sul, Brazil. Its population was approximately 11,309 in 2020.

The city is one of the coldest in Brazil, and snowfall is not uncommon.

== Geography ==
=== Climate ===
Climate data for Bom Jesus (1991–2020)
Month	Jan	Feb	Mar	Apr	May	Jun	Jul	Aug	Sep	Oct	Nov	Dec	Year
Record high °C (°F)	33.0 (91.4)	31.6 (88.9)	32.5 (90.5)	29.8 (85.6)	26.3 (79.3)	25.4 (77.7)	25.0 (77.0)	29.6 (85.3)	31.1 (88.0)	31.0 (87.8)	31.4 (88.5)	32.0 (89.6)	33.0 (91.4)
Mean daily maximum °C (°F)	25.6 (78.1)	25.4 (77.7)	24.3 (75.7)	21.8 (71.2)	18.3 (64.9)	17.1 (62.8)	16.8 (62.2)	19.0 (66.2)	19.6 (67.3)	21.5 (70.7)	23.3 (73.9)	25.2 (77.4)	21.5 (70.7)
Daily mean °C (°F)	19.4 (66.9)	19.2 (66.6)	18.0 (64.4)	15.6 (60.1)	12.3 (54.1)	11.1 (52.0)	10.5 (50.9)	12.2 (54.0)	13.2 (55.8)	15.3 (59.5)	16.7 (62.1)	18.6 (65.5)	15.2 (59.4)
Mean daily minimum °C (°F)	14.9 (58.8)	14.9 (58.8)	13.7 (56.7)	11.3 (52.3)	8.0 (46.4)	6.7 (44.1)	6.0 (42.8)	7.2 (45.0)	8.4 (47.1)	10.8 (51.4)	11.8 (53.2)	13.8 (56.8)	10.6 (51.1)
Record low °C (°F)	5.5 (41.9)	5.0 (41.0)	2.6 (36.7)	0.0 (32.0)	−4.2 (24.4)	−6.2 (20.8)	−7.2 (19.0)	−8.0 (17.6)	−4.2 (24.4)	−1.0 (30.2)	1.0 (33.8)	2.2 (36.0)	−8.0 (17.6)
Average precipitation mm (inches)	178.7 (7.04)	164.6 (6.48)	121.7 (4.79)	111.9 (4.41)	118.9 (4.68)	135.0 (5.31)	177.9 (7.00)	128.4 (5.06)	165.9 (6.53)	188.0 (7.40)	138.1 (5.44)	157.0 (6.18)	1,786.1 (70.32)
Average precipitation days (≥ 1.0 mm)	13	13	11	9	9	9	10	9	11	12	11	12	129
Average relative humidity (%)	79.5	80.4	80.7	80.9	82.9	82.7	80.0	74.9	77.6	78.7	76.2	77.1	79.3
Mean monthly sunshine hours	190.1	169.5	189.0	167.5	147.6	124.2	151.9	166.8	152.9	159.4	200.6	202.3	2,021.8
Source: Instituto Nacional de Meteorologia

== See also ==
- List of municipalities in Rio Grande do Sul
