= São Joaquim =

- Municipality
- Municipality of São Joaquim
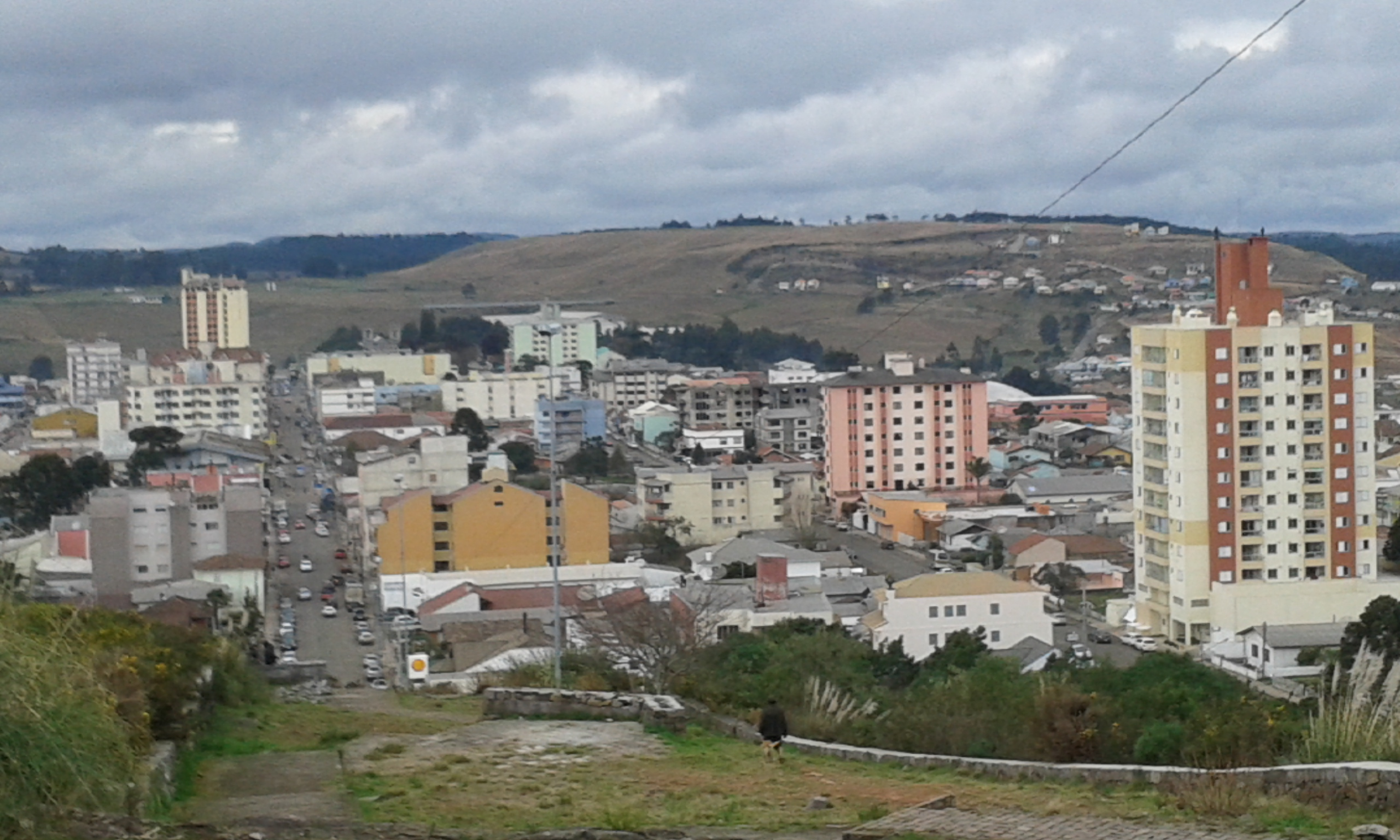
- 2014 view of São Joaquim

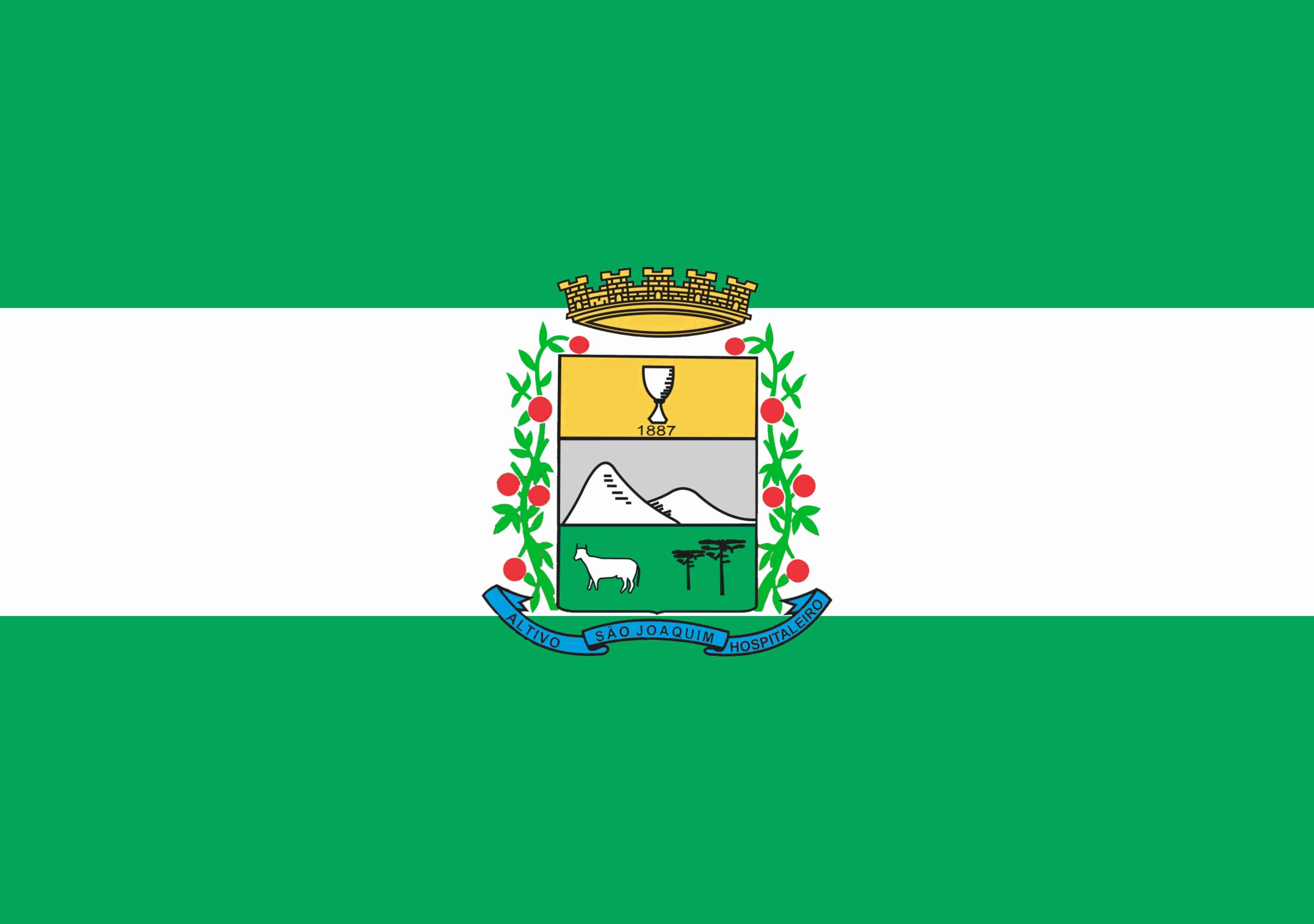
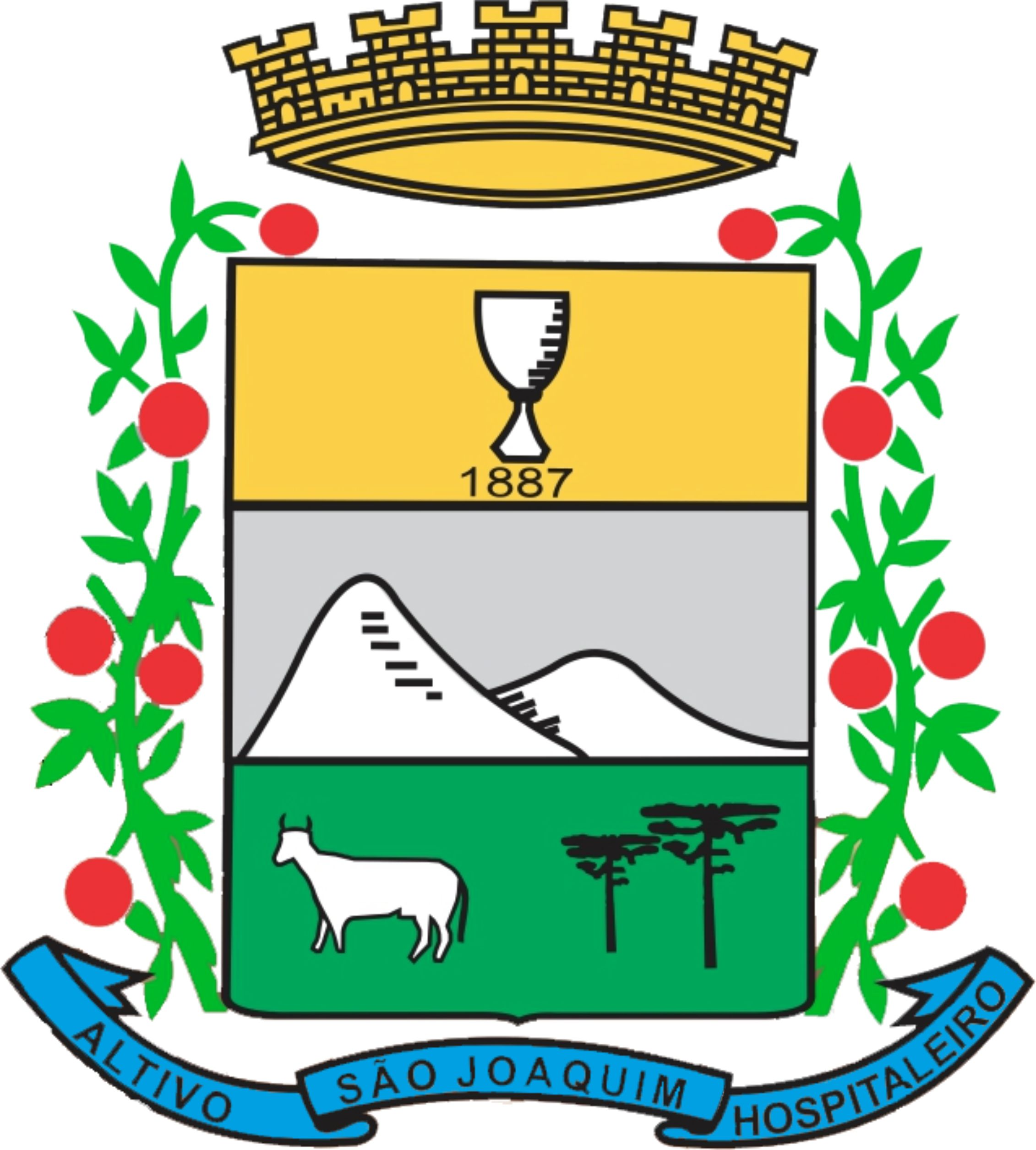
- Flag Coat of arms

- Location of São Joaquim
- Coordinates: 28°17′38″S 49°55′55″W
- Country: Brazil
- Region: South
- State: Santa Catarina
- Founded: April 7, 1887
- Named for: Saint Joachim

Government
  - Mayor: Giovani Nunes (PSDB)

Area
  - Total: 1,885.608 km^{2} (728.037 sq mi)
- Elevation: 1,360 m (4,460 ft)

Population (2020)
  - Total: 27,139
  - Density: 14.393/km^{2} (37.277/sq mi)
- Time zone: UTC-3 (UTC-3)
- HDI (2010): 0.687 – medium
- Website: saojoaquim.sc.gov.br

São Joaquim is a municipality in the state of Santa Catarina, situated in southern Brazil. Its population in 2020 was 27,139 inhabitants. Located in the Planalto Serrano, it lies 136 km (85 miles) from Tubarão, 81 km (50 miles) from Lages and 227 km (141 miles) from Florianópolis. The town is home to a variety of ethnic groups, including Italian, German, Portuguese, Japanese and Afro-Brazilians. There are also many people from other states in Brazil, especially from Rio Grande do Sul.

== Economy ==
The town's economy was once based on livestock, but recently the cultivation of fruits such as apples has become more prominent. Today, São Joaquim is the largest producer of fruit in the state, with over 1000 small producers. Tourism is also important for the town, as it is one of the coldest places in Brazil and sometimes receives snowfall, a rather uncommon occurrence in most of Brazil (although refrozen snow, not present in most of Brazil, seldom happens in many tropical areas as it does in about half of Southeastern Brazil). The town is also known for its wines, such as Villa Francioni, Joaquim, Quinta da Neve, Núbio and Suzin, which are reaching international recognition, especially in East Asia.

== Geography ==
At 1,360 metres (4,462 ft) above sea level, São Joaquim) has one of the highest city halls in the country. Its year-round mild climate and cold winter by Brazilian standards (but not restricted temperate species) allows apple cultivation as in other similar climate areas, leading to the promotion of the National Apple Festival. EPAGRI, the state's agricultural agency, has an experimental station where the cultivation of Fuji apples, brought by Fumio Hiragami brought from Curitibanos, is perfected. The plants come from Japan.

Its population was 24,812 inhabitants in the census of 2010. The municipality has an area of 1,892.26 km^{2}. It is part of the microregion of Campos de Lages, in the mesoregion of Serrana of Santa Catarina. But since mid-2017 it has been in the immediate region of Lages.

=== Climate ===
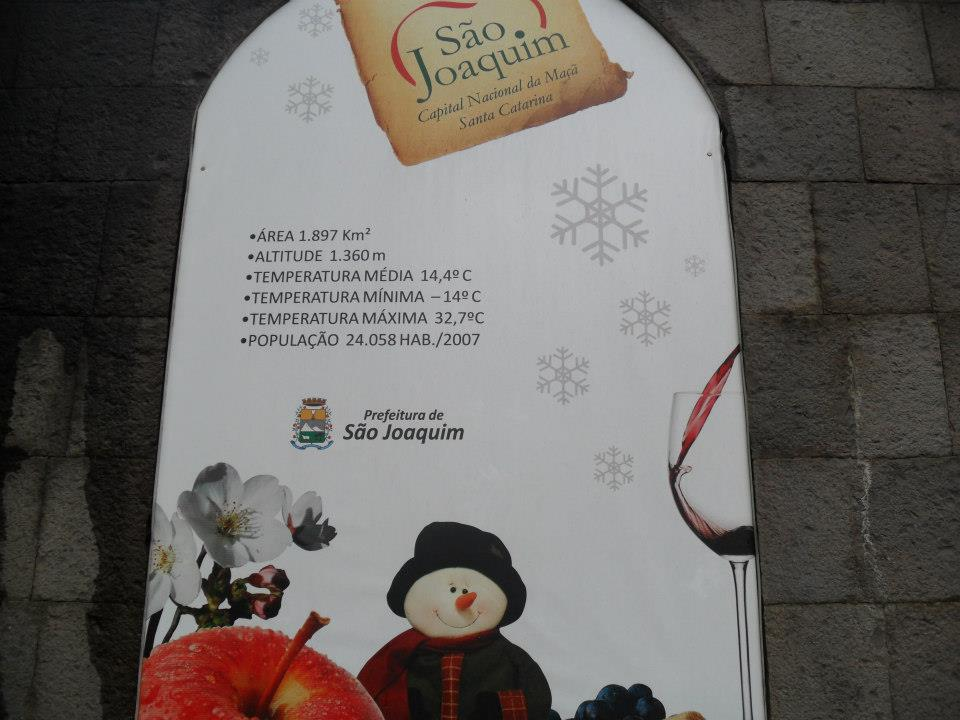
City hall sign indicating an absolute (unofficial) minimum temperature of −14.0 °C (6.8 °F)

Due to its altitude above 4430 ft (1350 m) and high latitude, the city has a temperate oceanic climate (Köppen: Cfb, Trewartha: Cflk) modified for precipitation sufficiently moist in every month, more abundant throughout the year (usually more evenly distributed than in Campos do Jordão), with mild summers and cool winters with low temperatures - but not below freezing. The average annual temperature is 11.4 °C to 14.3 °C. The maximum average does not exceed 20 °C. At the same time, the minimum averages are above 7 °C. The annual precipitation is high, from 1450 mm to 1650 mm, and about 135 rainy days. Winter precipitation can occur at crucial times in the season, but tend not to be plentiful and cumulative, except on a few occasions. Along with Urupema, Bom Jardim da Serra and São José dos Ausentes, São Joaquim is considered the coldest city in Brazil if the maximum average temperature and the number of cold hours are considered. During the winter months, frost is common - every month is subject to the phenomenon, which is more common from May to September (in years of La Niña from April to October), although strong masses of polar air may enter as early as April. Outside winter, spring and fall may receive frosts due to the prevailing cold dry air. Frost can occur even in midsummer There are 40.8 days on average per year when freezing of soil and plants occurs between the years of 1980 and 2003 registered by the meteorological station in the place.

Occasionally, on more intensely cold days, precipitation occurs as snow. It is one of the few Brazilian cities that receives snow almost every year, an uncommon phenomenon in the south of the country. In 1990 there were 12 days of snow, one of the snowiest years of the century. The snow was already registered from April to October, with the earliest occurring on April 16 and 17, 1999 (was the first snowfall this month, the second was in 2016), and the later on October 3 of the same year, in the Cruzeiro district (in the city on September 30, 1980). August is the most snow-favoring month. Between 1999 and 2010 were 10 days. In general from June to August it can snow.

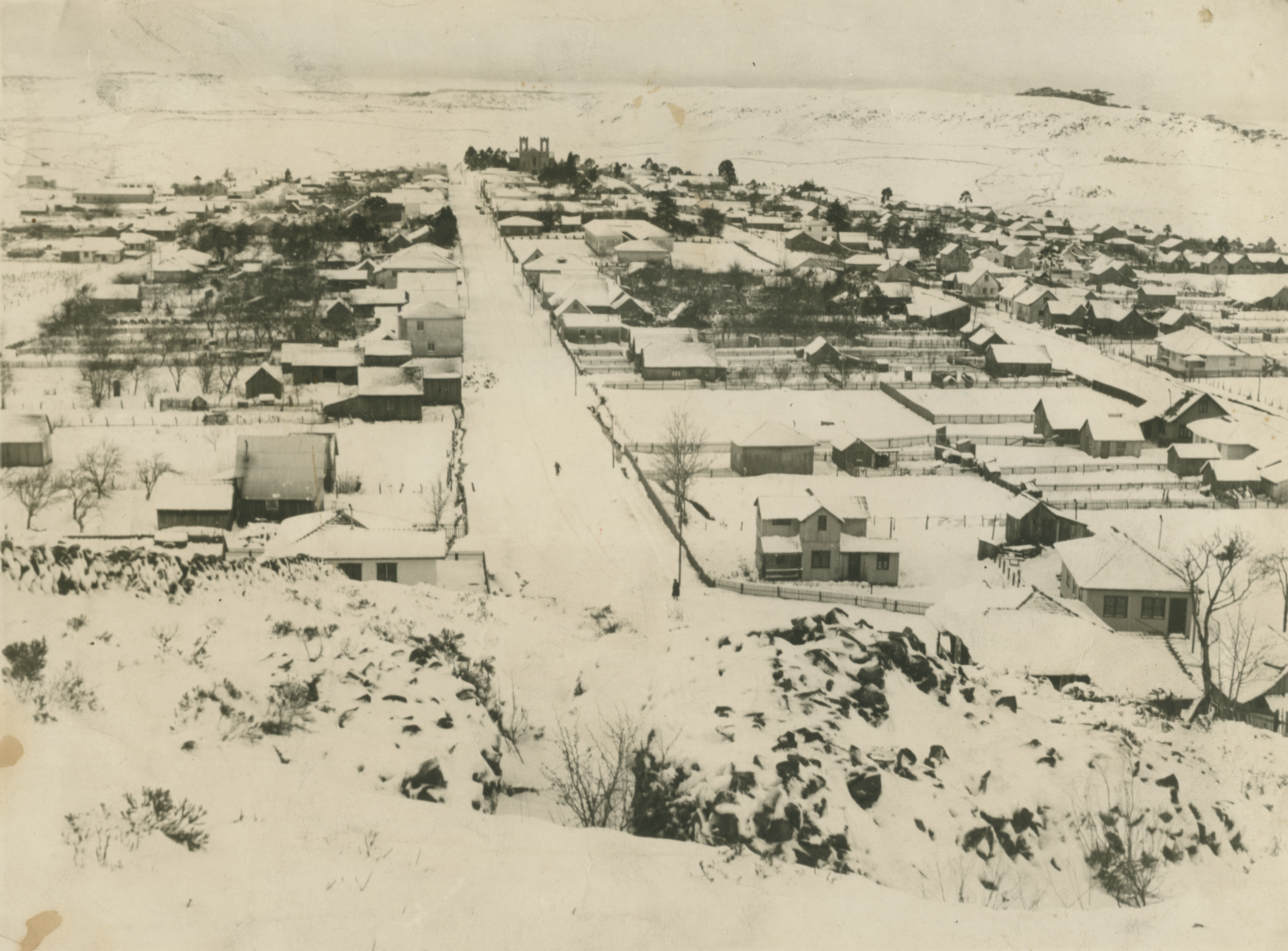
São Joaquim covered with snow in 1968

According to data from the National Institute of Meteorology (INMET), from 1961 to 1983, 1988 to 1989, 1991 to 1998 and from 2000 to 2017, the lowest temperature recorded in São Joaquim (conventional station) was -10 °C (15.8 °F) on August 2, 1991. Since 1961 there have been 10 times where the minimum temperatures reached -7 °C (19.4 °F) or less. For the same period until October 10, 2018, were 435 times when the temperature was at -1 °C (30.2 °F) or less below zero at 57 years. The highest reached 31.4 °C (88.5 °F) on December 20, 1971. Temperature records above 30 °C (86 °F) also occurred on December 19, 1971 (31 °C or 87.8 °F), January 4, 1963 (30.6 °C or 87.1 °F), January 6, 1963 (30.4 °C or 86.7 °F), February 1973 (30.1 °C or 86.2 °F) and 17 December 1995 30 °C (86 °F). All in just 4 occasions the temperature has surpassed 30 °C (86 °F) since 1961, which is rare for a city in the 28th parallel or even for elevation. On July 13, 2000, the temperature did not exceed -2 °C (28.4 °F), which was the lowest recorded in the period.

Largest accumulations of precipitation at 24 hours registered in São Joaquim by months (INMET, 1961–present (Note: Period: 01/01/1961 to 12/31/1983, 01/01/1988 to 12/31/1989, 01/01/1992 to 12/31/1998 and 01/01/2000 to 05/31/2017))
Month	Accumulated	Date
January	86.5 mm (3.41 in)	January 1, 1979
February	105.5 mm (4.15 in)	February 21, 1994
March	76.7 mm (3.02 in)	March 25, 1964
April	83.7 mm (3.3 in)	April 28, 1998
May	101.7 mm (4.480 in)	May 28, 1992
June	82.4 mm (3.24 in)	June 25, 2014
July	124.2 mm (4.89 in)	July 6, 1983
August	123.1 mm (4.85 in)	August 17, 1983
September	111.4 mm (4.39 in)	September 19, 2015
October	113.8 mm (4.48 in)	October 14, 2014
November	109.3 mm (4.3 in)	November 6, 1974
December	71.2 mm (2.8 in)	December 1, 1976

The largest accumulated precipitation in 24 hours was 124.2 mm (4.889 in) on July 6, 1983. Other large accumulations were 123.1 mm (4.846 in) on August 17, 1983, 123 mm (4.843 in) on July 4, 1993,112 mm (4.415 in) on October 1, 2001, 111.6 mm (4.394 in) on August 9, 2011, 111.4 mm (4.386 in) on September 19, 2015, 109.3 mm (4.303 in) on November 6, 1974, 108.8 mm (4.282 in) on August 19, 1965, 107.5 mm(4.232 in) on September 28, 2009, 105.5 mm (4.154 in) on February 21, 1994, 101.7 mm (4.004 in) on May 28, 1992, and 101.4 mm (3.992 in) on February 22, 1961. The month of greatest precipitation was July 1983, with 28.992 in (736.4 mm). The lowest relative air humidity was on August 30, 1976, with 19.5%. With a value below 20% there was another occasion on June 12, 1996, with 19.75% relative humidity, which is confused with the driest season of the year.

==== Snow and features ====
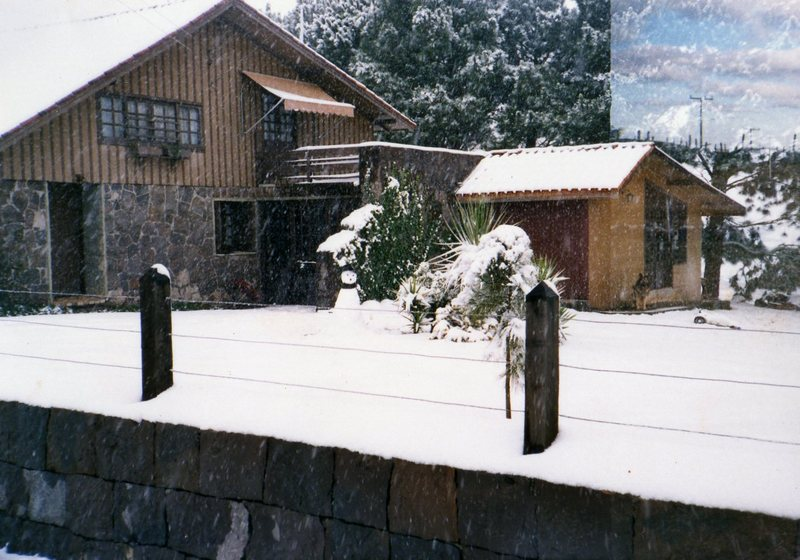
A house covered in snow during the 1988 snowfall

São Joaquim is one of the few Brazilian cities where snow is relatively common every year and is the snowiest city in the country, which makes it a tourist destination. Located in an elevated area, it is an urban area with the highest number of snowy days, despite its location in relation to other higher rural areas. On July 20, 1957, the city suffered the second largest blizzard in the country, and the largest in Santa Catarina with 1.3 m of accumulated snow. The city was isolated for a week and received supplies by air. It snowed for seven uninterrupted hours, and continued sporadically in the days following, temporarily closing the highways.

Studies show the increase of the precipitation frequency with the warm phase of the Pacific decadal oscillation (PDO) and its decrease during the El Niño and La Niña episodes. The average is 2.7 days per year in São Joaquim (value close to that of Greenville in the US) with the majority coming from polar anticyclones with an extratropical cyclone. The maximum gap in the monthly range of snowfall was between April and October, i.e. between autumn and the first weeks of spring, considering the years 1980 to 2013. In the same interval the year with the most frequency was in 1990, at the same time that there were years without any occurrence. In descending order July and August are the snowiest months, period most affected by cold air masses. Between 1980 and 2010, the city had 103 cases of snow, if the distribution were even, this would mean that in each year there were at least 3 days with this type of precipitation. In 36% of the cases, there is a causal relationship with the arrival of cold waves. A few years that it did not snow are 1971, 1986 and 2005.

Climate data for São Joaquim, elevation 1,415 m (4,642 ft), (1991–2020 normals, extremes 1961–present)
Month	Jan	Feb	Mar	Apr	May	Jun	Jul	Aug	Sep	Oct	Nov	Dec	Year
Record high °C (°F)	30.6 (87.1)	30.1 (86.2)	28.0 (82.4)	26.9 (80.4)	25.2 (77.4)	22.8 (73.0)	24.1 (75.4)	27.7 (81.9)	28.4 (83.1)	28.9 (84.0)	28.1 (82.6)	31.4 (88.5)	31.4 (88.5)
Mean daily maximum °C (°F)	22.5 (72.5)	22.2 (72.0)	21.1 (70.0)	19.1 (66.4)	15.8 (60.4)	14.6 (58.3)	14.6 (58.3)	16.9 (62.4)	17.0 (62.6)	18.8 (65.8)	20.4 (68.7)	22.3 (72.1)	18.9 (66.0)
Daily mean °C (°F)	17.2 (63.0)	17.3 (63.1)	16.1 (61.0)	13.9 (57.0)	10.8 (51.4)	9.8 (49.6)	9.5 (49.1)	11.3 (52.3)	11.5 (52.7)	13.5 (56.3)	14.7 (58.5)	16.6 (61.9)	13.5 (56.3)
Mean daily minimum °C (°F)	13.0 (55.4)	13.3 (55.9)	12.6 (54.7)	10.4 (50.7)	7.5 (45.5)	6.5 (43.7)	5.9 (42.6)	7.2 (45.0)	7.5 (45.5)	9.6 (49.3)	10.5 (50.9)	12.4 (54.3)	9.8 (49.6)
Record low °C (°F)	3.5 (38.3)	4.2 (39.6)	0.3 (32.5)	−2.9 (26.8)	−6.8 (19.8)	−7.2 (19.0)	−9.0 (15.8)	−8.2 (17.2)	−7.5 (18.5)	−2.4 (27.7)	−1.5 (29.3)	1.4 (34.5)	−9.0 (15.8)
Average precipitation mm (inches)	185.4 (7.30)	180.7 (7.11)	126.6 (4.98)	110.9 (4.37)	134.8 (5.31)	137.3 (5.41)	166.5 (6.56)	137.2 (5.40)	181.3 (7.14)	198.9 (7.83)	146.8 (5.78)	151.5 (5.96)	1,857.9 (73.15)
Average precipitation days (≥ 1.0 mm)	14	14	11	9	9	9	10	9	11	12	11	12	131
Average relative humidity (%)	84.6	85.7	85.5	84.4	84.2	81.7	79.9	75.4	79.9	82.9	80.5	81.2	82.2
Mean monthly sunshine hours	176.2	152.4	176.7	159.6	152.1	133.0	153.5	156.7	145.8	152.4	185.6	181.6	1,925.6
Source 1: Instituto Nacional de Meteorologia
Source 2: Schimtz (snowy days) Open climate chart for this city

== Panorama ==
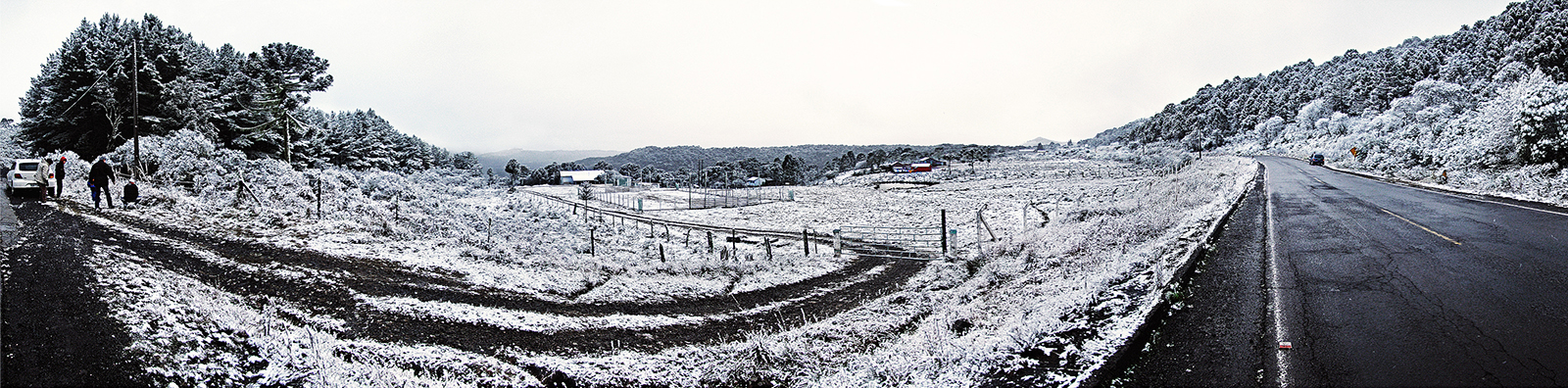
Panoramic view of a snowy winter afternoon, on the outskirts of São Joaquim in August 2010

== See also ==
- Urubici
- Morro da Igreja
- Snow in Brazil
