= Bom Jardim da Serra =

- Municipality
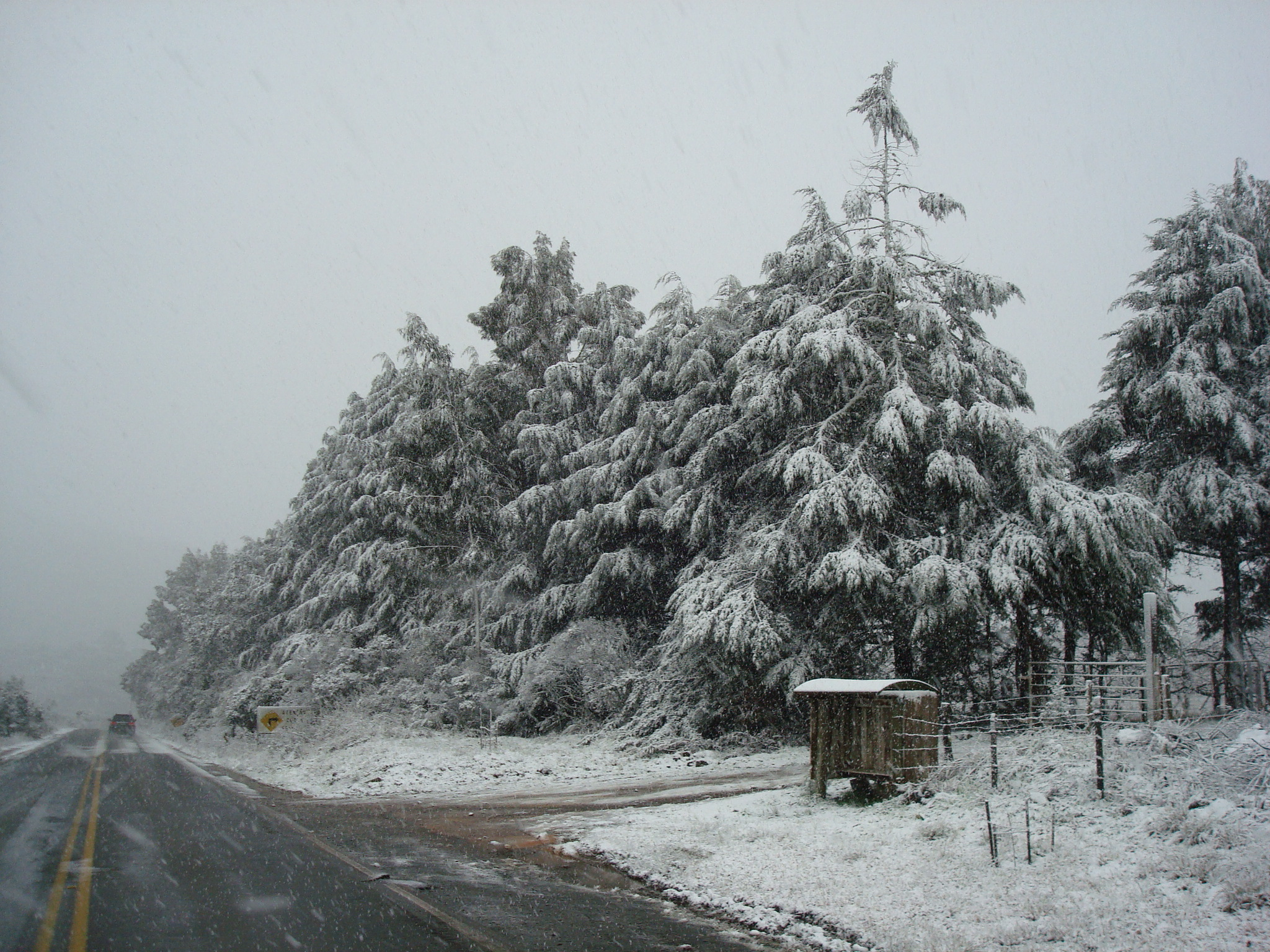
- Snow in Bom Jardim da Serra

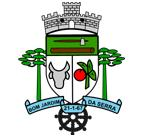
- Flag Coat of arms

- Location in Brazil
- Coordinates: 28°20′S 49°38′W
- Country: Brazil
- Region: South
- State: Santa Catarina
- Mesoregion: Serrana

Population (2020)
  - Total: 4,772
- Time zone: UTC -3

Bom Jardim da Serra is a municipality in the state of Santa Catarina in the South region of Brazil. It has an area of approximately 935 km^{2}.

The city is one of the coldest in Brazil, and sometimes there is a chance of snow.

== History ==
Bom Jardim da Serra was a part of São Joaquim municipality, the city was discovered in 1870, and it became municipality on 26 January 1967.

== Geography ==
Located at 1,245 meters above sea level, Bom Jardim da Serra is a calm city, with its 4,772 inhabitants. The average temperature is 5 °C (41 °F) in the winter and 14 °C (57 °F) during the summer. On June 19, 2023, in Bom Jardim da Serra, a temperature of −10.9 °C (12.4 °F) was recorded. This temperature was the lowest temperature recorded in a standardized station of Santa Catarina state, surpassing the −10 °C recorded in São Joaquim, on August 2, 1991.

== See also ==
- List of municipalities in Santa Catarina
- Snow in Brazil
