= Serrana (Santa Catarina) =

Mesoregion in Santa Catarina, Brazil

Coordinates: 27°40′16″S 51°03′29″W

Meso region Serrana

Serrana is a mesoregion in the Brazilian state of Santa Catarina.
