= Agulhas Negras Peak =

Mountain in Brazil

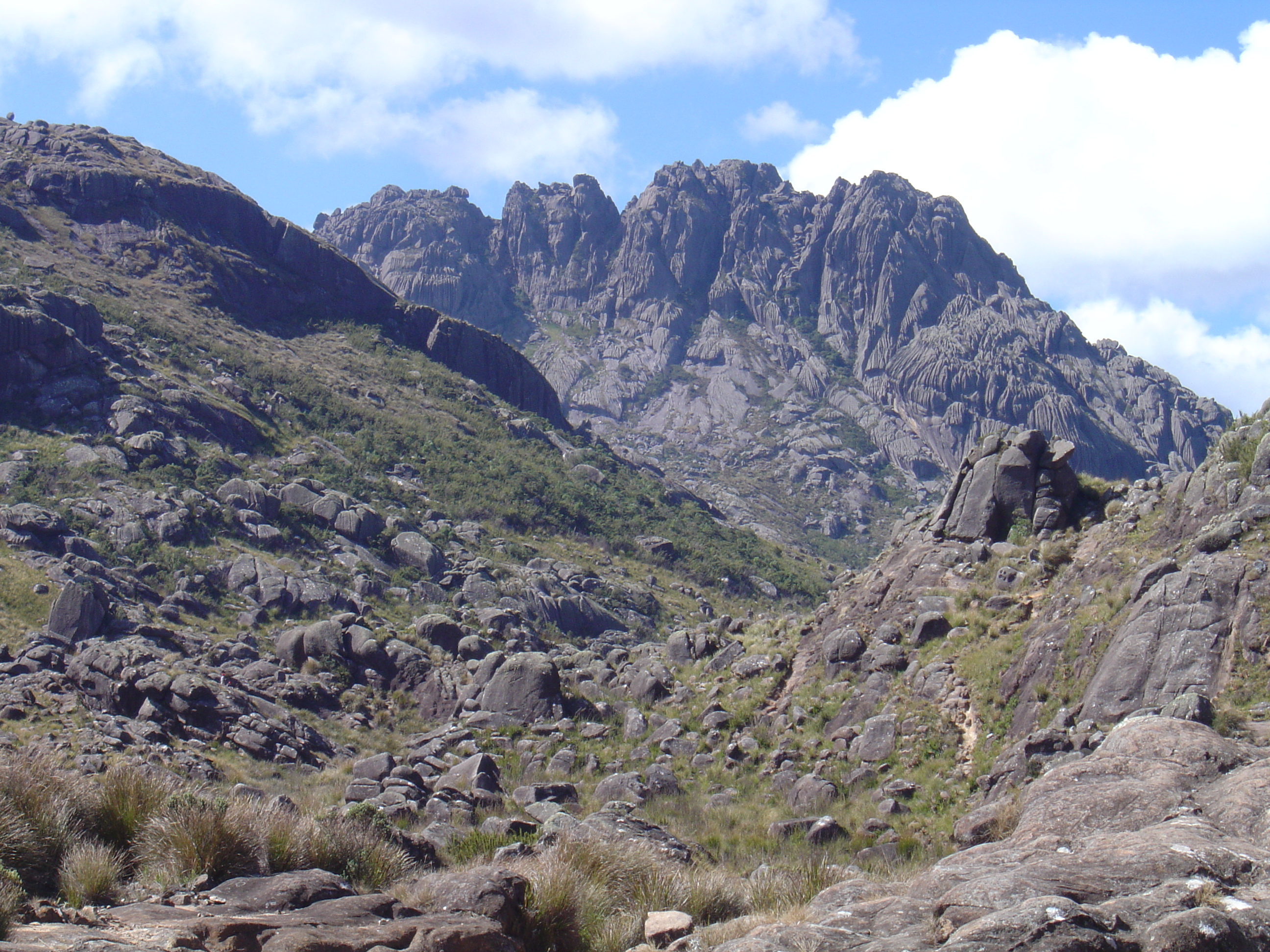
- Summit

Highest point
- Elevation: 2,791 m (9,157 ft)
- Prominence: 1,115 m (3,658 ft)
- Coordinates: 22°22′48″S 44°39′42″W

Geography
- Location within Brazil
- Location: Resende, Rio de Janeiro and Minas Gerais, Brazil
- Parent range: Serra da Mantiqueira

Climbing
- First ascent: 1919
- Easiest route: By car from Rio de Janeiro or São Paulo on the Via Dutra highway up to Engenheiro Passos; from there on BR-354 highway toward Itamonte until the Garganta do Registro mountain pass; then on a gravel road (BR-485) to Itatiaia National Park's north entrance and from there to Abrigo Rebouças mountain shelter; easy trek to the peak base; steep climb on rock afterwards.

Agulhas Negras Peak (Portuguese: Pico das Agulhas Negras, Portuguese pronunciation: [ˈpiku daz aˈɡuʎɐz ˈneɡɾɐs], lit. 'Black Needles Peak') is the fifth-highest mountain in Brazil, (Note: The four higher Brazilian mountains are Pico da Neblina 2,995 metres (9,826 ft), Pico 31 de Março 2,974 metres (9,757 ft), Pico da Bandeira 2,891 metres (9,485 ft), and Pedra da Mina 2,798 metres (9,180 ft). Pico das Agulhas Negras becomes the eighth-highest peak in Brazil (and the sixth-highest in Minas Gerais) if three peaks in the Caparaó range are counted: Pico do Calçado 2,849 metres (9,347 ft), Pico do Cruzeiro 2,852 metres (9,357 ft), and Pico do Calçado-Mirim 2,818 metres (9,245 ft). However, the Brazilian Institute of Geography and Statistics considers those peaks just secondary summits of Pico da Bandeira, and does not list them in its ranking of the highest Brazilian mountains, due to proximity and topographic prominence issues. Nonetheless, it is undisputed that Pico das Agulhas Negras is the highest point of Rio de Janeiro state and the second-highest in the Mantiqueira range.) standing at 2,791 metres (9,157 ft) above sea level, making it one of the highest in the Brazilian Highlands. It is located in Itatiaia National Park, in the Mantiqueira range, on the border of the states of Rio de Janeiro and Minas Gerais. It is the highest point in the state of Rio de Janeiro, the third-highest in Minas Gerais, and the second-highest in the Mantiqueira range.

The climb to the top of the mountain was first attempted by Franklin Massena in the year 1856. Further attempts were made by André Rebouças in 1878 and by Horácio de Carvalho in 1898, but the summit was only reached by Carlos Spierling and Osvaldo Leal in 1919.

== Etymology ==
Its name means Black Needles Peak, because of the sharp dark rocks on its top, which give it a distinctive shape. The peak's massif is known as Itatiaia, which means "stone with many sharp points" in the Tupi language. The highest rock, with the summit, is known as Itatiaiaçu, or simply Açu (a Tupi suffix meaning "big") among Brazilian mountaineers.

== Geography ==
Agulhas Negras Peak can be seen to the northwest of Resende when driving between São Paulo and Rio de Janeiro on the Via Dutra highway, but this is only possible at a few points on the road, because a lower mountain range closer to the road stands in the line-of-sight at most other nearby spots.

A mountain shelter called Abrigo Rebouças is located near the base of the peak, at an elevation of about 2,350 metres (7,710 ft). It is accessible by a gravel road (BR-485) from the BR-354 federal highway at the Garganta do Registro mountain pass, via Itatiaia National Park's north entrance. The access road reaches an altitude of 2,460 metres (8,070 ft) at the entrance of the park, and a short spur from it leading to a communications tower of the Eletrobras Furnas electricity company reaches 2,662 metres (8,734 ft); these are the highest points one can reach in a regular car (as opposed to off-road vehicles) in Brazil.

== Climate ==
Climate data for Parque Nacional Do Itatiaia(2018-Present)
Month	Jan	Feb	Mar	Apr	May	Jun	Jul	Aug	Sep	Oct	Nov	Dec	Year
Record high °C (°F)	21.6 (70.9)	21.3 (70.3)	20.5 (68.9)	20.1 (68.2)	20.1 (68.2)	18.9 (66.0)	21.3 (70.3)	20.1 (68.2)	22.8 (73.0)	23.6 (74.5)	21.2 (70.2)	22 (72)	23.6 (74.5)
Mean daily maximum °C (°F)	18 (64)	16.6 (61.9)	17 (63)	15.7 (60.3)	14.2 (57.6)	13.7 (56.7)	13.7 (56.7)	14.3 (57.7)	17.7 (63.9)	16.9 (62.4)	16.3 (61.3)	17.3 (63.1)	16.0 (60.7)
Daily mean °C (°F)	13.7 (56.7)	12.9 (55.2)	12.2 (54.0)	10.1 (50.2)	8.6 (47.5)	7.9 (46.2)	6.8 (44.2)	7.9 (46.2)	11.1 (52.0)	12 (54)	11.6 (52.9)	12.9 (55.2)	10.6 (51.2)
Mean daily minimum °C (°F)	9.3 (48.7)	9.2 (48.6)	7.4 (45.3)	4.5 (40.1)	2.9 (37.2)	2.2 (36.0)	−0.1 (31.8)	1.4 (34.5)	4.5 (40.1)	7.2 (45.0)	6.9 (44.4)	8.5 (47.3)	5.3 (41.6)
Record low °C (°F)	2.1 (35.8)	1.5 (34.7)	−3.9 (25.0)	−5.1 (22.8)	−5.9 (21.4)	−5.4 (22.3)	−9.9 (14.2)	−7.7 (18.1)	−6.2 (20.8)	−5.6 (21.9)	−3.1 (26.4)	1.9 (35.4)	−9.9 (14.2)

== Elevation measurements ==
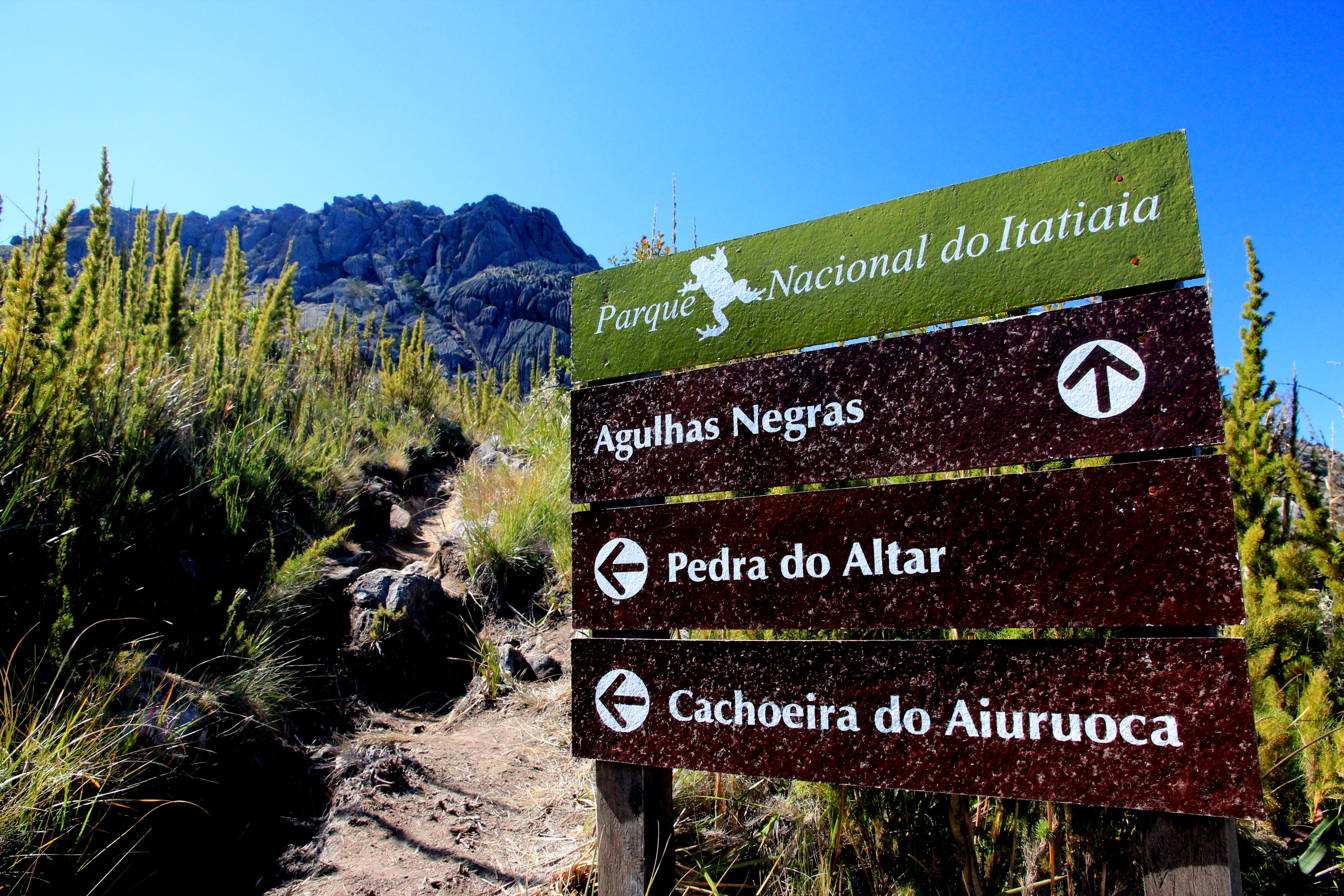
Tourist information signs in Itatiaia National Park close to Pico das Agulhas Negras, with the peak in the background.

For years, Agulhas Negras was thought to be the highest mountain in Brazil. The title later went to Pico da Bandeira, in the Caparaó range between the states of Minas Gerais and Espírito Santo (now known to be at 2,891 metres (9,485 ft)). In 1965, it was found that Pico da Neblina, in the state of Amazonas, was, in fact, the highest, with a currently revised height of 2,995 metres (9,826 ft).

Even then, Agulhas Negras was still thought to be the highest point in the Mantiqueira range, until a 2001 GPS measurement (later confirmed by an official joint expedition of the Brazilian Army and the Brazilian Institute for Geography and Statistics - IBGE) showed that nearby Pedra da Mina was that mountain range's highest point at 2,798 metres (9,180 ft), about seven metres higher than Agulhas Negras. Pedra da Mina was higher even though Agulhas Negras was also found to be slightly higher than previously thought, at 2,791.55 metres (9,158.6 ft), rather than its previous official altitude of 2,787 metres (9,144 ft). Agulhas Negras remains the highest point in the state of Rio de Janeiro.

In 2015, IBGE completed a new and more accurate mapping of the Brazilian territory regarding the geoid, the irregular imaginary surface based on the Earth's gravitational field that is the reference for altitude measurements. This led the institution to recalculate the altitude of the mountains measured in the earlier project, according to the new reference. The new data were published in February 2016. Agulhas Negras was then found to stand at 2,790.94 metres (9,156.6 ft), a difference of 61 cm or about two feet.
