= National Institute of Meteorology =

Meteorological organization of Brazil

- Portuguese: Instituto Nacional de Meteorlogia

Agency overview
- Formed: 18 November 1909; 116 years ago
- Jurisdiction: Brazil
- Headquarters: Brasília, Federal District
- Employees: 99
- Agency executive: Naur Pontes, Director
- Parent department: Ministry of Agriculture and Livestock
- Website: https://portal.inmet.gov.br/

The National Institute of Meteorology (Portuguese: Instituto Nacional de Meteorologia, INMET) is the national meteorological organization of Brazil, responsible for weather forecasting, collecting climate data, and alerting the public of extreme weather. It is part of the Ministry of Agriculture, Livestock and Food Supply.

Employing 99 people and with an annual budget of about 16 million USD, it is a member of the World Meteorological Organization. Its director as of April 2021 is Miguel Ivan Lacerda de Oliveira.

INMET traces its origins to a 1909 decree by then president of Brazil Nilo Peçanha, establishing the Directorate of Meteorology and Astronomy (Directoria de Meteorologia e Astronomia).
