= Rick Sollo =

Brazilian singer, songwriter and producer (1966–2026)

- Sollo in 2024

Background information
- Born: Geraldo Antônio de Carvalho; 5 December 1966; Monte do Carmo, Goiás, Brazil
- Died: 21 September 2026 (aged 59) Urubici, Santa Catarina, Brazil
- Genre: Sertanejo music
- Occupations: Singer-songwriter; record producer
- Years active: 1976–2026
- Labels: Chantecler / Continental; Warner Music; Universal Records
- Website: rickerenner.art.br

Geraldo Antônio de Carvalho (5 December 1966 – 21 September 2026), better known as Rick Sollo or simply Rick, was a Brazilian singer, songwriter and producer of sertanejo music. He formed the duo Rick & Renner with singer Renner Reis, and had his successful compositions recorded by several sertanejo music artists. By forming the duo, he stood out as one of the rare black performers in modern sertanejo music and one of the most important names in the history of the genre. Sollo was reported missing after a helicopter carrying five people crashed near Urubici, Brazil. He was confirmed dead on 22 September 2026.

== Early life and career ==
Geraldo Antônio de Carvalho was born in the city of Monte do Carmo, Tocantins on 5 December 1966. The son of Aldenora Cirilo de Carvalho, he developed a love for music through the influence of his father, Vitor Antônio, who always sang and composed songs for the Folia de Reis (a traditional Brazilian Christmas celebration). At just 10 years old, he began his musical career, and his first duo was with his sister Dalva, known as Sereno & Serenata. However, the duo didn't last long because, being a woman and part of a traditional family, her father forbade her from singing at night. Rick sought other partnerships, and in one of them adopted his current pseudonym, and the duo began their activities as Rick & Ray (names inspired by two members of Menudo). The duo lasted until Rick partnered with Renner in 1986, and from then on they began singing in nightclubs. For five years they only played gigs at night until recording an independent CD in 1991, but that CD is currently out of print. Their first officially recognized CD was released in 1992 by the Chantecler label, but their big break came in 1998 with the release of the song "Ela é Demais" (She's Amazing).

For 25 years, the duo Rick & Renner sold over 10 million CDs. Rick also distinguished himself in music as a composer, writing highly successful songs recorded by artists such as Chitãozinho & Xororó, Gian & Giovani, João Paulo & Daniel, Gino & Geno, among others. After deciding to pursue a solo career, Rick signed in 2011 with Talismã Music, the management company of singer Leonardo, which also manages the careers of Eduardo Costa, Paula Fernandes, Pedro & Thiago, and Di Paullo & Paulino. In July, this partnership was further solidified with the release of his first solo CD, Pronto pra Te Amar (Ready to Love You). The new work features 13 tracks, all written by him, and with very special appearances by Leonardo and Eduardo Costa. "I created this work with great care, out of respect for those who admire my work. Every detail was thought out to please the fans and appreciators of good music," said Rick.

Rick & Renner reunited on 24 September 2012, with the same essence as before, however, to the surprise of fans, on 5 January 2015 Rick announced their separation again, after Renner had further legal problems.

Still in 2015, the singer prepared the release of his new CD entitled Foi Deus. The album contains unreleased tracks and re-recordings of sertanejo hits, and also features special appearances by Daniel, Rionegro & Solimões, Chitãozinho & Xororó, Gusttavo Lima, Marciano, Bonni & Belucco and Fábio de Melo. It is the second CD released in his solo career and the first to be released after his second separation from Renner. The first single was "Eu Amo Sim", which had already been released and played on the radio. In the same year, Rick released the song "Perfeição", which is a tribute to his wife Geralda, with whom he had lived for 30 years. He is the father of six children, Victor Henrique and Mônica, the twins Valentino and Matteo from his second marriage, he also has a younger daughter, Lúcia, and a son, Renn, from another relationship. The singer is the grandfather of Mateus, Mônica's son. In 2017, the singer announced a partnership with singer Giovani, lead singer of the duo Gian and Giovani (who at the time was also pursuing a solo career), called "Dois Corações" (Two Hearts). In the same year, the music video for the first single "Tudo Que Eu Tenho" (Everything I Have) was released. The second single from the project was "Sonhar Com Você" (Dreaming of You), which has a music video that reached one million views on YouTube in less than a week, and was recorded in New York during a tour that Rick & Giovani did in the United States. In 2018, the singer returned to the partnership with Renner and announced it on 12 August on Domingão do Faustão.

== Personal life ==
Sollo married Geralda Carvalho in 2015, whom he met early in his career in the mid-1980s. He was the father of two children, Victor Henrique and Mônica. The singer is the grandfather of Mateus, Maria Helena, Mariana and Isabela.

== 2026 helicopter crash and death ==
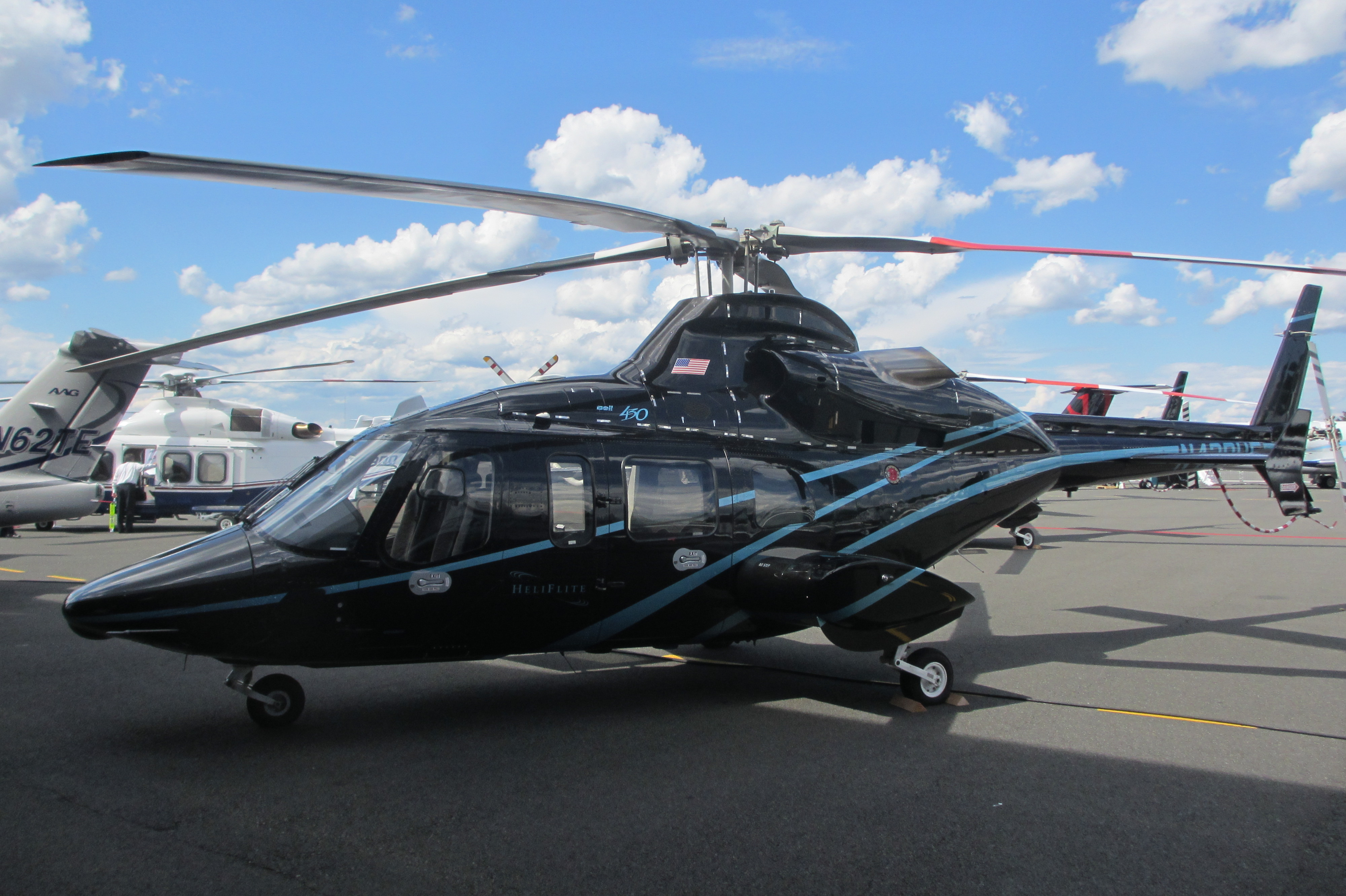
A Bell 430 helicopter, similar to the one involved in the accident

On 21 September 2026, a Bell 430 helicopter with registration PP-MGR disappeared during a flight between Porto Belo and São Joaquim in Santa Catarina. The helicopter took off from Costa Esmeralda, Porto Belo, at 11:00 a.m. The trip took place during a period marked by severe weather conditions in the mountainous region of Santa Catarina, with storms, low visibility and gusts of wind. The occupants consisted of the pilot and co-pilot, Sollo, businessman Bruno Avelar and videomaker Paulo Soares. The aircraft did not reach its intended destination and lost communication during the journey at around 1:00 p.m. Rick and Bruno had a lunch scheduled with the mayor of São Joaquim, José Teodoro de Sena, at noon at a local winery.

The searches were coordinated by the Curitiba Aeronautical Rescue Coordination Center (Salvaero Curitiba), with the participation of the Brazilian Air Force (FAB) and the Santa Catarina Military Fire Department. The Brazilian Air Force deployed Sikorsky UH-60 Black Hawk and SC-105 Amazonas aircraft in the operation.

Initially, firefighters concentrated their search in the locality of Vacas Gordas in Urubici after receiving information about a possible crash, however, no trace of the aircraft was found at the site. Subsequently, the teams began searching near the point where the last cell phone signal from one of the occupants was registered, in the São Joaquim region. The two search areas were separated by approximately 30 kilometers.

On 22 September 2026, the Military Firefighters Corps of Santa Catarina found the remains of the helicopter and confirmed the death of the five people on board. The aircraft's flight recorder was recovered from the site a day later by the Brazilian Air Force and sent to the Flight Recorder Data Reading and Analysis Laboratory, responsible for verifying its contents.

== Discography ==
=== Solo career ===
Studio albums

Album	Details
Pronto Pra Te Amar	Release date: 2011; Formats: CD, download digital; Record label: Talismã Music/Radar Records
Foi Deus	Release date: 2015; Formats: CD, download digital; Record label: Universal Music

Singles

Year	Single	Charts	Album
Year	Single	BRA	Album
2011	"Vem Camila"	47	Pronto Pra Te Amar
2011	"De Volta Pro Meu Coração"	80	Pronto Pra Te Amar
2015	"Eu Amo Sim"	43	Foi Deus
2016	"Eu Menti" (part. Gusttavo Lima)	—	Foi Deus
2017	"Tudo Que Eu Tenho"	96	Projeto Dois Corações (com Giovani)
2017	"Sonhar Com Você"	79	Projeto Dois Corações (com Giovani)

=== Rick & Renner ===
==== Studio albums ====
- 1991: Atitudes
- 1993: Rick & Renner
- 1994: Rick & Renner Vol. 2
- 1995: Rick & Renner Volume III
- 1997: Rick & Renner Vol. 4
- 1998: Mil Vezes Cantarei
- 1999: Instante Mágico
- 2000: Seguir em Frente
- 2001: É Dez, É Cem, É Mil
- 2002: Só Pensando Em Você
- 2003: 10 Anos de Sucesso – Acústico
- 2004: Só Nós Dois
- 2006: Bom de Dança
- 2007: Coisa de Deus.
- 2008: Passe o Tempo que Passar
- 2010: Happy End
- 2012: Inacreditável o Poder do Amor
- 2018: Seguir em Frente

==== Collections ====
- 1998: Grandes Sucessos
- 2000: Bailão do Rick &amp; Renner
- 2001: Os Gigantes
- 2001: Warner 25 Anos
- 2006: Warner 30 Anos
- 2007: Nova Série
- 2008: Essencial
- 2009: Tudo de Bom (Disco duplo)
- 2010: Nossa História – BOX 3 CDs

==== DVDs and live albums ====
- 2003: Acústico – 10 Anos de Sucesso
- 2005: Rick & Renner e Você...
- 2013: Bom de Dança – Vol. 2

=== Rick & Victor ===
==== Studio albums ====
- 2010 – Mais Que Pai e Filho
