= Caçador =

- Municipality
- Municipality of Caçador; Município de Caçador
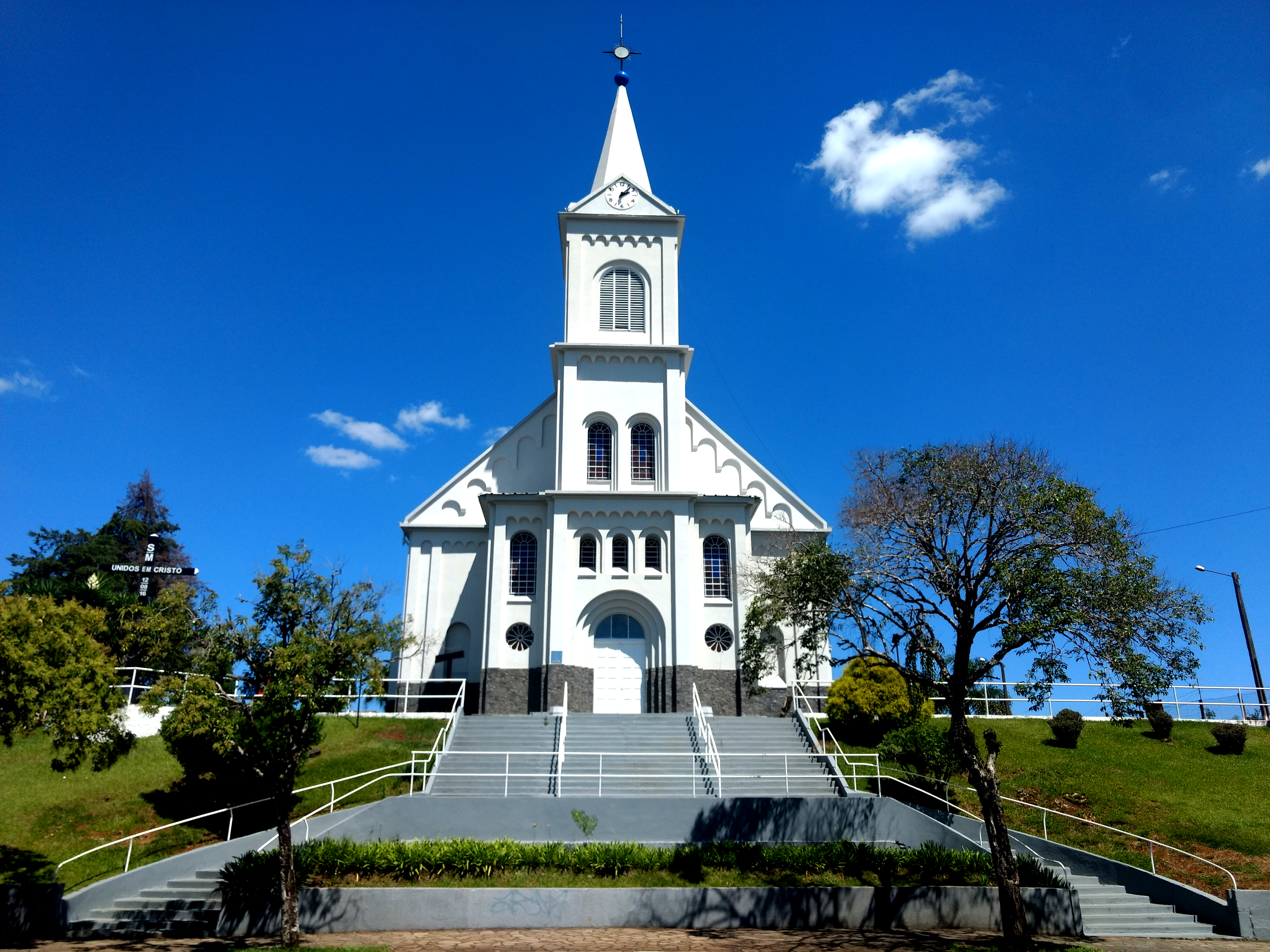
- São Francisco de Assis Cathedral

- Flag Coat of arms

- Location within the state of Santa Catarina

- Location within Brazil
- Coordinates: 26°46′30″S 51°00′54″W
- Country: Brazil
- Region: South
- State: Santa Catarina
- Mesoregion: Oeste Catarinense
- Microregion: Joaçaba
- Metropolitan area: Contestado Metropolitan Area
- Established: March 25, 1934

Government
  - Mayor: Saulo Sperotto (PSDB)

Area
  - Total: 984.285 km^{2} (380.035 sq mi)
- IBGE/2017
- Elevation: 920 m (3,020 ft)
- Highest elevation: 1,390 m (4,560 ft)
- Lowest elevation: 780 m (2,560 ft)

Population (2020)
  - Total: 79,313
  - Density: 80.579/km^{2} (208.70/sq mi)
- IBGE
- Time zone: UTC−3
  - Summer (DST): UTC-2
- Demonym: caçadorense

Caçador (Brazilian Portuguese pronunciation: [kasaˈdoʁ]) is a municipality in the state of Santa Catarina in the South region of Brazil.

== History ==
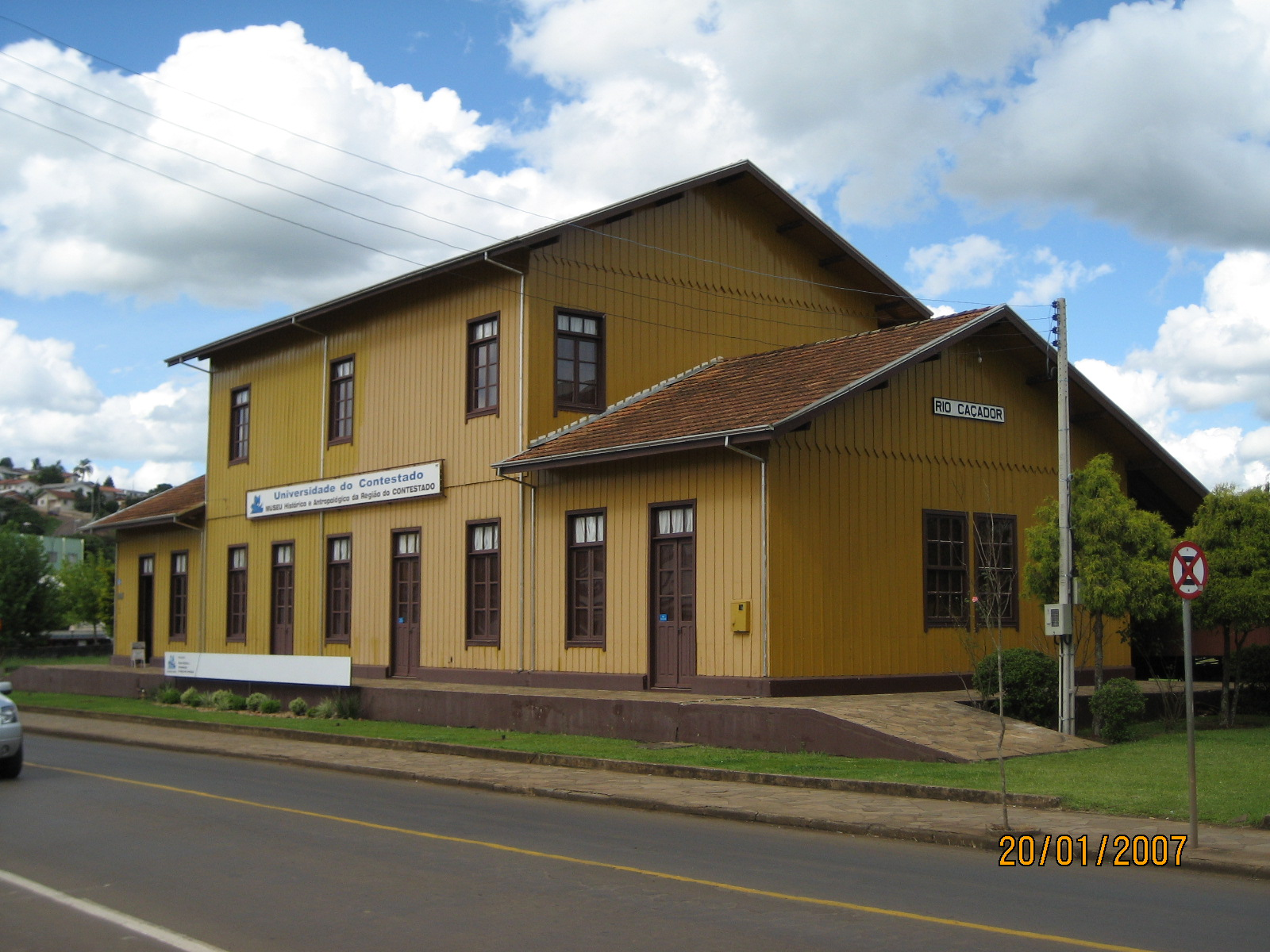
Contestado Museum. The building is a reconstruction of the "Rio Caçador" rail station.

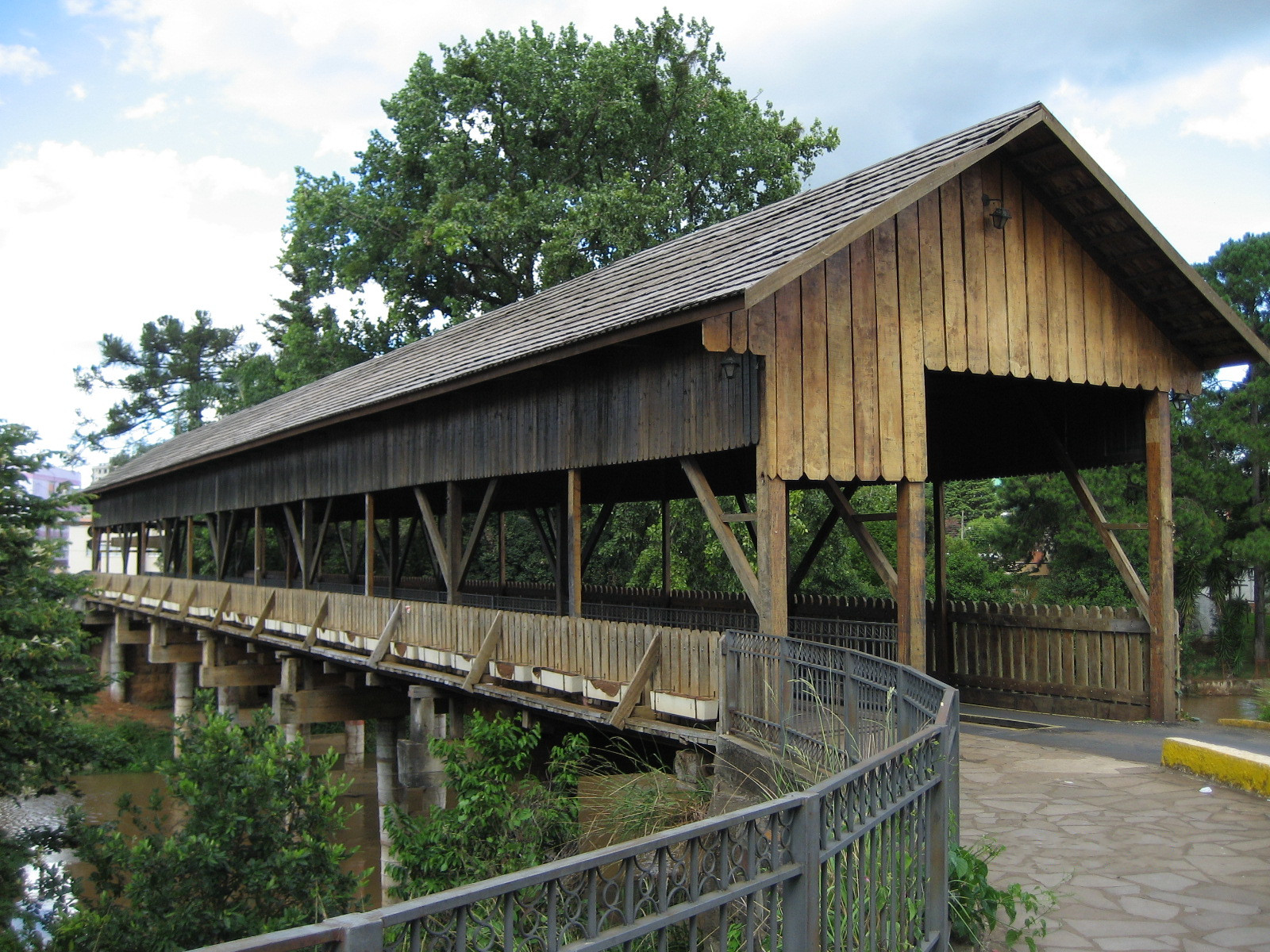
Bridge Antonio Bortolon.

The banks of the Rio do Peixe (Fish River) were inhabited by ethnic native groups of Kaingangs and Xoklengs until 1881, when families of European origin settled here and, because of the abundance of hunting, dubbed the place "Rio do Caçador" (Hunter River).

Francisco Correa de Mello, who came from Campos Novos and settled on the banks of Rio do Peixe, in 1881, is considered the first resident of Portuguese origin; he was followed in 1887 by Pedro Ribeiro, and in 1891, Tomaz Gonçalves Padilha, who settled on November 15.

With the construction of the railroad from São Paulo to Rio Grande do Sul from 1908 to 1910, the colonization intensified with an influx of Italian, German, Polish and Syrian-Lebanese immigrants . In 1910 the tracks reached Rio Caçador and attracted large numbers of immigrants of Italian origin, mainly from Rio Grande do Sul. With the settlement of the core of Rio das Antas, many Teutonic-Brazilian settlers from the coast of Santa Catarina were established in the municipality by the Brazilian Railway Company.

The town of Caçador is in the heart of the region where, from 1912 to 1916, there was the so-called Contestado War.

In 1918, the first post office was built, and there was already a state revenues post. The construction of the Road from Caçador to Curitibanos in 1933 spurred the development of the region. Rio Caçador, which was founded in 1923, came under the auspices of the municipal district of Campos Novos. In the administrative division report for the year 1933, Rio Caçador district was included in the municipality of Curitibanos.

Population growth and the lumber industry led to the creation of the municipality, established on March 25, 1934, and dis-enchartered the cities of Curitibanos, Campos Novos, Cruzeiro and Porto União.

Caçador's economy has been developed through the harvesting and processing of timber and reforestation. Agriculture emerged as a new option for generating foreign exchange, especially for fresh produce where Caçador is considered the largest producer of tomatoes in southern Brazil.

The name "Caçador" is derived from "Caçadores", a variety of Portuguese infantry created during the 17th century. "Caçadores" means "hunters" in Portuguese.

== Climate ==
The city has a temperate oceanic climate (Köppen climate classification Cfb), with an average annual temperature of 16.0 °C (60.8 °F), it has hot and humid summers with cold and dry winters. It is known for its below freezing temperatures during winter.

Caçador holds the record minimum temperature in Brazil; -14.0 °C (6.8 °F) on June 11, 1952. Another record, which is unofficial, of -17.8 °C (0 °F) in 1996 in Morro da Igreja, Urubici, also in Santa Catarina, would be the record minimum for Brazil.

During the months of May to September, frosts and occasional snowfalls may occur.

Climate data for Caçador, elevation 860 m (2,820 ft), (1976–2005)
Month	Jan	Feb	Mar	Apr	May	Jun	Jul	Aug	Sep	Oct	Nov	Dec	Year
Record high °C (°F)	35.0 (95.0)	33.4 (92.1)	31.6 (88.9)	30.2 (86.4)	28.6 (83.5)	28.0 (82.4)	27.6 (81.7)	31.4 (88.5)	32.2 (90.0)	32.2 (90.0)	36.2 (97.2)	34.2 (93.6)	36.2 (97.2)
Mean daily maximum °C (°F)	26.5 (79.7)	26.3 (79.3)	25.2 (77.4)	22.5 (72.5)	19.9 (67.8)	18.3 (64.9)	18.4 (65.1)	20.0 (68.0)	20.7 (69.3)	22.6 (72.7)	24.6 (76.3)	25.8 (78.4)	22.6 (72.6)
Daily mean °C (°F)	20.4 (68.7)	20.3 (68.5)	19.0 (66.2)	16.0 (60.8)	12.9 (55.2)	11.4 (52.5)	11.4 (52.5)	12.8 (55.0)	14.4 (57.9)	16.3 (61.3)	18.1 (64.6)	19.7 (67.5)	16.1 (60.9)
Mean daily minimum °C (°F)	15.7 (60.3)	15.9 (60.6)	14.5 (58.1)	11.4 (52.5)	7.8 (46.0)	6.5 (43.7)	6.5 (43.7)	7.6 (45.7)	9.6 (49.3)	11.6 (52.9)	12.9 (55.2)	14.8 (58.6)	11.2 (52.2)
Record low °C (°F)	4.0 (39.2)	2.5 (36.5)	8.0 (46.4)	−3.0 (26.6)	−5.8 (21.6)	−7.8 (18.0)	−7.0 (19.4)	−10.4 (13.3)	−7.0 (19.4)	−2.0 (28.4)	−1.8 (28.8)	1.6 (34.9)	−10.4 (13.3)
Average precipitation mm (inches)	199.0 (7.83)	178.0 (7.01)	124.0 (4.88)	91.0 (3.58)	107.0 (4.21)	113.0 (4.45)	95.0 (3.74)	188.0 (7.40)	158.0 (6.22)	175.0 (6.89)	131.0 (5.16)	167.0 (6.57)	1,726 (67.94)
Average relative humidity (%)	78	80	81	80	81	81	79	77	77	76	73	75	78
Mean monthly sunshine hours	193	166	176	194	175	150	170	174	143	171	198	198	2,108
Source 1: Empresa Brasileira de Pesquisa Agropecuária (EMBRAPA)
Source 2: Climatempo (precipitation)

== See also ==
- List of municipalities in Santa Catarina
