= Serra do Rio do Rastro =

Mountain range in Santa Catarina, Brazil

Coordinates: 28°24′26″S 49°32′46″W

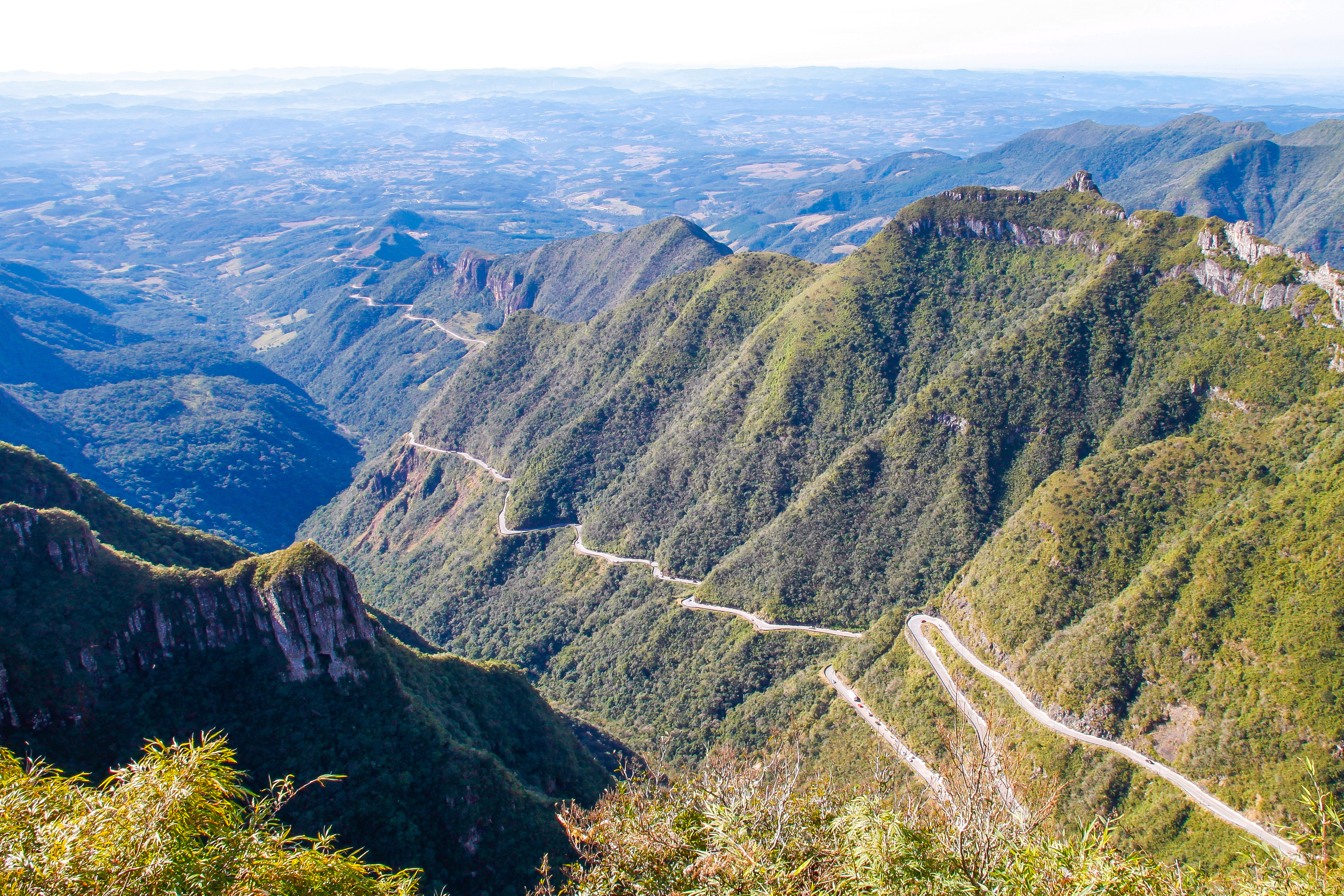
Road SC-390 in Serra do Rio do Rastro

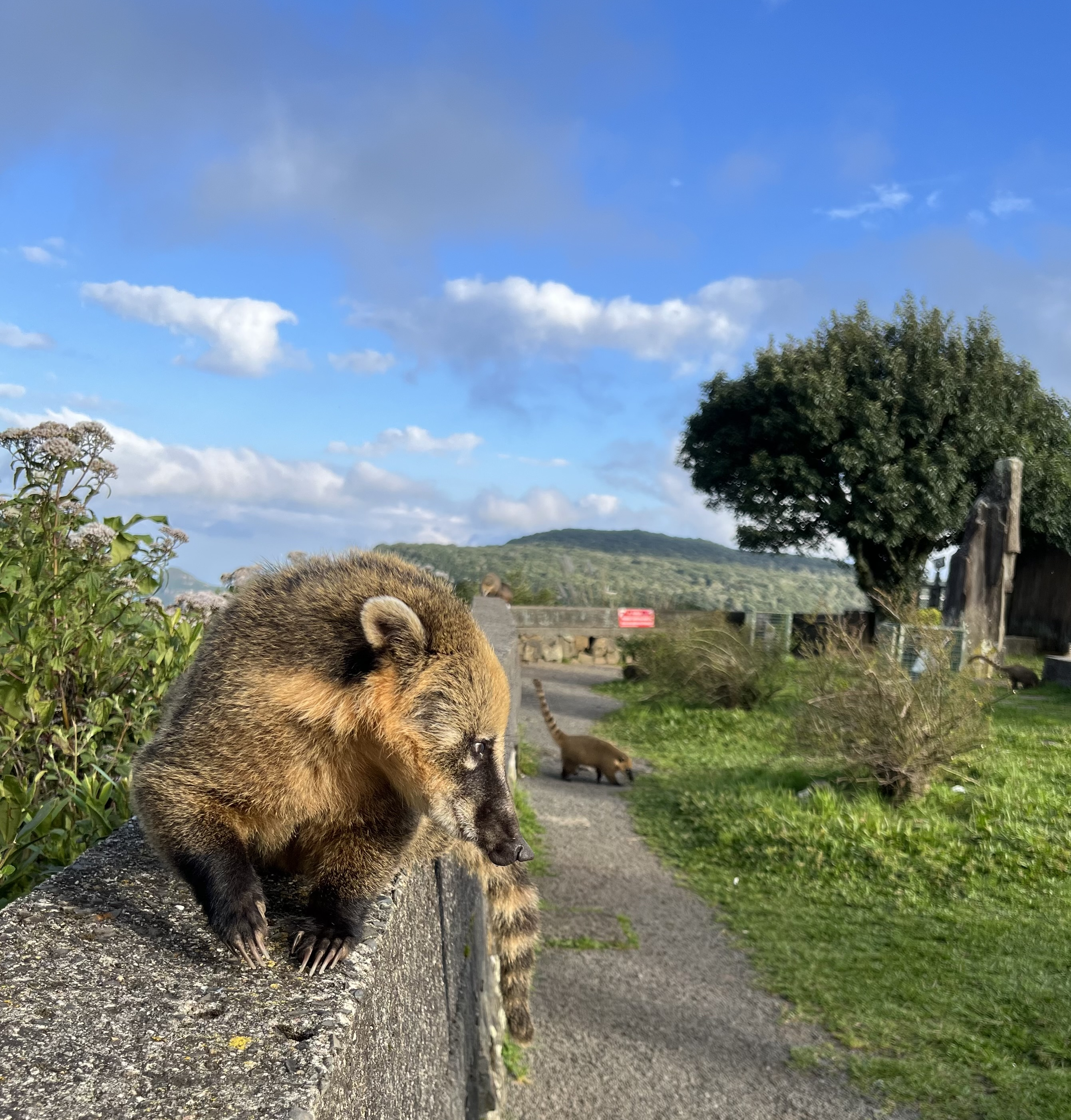
Coati at the peak of Serra do Rio do Rastro

Serra do Rio do Rastro (Brazilian Portuguese pronunciation: [ˈsɛʁɐ du ˈʁi.u du ˈʁastɾu], lit. 'Mountain Range of the River of the Track') is a mountain range located in the southeast of the state of Santa Catarina, Southern Brazil. It is crossed by the road SC-390, with remarkable landscapes and deep cliffs.

This mountain range is situated between the municipalities of Lauro Müller and Bom Jardim da Serra, and its highest point is situated at 1,460 metres (4,790 feet) above sea level. In the highest areas of this place, the Atlantic Ocean, located about 100 km (62 mi) away, can be spotted on clear days. Frosts are common and snowfalls can occur in the highest areas.

== See also ==
- Morro da Boa Vista
- Morro da Igreja
- Pedra Furada (Santa Catarina)
- Rio do Rasto Formation
