= Vinícius Lopes (footballer, born 1999) =

Brazilian footballer

Personal information
- Full name: Vinícius Lopes da Silva
- Date of birth: 7 May 1999 (age 27)
- Place of birth: Monte do Carmo, Brazil
- Height: 1.80 m (5 ft 11 in)
- Position: Winger

Team information
- Current team: Santa Clara
- Number: 70

Youth career
- 2016–2019: Goiás

Senior career*
Years	Team	Apps	(Gls)
2019–2021	Goiás	39	(6)
2022–2024	Botafogo	16	(2)
2022–2023	→ RWDM Brussels (loan)	16	(0)
2023–2024	→ Santa Clara (loan)	28	(3)
2024–	Santa Clara	65	(15)
- * Club domestic league appearances and goals as of 20 September 2026

Vinícius Lopes da Silva (born 7 May 1999) is a Brazilian professional footballer who plays as a winger for Primeira Liga club Santa Clara.

== Professional career ==
Lopes joined the youth academy of Goiás in 2016, which was 836 km away from his hometown Monte do Carmo. Lopes made his professional debut with Goiás in a 2–2 Campeonato Brasileiro Série A tie with Chapecoense on 20 October 2019.

== Career statistics ==
As of match played 20 September 2026

Appearances and goals by club, season and competition
Club	Season	League			State league		National cup (Note: Includes Copa do Brasil, Taça de Portugal)		League Cup		Continental		Total	
Club	Season	Division	Apps	Goals	Apps	Goals	Apps	Goals	Apps	Goals	Apps	Goals	Apps	Goals
Goiás	2019	Série A	5	0	0	0	0	0	—		—		5	0
Goiás	2020	Série A	28	6	8	0	1	0	—		2 (Note: Appearances in Copa Sudamericana)	0	37	6
Goiás	2021	Série B	6	0	11	5	1	0	—		—		18	5
Goiás	Total		39	6	19	5	2	0	—		2	0	60	11
Botafogo	2022	Série A	16	2	2	0	2	0	—		—		20	2
RWDM Brussels (loan)	2022–23	Challenger Pro League	16	0	—		2	1	—		—		18	1
Santa Clara (loan)	2023–24	Liga Portugal 2	28	3	—		5	0	1	0	—		34	3
Santa Clara	2024–25	Primeira Liga	33	8	—		3	0	1	0	—		37	8
Santa Clara	2025–26	Primeira Liga	25	6	—		2	1	1	0	6 (Note: Appearances in UEFA Conference League)	2	34	9
Santa Clara	2026–27	Primeira Liga	7	1	—		0	0	0	0	—		7	1
Santa Clara	Total		65	15	—		5	1	2	0	6	2	78	18
Career total			164	26	21	5	16	2	3	0	8	2	210	35
