= Bell 430 =

Light-medium utility helicopter

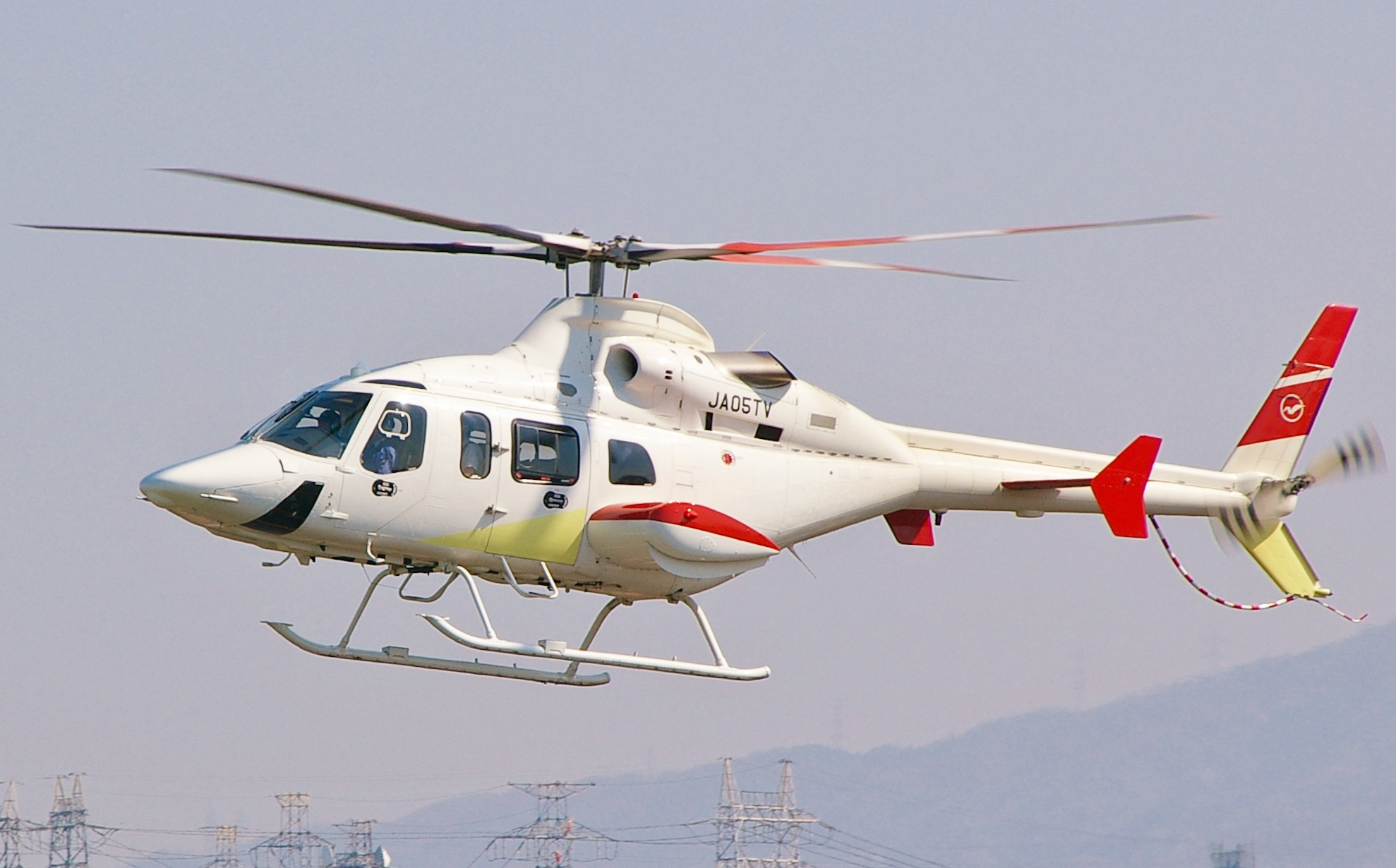
- Nakanihon Air Service's Bell 430 with landing skids

General information
- Type: Executive/utility helicopter
- National origin: United States
- Manufacturer: Bell Helicopter Textron
- Number built: 136

History
- Manufactured: 1996–2008
- Introduction date: 1995
- First flight: October 25, 1994
- Developed from: Bell 222/230

The Bell 430 is an American/Canadian twin-engine light-medium helicopter built by Bell Helicopter. It is a stretched and more powerful development of the Bell 230, which, in turn, was based on the earlier Bell 222.

== Development ==
While developing the reengined Model 222 as the 230, Bell began preliminary design work on a stretched derivative with a four-bladed main rotor in 1991. The Bell 430 was formally launched in February 1992, with two prototypes modified from Bell 230s. The first of these flew in its new configuration on October 25, 1994, and the second prototype, featuring the full 430 avionics suite, first flew on December 19, 1994.

Production of the Bell 230 ended in August 1995, and 430 production began. The first 430 production aircraft was completed later that year. Canadian certification was awarded on February 23, 1996. Deliveries began in mid-1996.

On January 24, 2008, Bell announced plans to terminate production of its Model 430 after order commitments were fulfilled in 2008. Production ended after 136 helicopters were completed, with the last being delivered in May 2008.

== Design ==
The Bell 430 features several significant improvements over the 230, the most significant of these being the new four-blade, bearingless, composite main rotor. Although both the 230 and 430 are powered by Rolls-Royce (Allison) 250 turboshaft engines, the 430's engines are 10% more powerful. Other changes include the 1 ft 6 in (46 cm) stretched fuselage, providing for two extra seats, an optional EFIS flight deck, and a choice of either skids or retractable wheeled undercarriage.

The typical configuration seats ten, including a pilot and co-pilot with eight passengers in the main cabin behind them in three rows of seats. Six- and eight-place executive layouts are offered. In an EMS role it can carry one or two stretcher patients with four or three medical attendants, respectively. Maximum external load capacity is 3,500 pounds (1,600 kg).

== Operational history ==
The Bell 430 entered service in 1996, with thirteen delivered that year. In 1998, some 50 Bell 430s were in service with 9,000 flight hours totaled.

On September 3, 1996, Americans Ron Bower and John Williams broke the round-the-world helicopter record with the second Bell 430, flying westwards from the UK with a time of 17 days, 6 hours and 14 minutes.

== Operators ==
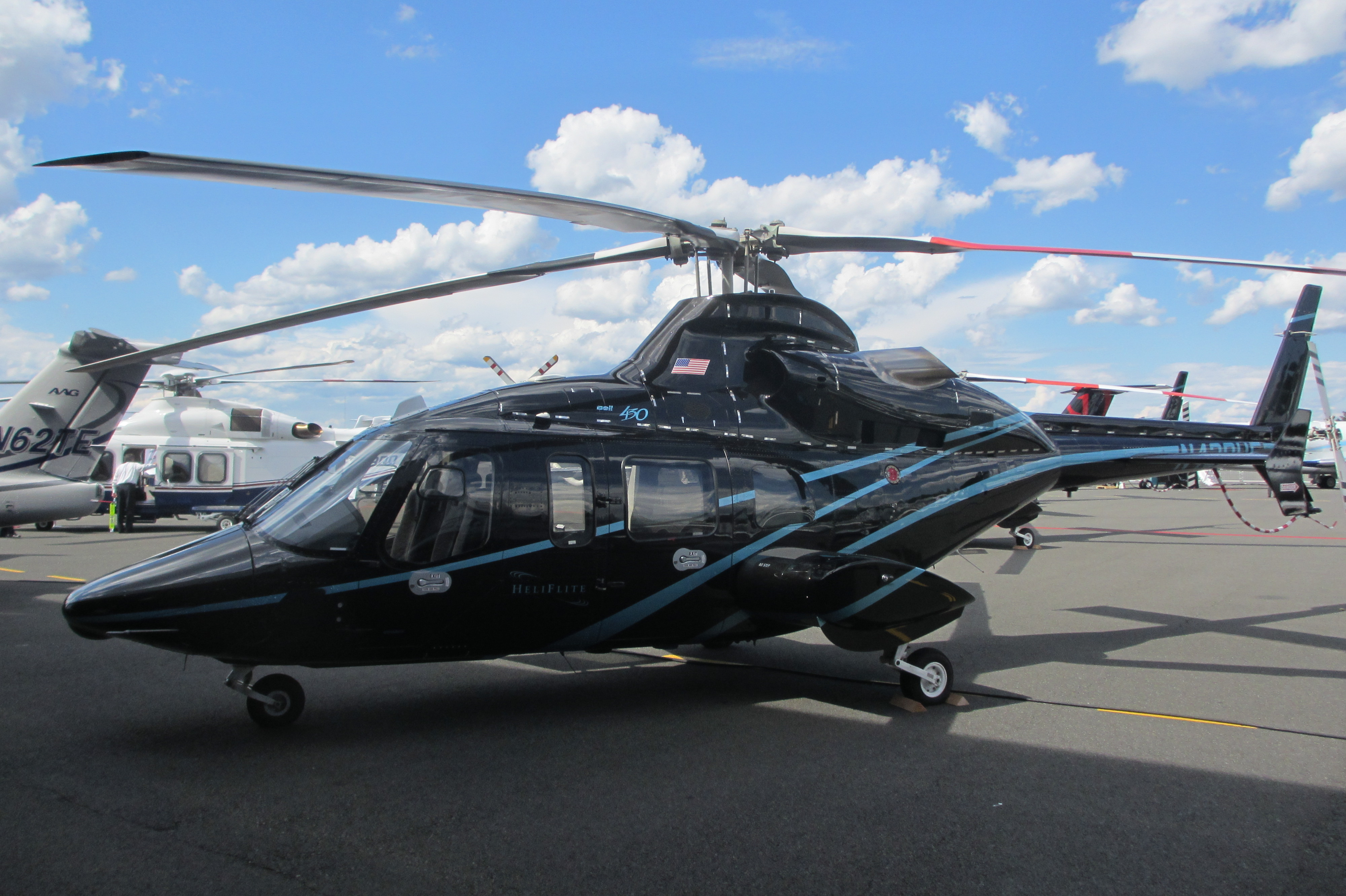
Bell 430

=== Military ===
Bulgaria

- Bulgarian Air Force

Dominican Republic

- Dominican Republic Air Force

Ecuador

- Ecuadorian Navy

=== Civilian ===
Indonesia

- Pelita Air

United States

- AirMed
- New York State Police.
- Lee County EMS
- GrandView Aviation
- Louisiana State Police
- Uber Elevate

== Accidents ==
On September 2, 2009, an Andhra Govt. Bell 430 carrying Chief Minister Y. S. Rajasekhara Reddy and his party from Andhra Pradesh in southern India went missing over a local stretch of forest. The charred wreckage was found the next morning, crashed on a hilltop in the Nallamala Hills this resulted in five fatalities.

On 21 September 2026, a private Bell 430 helicopter with registration PP-MGR, carrying the Brazilian singer and songwriter Rick Sollo, former member of the duo Rick & Renner, crashed during a flight between Porto Belo and São Joaquim in Santa Catarina. This resulted in five fatalities.

On 30 September 2026, a Bell 430 carrying Zimbabwean businessman Wicknell Chivayo crashed in Marondera, Zimbabwe, resulting in five casualties.

== Specifications ==

Bell 230 and Bell 430 comparison
Model	230	430
Announced	1990	1991
First Flight	August 12, 1991	October 25, 1994
Certified	March 1992	February 23, 1996
Delivered	November 1992	1996
Seats	2 (pilot & copilot) + 5–6 passengers	2 + 6–8
Height	11 ft 8 in (3.56 m)	12 ft 3 in (3.73 m)
Fuselage length	42 ft 3 in (12.88 m)	44 ft 1 in (13.44 m)
Rotor diameter	42 ft (13 m)	
Length overall	50 ft 3 in (15.32 m)	
Engine (2×)	Allison 250C30G2	Rolls-Royce 250-C40B
Power (2×)	700 hp (520 kW)	783 hp (584 kW)
Max. speed	140 knots (160 mph; 260 km/h)	140 knots (160 mph; 260 km/h)
Climb rate	1,600 ft/min (8.13 m/s)	1,350 ft/min (6.86 m/s)
Service ceiling	15,500 ft (4,700 m)	14,600 ft (4,500 m)
Hover ceiling	12,400 ft (3,800 m)	11,350 ft (3,460 m)
Fuel capacity	188+ US gal (710+ L)	188+ US gal (710+ L)
Range	378 nmi (435 mi; 700 km)	324 nmi (373 mi; 600 km)
Empty Weight	5,097 pounds (2,312 kg)	5,305 pounds (2,406 kg)
Maximum Takeoff Weight	8,400 pounds (3,800 kg)	9,300 pounds (4,200 kg)
Serial Numbers	23001–23038	49001–49123+

Sources: Airliners.net, helicopterdirect.com, AircraftOne.com

== See also ==
Related development

- Bell 222/230

Aircraft of comparable role, configuration, and era

- AgustaWestland AW109
- Eurocopter AS365 Dauphin
- Sikorsky S-76
