= Pedra Furada (Santa Catarina) =

Naturally formed rock arch in Brazil

Coordinates: 28°08′02.49″S 49°28′45.65″W

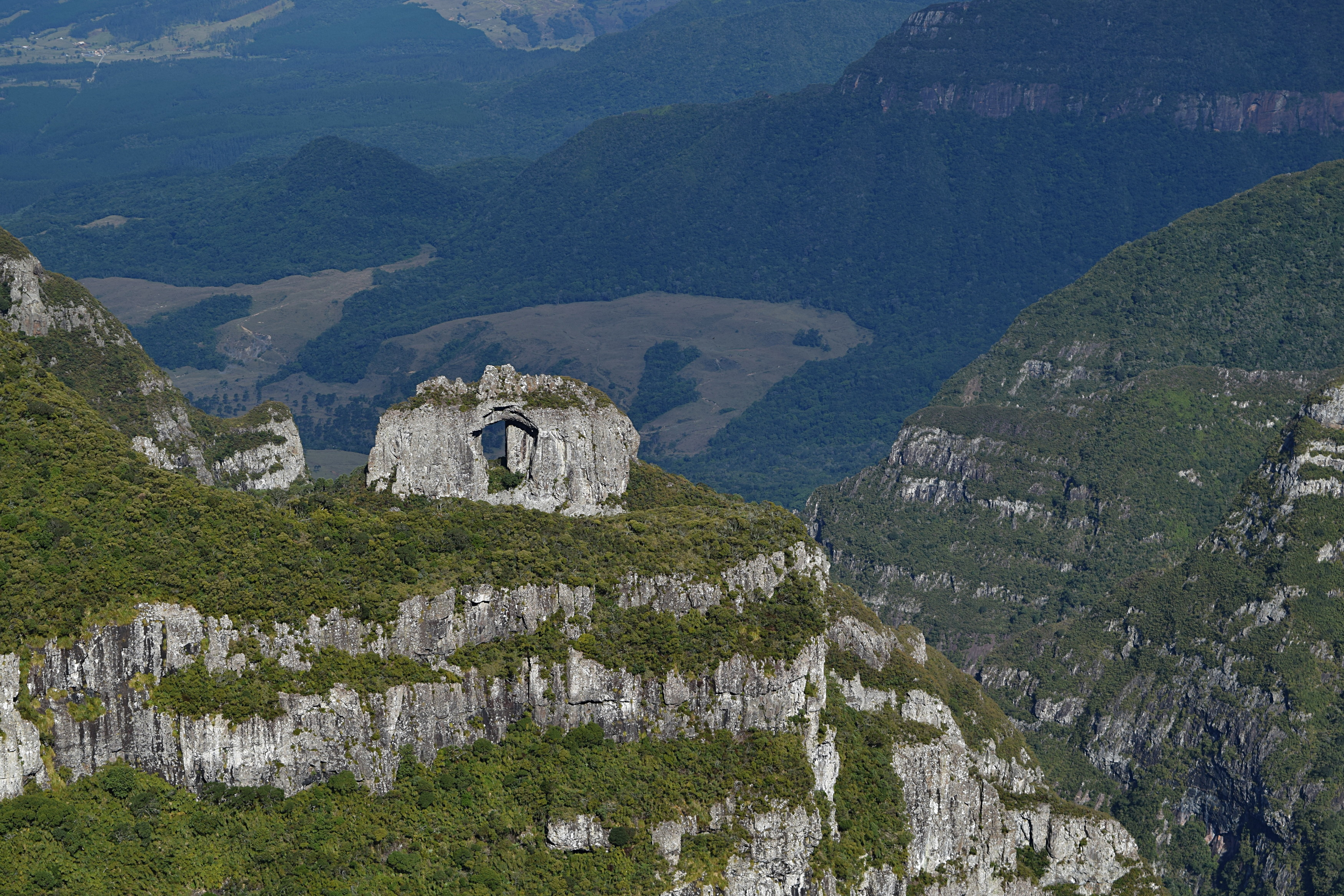
Pedra Furada, a stone photographed from the summit of Morro da Igreja.

Pedra Furada (Portuguese pronunciation: [ˈpɛdɾɐ fuˈɾadɐ], literally Drilled Stone) is a naturally formed rock arch located in the municipality of Urubici, state of Santa Catarina, Southern Brazil.

It can be spotted from the summit of a mountain named Morro da Igreja.
