= BRA =

The initials BRA may refer to:

== Military ==
- Bougainville Revolutionary Army, a Papua New Guinea revolutionary army
- Brigadier, Royal Artillery, in a Commonwealth army division

== Organizations ==
- Boston Redevelopment Authority, an American planning agency
- BRA Transportes Aéreos, a former Brazilian airline
- BRA Braathens Regional Airlines, a Swedish airline
- British Records Association, for historic records and archives
- Brå, Brottsförebyggande rådet, the Swedish National Council for Crime Prevention

== Codes ==
- Brazil (ISO 3166-1 alpha-3 code)
- Barreiras Airport (IATA code), in Brazil
- Union Station (Brattleboro, Vermont), US, Amtrak station code

== Other uses ==
- Belfast Royal Academy, Northern Ireland, a school
- Bentley Rhythm Ace, an English band
- Bilateral renal agenesis, a fetal medical condition
- Breast Reconstruction Awareness Day or No Bra Day

== See also ==
- Bra (disambiguation)
