= Bra (disambiguation) =

A bra is a woman's undergarment designed to support the breasts.

Bra may also refer to:

== Places ==
- Bra, a district of Lierneux, Belgium
- Bra, Piedmont, a comune in the Province of Cuneo, Piedmont, Italy
- Piazza Bra, a piazza in Verona, Veneto, Italy

== People ==
- Lemuel de Bra (1884–1954), American short story writer

== Other uses ==
- Bra, part of bra–ket notation in quantum physics
- Braj Bhasha a Western Hindi language by ISO 639-2 and ISO 639-3 code
- Front-end bra, a cover over the front part of a vehicle
- Male bra or compression bra, a brassiere for men
- Bra (Dragon Ball), a character in the Dragon Ball manga
- Brottsförebyggande rådet (Brå; the Swedish National Council for Crime Prevention)
- AC Bra, an Italian association football club

== See also ==
- Bra cheese, a style of cheese from the Italian comune Bra
- Bra sausage, a style of sausage from the Italian comune Bra
- BRA (disambiguation)
