= Rick & Renner =

Brazilian musical duo

Background information
- Born: Geraldo Antônio de Carvalho Ivair dos Reis Gonçalves
- Origin: Brasília, Brazil
- Genre: Sertanejo
- Years active: 1986–2010, 2012–2015, 2018–2026
- Labels: Warner Music Brasil (1993–2010); Radar Records (2012–2015; 2018–2026)
- Past members: Renner Reis (Ivair dos Reis Gonçalves); Rick Sollo (Geraldo Antônio de Carvalho)
- Website: http://rickerenneroficial.com.br/

Rick & Renner was a Brazilian musical duo of sertanejo music formed in 1986 by singers and composers Geraldo Antônio de Carvalho, aka Rick (Monte do Carmo, 5 December 1966 – 21 September 2026) and Ivair dos Reis Gonçalves, aka Renner (Patos de Minas, 19 November 1971).

As of November 2024, they had sold over 15 million records. It is estimated that they had performed for around 225 million people throughout their career, with an average of 15,000 audience members per show.

Rick's death, caused by a helicopter accident in the early morning hours of 21 September 2026, led to the group ceasing activity permanently.

== History ==
Having wanted to pursue music because of his father, Rick had a hard time finding a musical partner in the beginning of his career. When he was a child, he formed a duo with his sister, and they performed at various nightclubs under the name Sereno & Serenata. However, when Rick was about 12 or 13, their father forbade Rick's sister from performing at night. Rick's first encounter with Renner was over the phone; Rick heard Renner's singing in the background of went from partner to partner until the day he went to Brasília for a show and needed to call a nightclub to borrow some equipment and, while waiting on the line, he heard Renner singing in the background and wanted to meet him.

They started their career as Rick & Renner in 1986. The two singers had very different musical influences — Rick grew up listening to popular songs sung by his father in the fairs of Tocantins and on the radio stations of Goiás, while Renner enjoyed the chords and lyrics of Legião Urbana, Capital Inicial and Os Paralamas do Sucesso — which gave their music a unique sound. In the beginning of their career, they performed in nightclubs. It wasn't until 1991 that they released their first independent CD. Zezé Di Camargo & Luciano, who attended one of their shows, introduced them to the Continental East West recording company, which today belongs to the multinational Warner Music Brasil, where the duo's first official album was recorded in 1992.

In 1998, the duo released the song "Ela é Demais", which stayed for five consecutive months in the charts and is considered one of the greatest hits of sertanejo music. "Ela é Demais" gained the duo fame and recognition. All of the duo's CDs, except for the second, were produced by Manoel Nenzinho Pinto, the duo's producer and manager. Some of their most well-known songs include "Ela é Demais", "Cara de Pau", "Muleca", "Fim de Semana", "Seguir em Frente", "O Amor e Eu", "Filha", "Só Pensando Em Você", "Eu Sem Você", "Nos Bares da Cidade", "Eu Mereço", "Bebedeira", and "Nóis Tropica, Mas Não Cai".

=== The separation ===
In early 2010, rumors that the duo might split up started to spread. This happened for many reasons, from the release of a parallel work of Rick Sollo with his son Victor Henrique, to Renner's candidacy for the Senate in Goiás. Renner's absence from events to promote the work ironically titled Happy End, which featured Frejat in the album's namesake song, confirmed the separation rumors. The official announcement of the duo's separation was made on 1 January 2011, at their last show, which took place in Gaspar, Santa Catarina. A few days after the announcement, Rick adopted the artistic name Rick Sollo, signed with Talismã Music, and released three new songs on the internet. Renner also started a solo career, under the stage name Renner Reis.

=== The return of the duo ===
After almost two years apart, Rick & Renner announced on 24 September 2012 that they would be performing together again. In the same year, they released the CD Inacreditável o Poder do Amor by Radar Records, produced by Rick. On 20 February 2013, the duo recoded their third DVD in the Via Marquês concert hall in São Paulo. The DVD included special appearances by Eduardo Costa, Rionegro & Solimões, Léo Maia and Pablo.

=== New separation ===
On 5 January 2015, Rick announced again, via Instagram, the end of the duo, following a car accident involving an intoxicated Renner. Rick stated that he "lost count of how many times [he] sat down with [Renner] to give advice and fix mistakes...". After the separation, Rick returned to a solo career and released the album Foi Deus, with special appearances by Gusttavo Lima, Daniel, Rionegro & Solimões, Chitãozinho & Xororó, Bonni & Belucco, Marciano and Father Fábio de Melo. In 2017, he formed a duo with singer Giovani, from the defunct duo Gian & Giovani, called Rick & Giovani, with the project Dois Corações, which lasted until the end of 2018. Renner also formed another duo, called Renner & Rennan, after abandoning his gospel career.

=== New return of the duo ===
In June 2018, rumors surfaced that the duo might make a return. However, until August 2018, no official statements confirming or denying these rumors were made by Rick, Renner, or their management. On 12 August 2018, Rick and Renner officially announced the duo's return on Domingão do Faustão, promoting the Seguir em Frente Tour, a two-year tour featuring several cities in Brazil and abroad. "We've reconsidered coming back thanks to the affection we've received from our fans, supporting us in this journey. For sure it will be a project that will have a lot of love involved and of course, serious commitment," Rick explained. The project resulted in a CD with 17 re-recorded tracks with an acoustic version, with Rick & Renner's greatest hits and a new song: "Como Assim", written by Rick. Among the classics are "Ela É Demais", "Nos Bares da Cidade", "Filha", "Só Pensando em Você". "This approach has done well for us, because there are no hard feelings. We are united and together. I can't wait to feel the affection of the public again. And [sic] hit the road with my partner", Renner completed. Rick & Renner's return would be a 2-year project, called Seguir em Frente (English: Moving Forward). The project was managed by Vibe Promoções Artísticas.

== Accident involving Renner ==
The accident happened around 9 a.m. on August 20, 2001, on state highway Luís de Queirós (SP-304), which connects Americana to Piracicaba, at km 144. Renner was on his way to Piracicaba to promote the duo's work in countryside radio stations and meet up with Rick Sollo, who was already in the city. According to the Federal Highway Police, Renner's car, a BMW 328i, overtook a motorcycle coming in the opposite direction. The two occupants of the motorcycle, Eveline Soares Rossi, 31, and Luís Antonio Nunes Acetto, 35, died on the spot. Renner and his secretary were admitted to the Municipal Hospital of Santa Bárbara d'Oeste. Renner broke some teeth and suffered minor fractures.

=== Conviction ===
Renner Reis was found guilty of manslaughter (unintentional), but his penalty of 2 years and 8 months in prison was converted to 2,000 minimum wages (R$1,874,000.00 at today's value) to the family of the victims and community service. The decision, available on the website of the Superior Court of Justice, on Friday (April 30, 2010), put an end to the legal battle waged since 2002 between the family of Luis Antonio Nunes Acetto and the singer Renner Reis. The decision confirms the first instance sentence that condemned Renner to pay compensation for material and hedonic damages at very relevant levels. Renner was sentenced to pay 2 thousand minimum wages plus 1% interest per month. The outcome of the case, besides being a response to the victim's family, is legally an innovation of the Judiciary regarding the level of compensation for violent death by carelessness in traffic. Given the violence of the accident, the public exposure of the family's grief and suffering, and Renner's conduct after the accident, the compensation was fixed at an amount four times higher than the value established by the current common law of the Courts. After the expert examination, it was found that, at the moment of impact, the car driven by Renner was traveling at a speed of almost 100 miles per hour. Although he has already been summoned to pay, Renner has not yet expressed the possibility of spontaneously complying with the decision.

== Death of Rick Sollo ==
Rick Sollo went missing on 21 September 2026 when the helicopter he was travelling on disappeared in the state of Santa Catarina. According to the Brazilian Air Force (FAB), the aircraft took off from Porto Belo bound for São Joaquim, but never reached its destination. Authorities immediately launched a search and rescue operation involving helicopters, a specialized aircraft, drones, and ground teams. On 22 September 2026, a crew from the Santa Catarina fire department located the helicopter crash site and found the dead bodies of all its occupants, which included Rick, businessman and speaker Bruno Avelar, and the helicopter's pilot.

== Renner in politics ==
In 2010 Renner ran for senator of Goiás for the Progressive Party (PP), a position for which he was invited to run by the former governor of the state, Alcides Rodrigues (PP). He was part of the Goiás on the Right Track coalition, led by then candidate for governor Vanderlan Cardoso (PR). A few weeks before the elections, Renner gave up his candidacy for personal reasons. Even though he dropped out, Renner received 76,410 votes.

== Discography ==
- (1992) Rick & Renner
- (1994) Rick & Renner - Vol. 2
- (1995) Rick & Renner - Volume III
- (1997) Rick & Renner - Vol. 4
- (1998) Mil Vezes Cantarei
- (1999) Instante Mágico
- (2000) Seguir em Frente
- (2001) É Dez, é Cem, é Mil
- (2002) Só Pensando em Você
- (2003) 10 Anos de Sucesso - Acústico (also released on DVD)
- (2004) Só Nós Dois
- (2005) Rick & Renner e Você... (also released on DVD)
- (2006) Bom de Dança
- (2007) Coisa de Deus
- (2008) Passe o Tempo que Passar
- (2010) Happy End
- (2012) Inacreditável o Poder do Amor
- (2013) Bom de Dança - Vol. 2 (also released on DVD)
- (2018) Seguir em Frente

== Curiosities ==
- Rick was the great responsible for putting back the duo Gino & Geno in the success charts.
- Rick, besides being a singer, was also a great composer, having several compositions recorded by important names of the Brazilian music as: Chitãozinho & Xororó, Milionário & José Rico, Daniel, João Paulo & Daniel, Leandro & Leonardo, Bruno & Marrone, Zezé Di Camargo & Luciano and Gian & Giovani.
- Renner has dated TV presenters Amanda Françozo and Helen Ganzarolli.

== See also ==
- List of best-selling albums in Brazil
- Sertanejo music
