= BRA Transportes Aéreos =

Brazilian airline

BRA Transportes Aéreos (Brasil Rodo Aéreo)
IATA	ICAO	Call sign
B7	BRB	BRA-TRANSPAEREOS
- Founded: 1999
- Ceased operations: 7 November 2007
- Hubs: São Paulo–Congonhas; São Paulo–Guarulhos
- Headquarters: São Paulo, Brazil
- Key people: Humberto Folegatti (CEO)
- Website: www.voebra.com.br

BRA Transportes Aéreos S/A was a Brazilian low-fare airline based in São Paulo, Brazil, which used to operate both domestic and international scheduled services, as well as charter flights. Its main base was São Paulo/Guarulhos International Airport. BRA was the third largest airline in Brazil with 4.19% of the domestic Brazilian market as of August 2006.

== History ==
In July 2007 BRA, started a code-share agreement with OceanAir, substantially increasing their domestic destinations. On 6 November 2007, BRA announced that it would suspend all of its flights starting on 7 November and leave all of its 1,000+ employees under mandatory notice of termination of employment.

In 2009, the airline was back in operations with charter flights with a solo Boeing 737-300 ex-Gol Linhas Aéreas, but it was sold to Puma Air, a Brazilian airline that started operating jets in 2010. On June 18, 2009, BRA had its authorization to operate non-regular passenger flights renewed for one year by the Brazilian Civil Aviation Agency (ANAC). Therefore, BRA operated flights on behalf of other airlines or parties, as contracted.

== Destinations ==
BRA Transportes Aéreos operated only non-regular passenger services on behalf of other airlines or parties, as contracted.

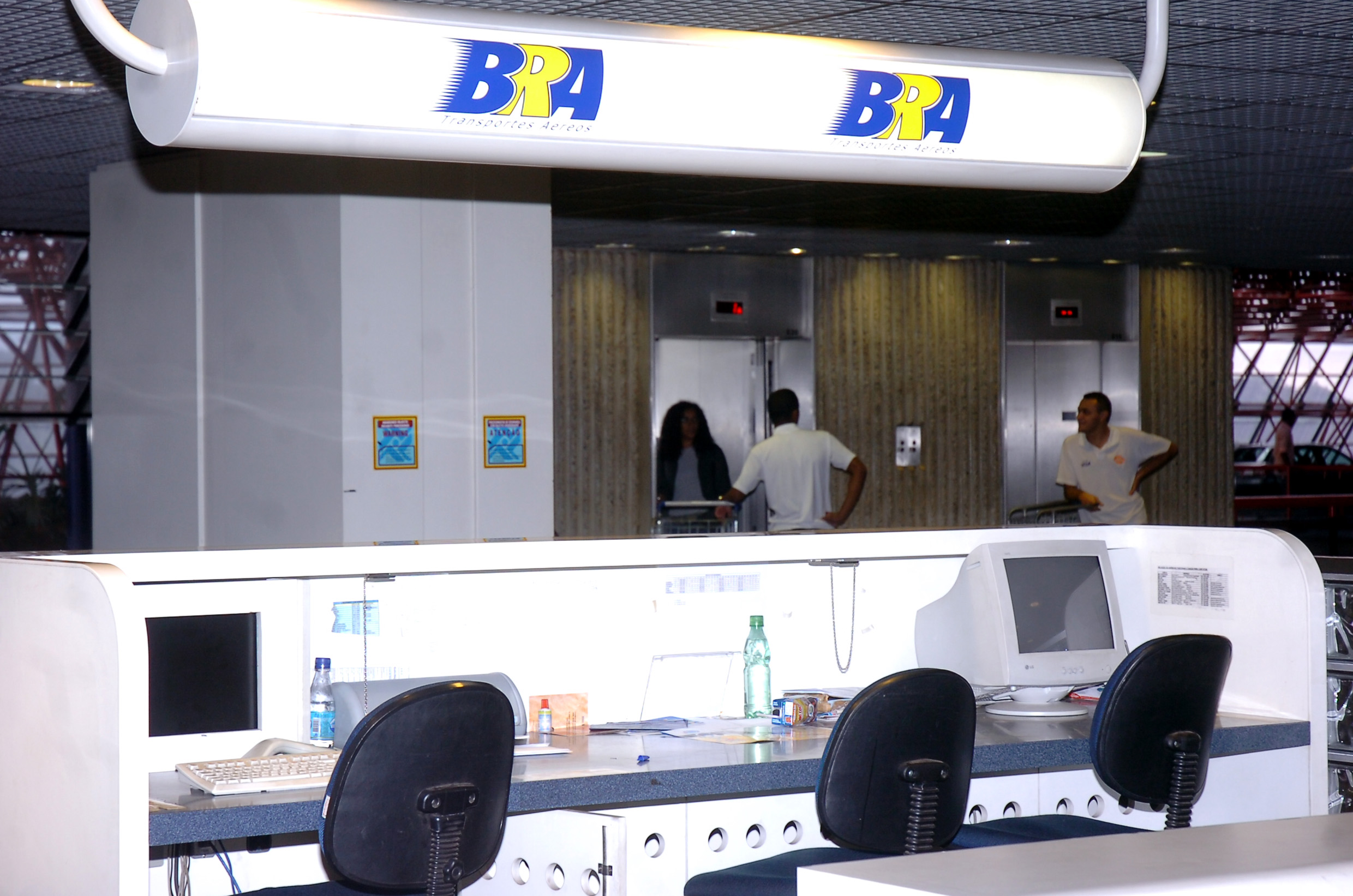
BRA ticket office at Brasília International Airport

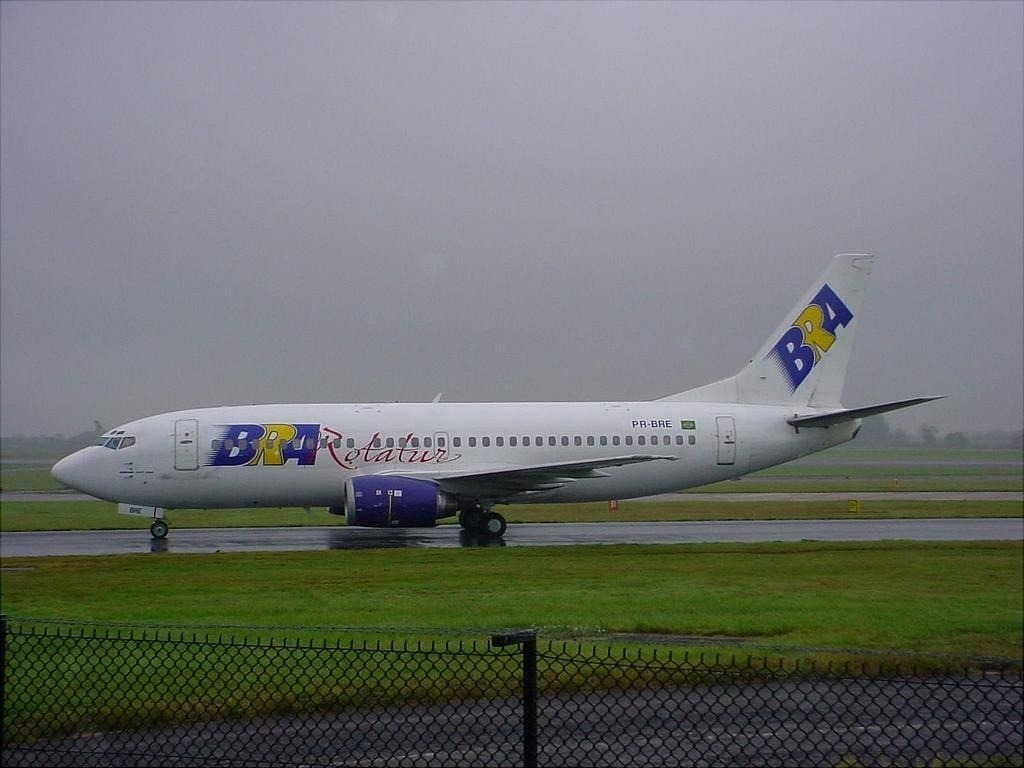
BRA Boeing 737-300 (2003)

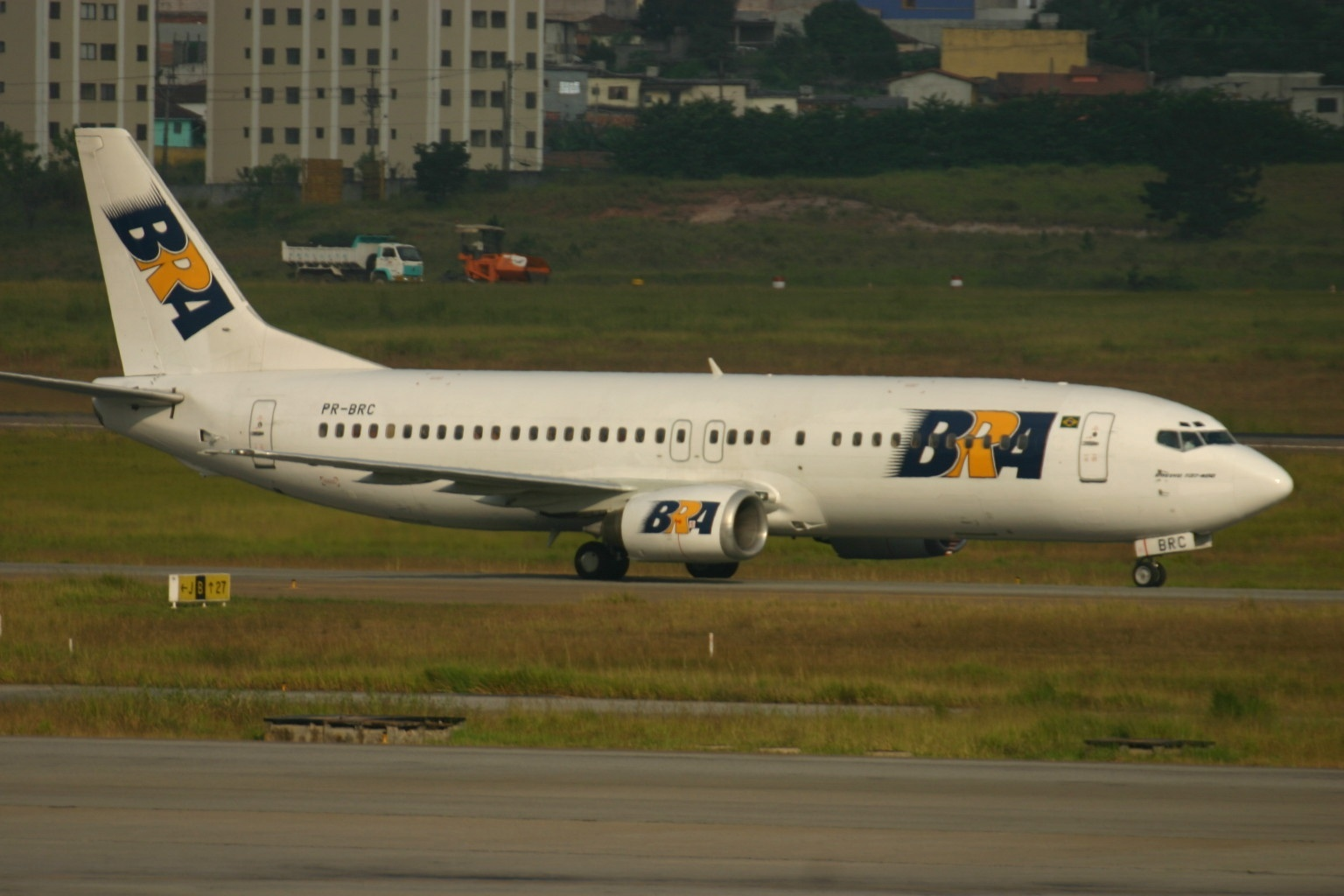
BRA Boeing 737-400 (2012)

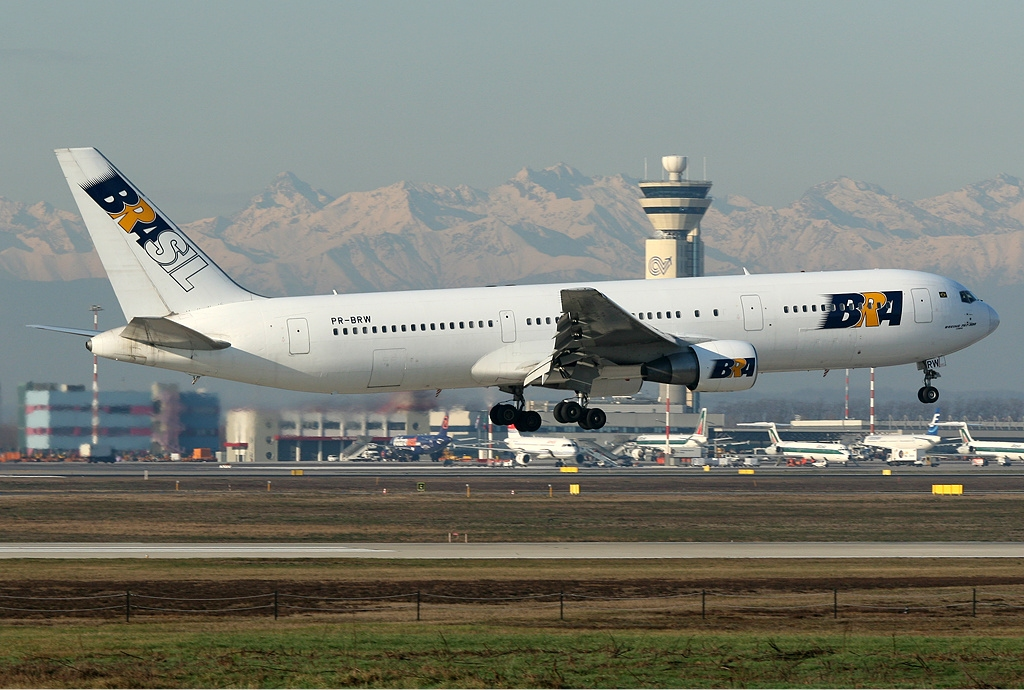
BRA Boeing 767-300ER (2006)

=== Domestic ===
Previously, BRA operated services to the following scheduled domestic destinations (destinations – IATA/ICAO codes):

- Aracaju – AJU/SBAR
- Belém – BEL/SBBE
- Belo Horizonte (Confins International Airport – CNF/SBCF and Pampulha Airport – PLU/SBBH)
- Brasília – BSB/SBBR
- Caldas Novas – CLV/SWKN
- Campina Grande – CPV/SBKG
- Campo Grande – CPG/SBCG
- Caruaru – CAU
- Cuiabá – CGB
- Curitiba – CWB/SBCT
- Fernando de Noronha – FEN/SBFN
- Florianópolis – FLN/SBFL
- Fortaleza – FOR/SBFZ
- Goiânia – GYN/SBGO
- João Pessoa – JPA/SBJP
- Juazeiro do Norte – JDO/SBJU
- Maceió – MCZ/SBMO
- Marília – MII/SBML
- Natal – NAT/SBNT
- Palmas – PMW
- Paulo Afonso – PAF/SBUF
- Petrolina – PNZ/SBPL
- Porto Alegre – POA/SBPA
- Porto Seguro – BPS/SBPS
- Recife – REC/SBRF
- Rio de Janeiro (Rio de Janeiro/Galeão International Airport) – GIG/SBGL
- Salvador – SSA/SBSV
- São José do Rio Preto – SJP/SBSR
- São Luís – SLZ/SBSL
- São Paulo (São Paulo/Guarulhos International Airport – GRU/SBGR and Congonhas/São Paulo International Airport – CGH/SBSP) Hubs
- Teresina – THE/SBTE
- Uberlândia – UDI/SBUL
- Vitória – VIX/SBVT

=== International ===
BRA operated services to the following international destinations:

Scheduled flights:

- Lisbon, Portugal – LIS/LPPT
- Madrid, Spain – MAD/LEMD
- Milan, Italy (Malpensa International Airport) – MXP/LIMC

Charter (operated flights):

- Cologne-Bonn, Germany – CGN/EDDK
- Porto, Portugal – OPO/LPPR
- Oslo, Norway – OSL/ENGM
- Rome, Italy – (Leonardo da Vinci International Airport) – FCO/LIRF
- Stockholm, Sweden – Arlanda International Airport – ARN/ESSA
- Tel Aviv, Israel – TLV/LLBG
- Córdoba, Argentina – COR/SACO

== Fleet ==
The BRA fleet consisted of the following aircraft:

BRA fleet
Aircraft	Total	Introduced	Retired	Notes
Boeing 737-300	7	2001	2007	
Boeing 737-300	1	2009	2010	sold to Puma Air
Boeing 737-400	3	2002	2007	
Boeing 767-200	1	2006	2007	
Boeing 767-300ER	1	2004	2007	sold to OceanAir
Embraer 195	20	Cancelled		Intended to be delivered in 2008.

== Accidents and incidents ==
On March 22, 2006, a Boeing 737-400, registration PR-BRC, came to a stop just short of the embankment at the end of runway 35L at Sao Paulo-Congonhas Airport in Sao Paulo, Brazil after it failed to stop due to hydroplaning. No one on board was killed or injured and all the occupants evacuated safely. The accident was mentioned in the Season 11 episode of the Canadian television series Mayday/Air Crash Investigation "Deadly Reputation".

== See also ==
- List of defunct airlines of Brazil
