= 2009 Andhra Pradesh helicopter crash =

Aviation disaster in India

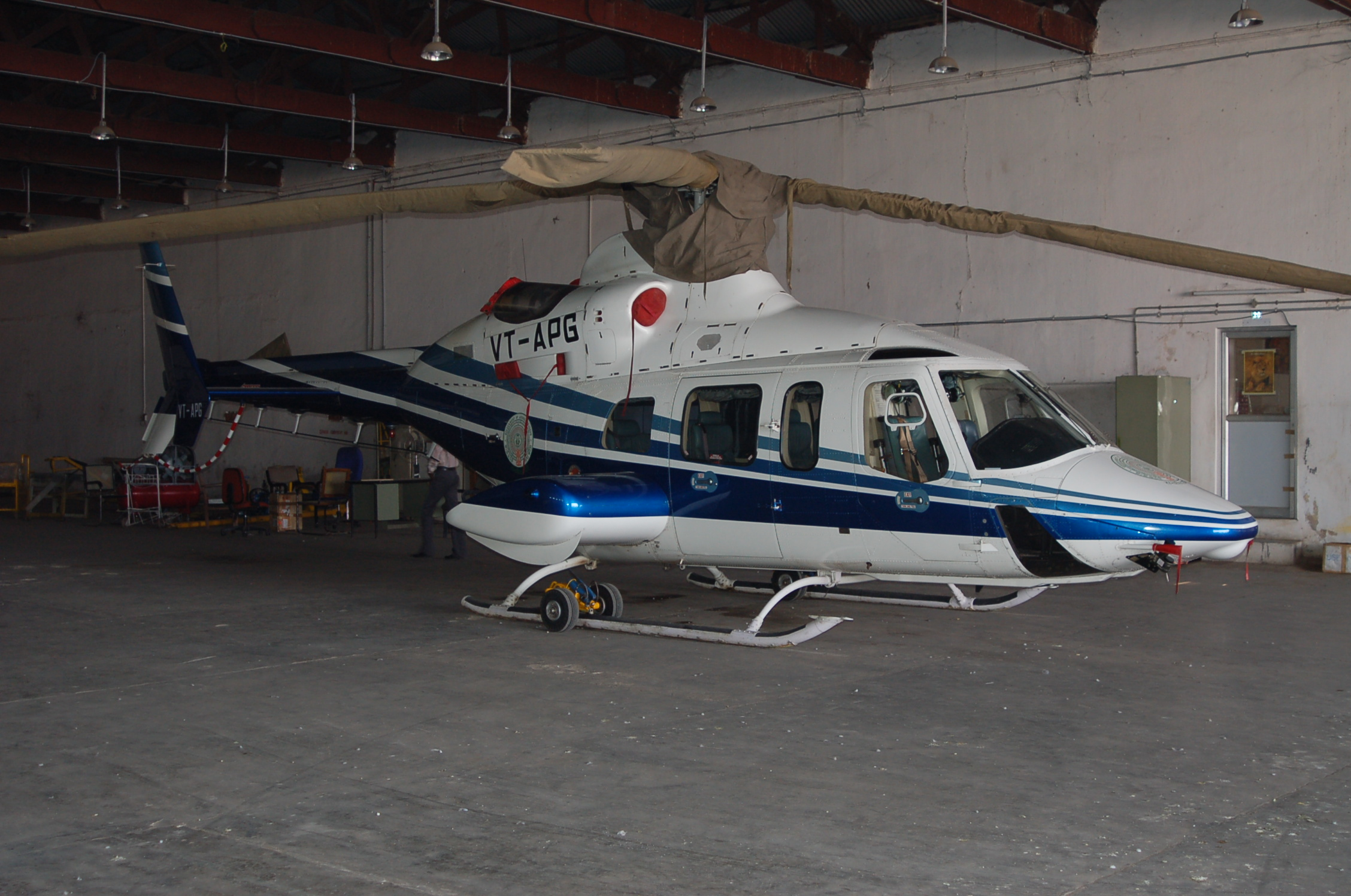
- VT-APG, the helicopter involved in the accident

Occurrence
- Date: 2 September 2009
- Summary: Spatial disorientation resulting from a mechanical failure, pilot error
- Site: Kurnool, Andhra Pradesh, India

Aircraft
- Aircraft type: Bell 430
- Operator: Andhra Pradesh Government
- Registration: VT-APG
- Flight origin: Begumpet airport, India
- Destination: Anuppalle helipad
- Occupants: 5
- Fatalities: 5
- Survivors: 0

The 2009 Andhra Pradesh helicopter crash occurred on 2 September 2009 near Rudrakonda Hill, 40 nautical miles (74 km) from Kurnool, Andhra Pradesh, India. The helicopter was a Bell 430 helicopter owned by the Andhra Pradesh Government, and registered VT-APG. Fatalities included Y. S. Rajasekhara Reddy, the then Chief Minister of Andhra Pradesh among others.

== Accident ==
The Puli 430 helicopter took off from Begumpet Airport, Hyderabad, and soon encountered bad weather. The official accident report states that the aircraft's weather radar was red, meaning that the weather was extreme. The flight crew decided to fly slightly left of their planned route. The pilots soon noticed that the weather was getting worse, and agreed that they would turn left after crossing Krishna River. Begumpet and Shamshabad Air traffic controllers lost contact with the aircraft at 9:02 am IST while it was passing through the dense Nallamala Forest area.

Shortly after 09:20 am IST, the flight crew encountered a problem with the transmission oil pressure. The pilots became engaged in finding out emergency checklist procedures for the transmission oil pressure, but were unsuccessful.

Soon after, the co-pilot continually called out "go around", likely indicating that he thought the aircraft would soon crash into something. During the last 14 seconds, the rate of descent was extremely high. Thereafter the helicopter crashed due to loss of control resulting in high rate of descent in down draught. The helicopter impacted the ground in a steep left bank and all occupants on board died due to crash injuries.

== Aftermath ==
The state government of Andhra Pradesh and the Government of India launched one of the largest search and rescue operations in the history of the country. The state's security officials mentioned that bad weather was hindering the search and rescue efforts. The Home Ministry of India dispatched 5000 CRPF soldiers for the operation while the Defence Ministry of India ordered the Indian Air Force to comb the area using low altitude planes and the Sukhoi-30MKI equipped with thermal imaging systems. In addition, police personnel from six districts were involved in the ground search. Andhra Pradesh's elite anti-Naxal troops, Greyhounds, were also deployed in the area, owing to their extreme familiarity with the jungle terrain of the area. Local tribal residents from this part of the state assisted with the search mission. Patrol parties also combed the Krishna River for the remains of the helicopter. ISRO's RISAT-2 satellite was also deployed to search the area, but the 41 high-resolution images of the area were unable to trace the helicopter.

The wreckage of the helicopter was finally spotted by an IAF Mi-8 helicopter at 08:20 am IST the following day, less than 24 hours after contact was lost with the aircraft.

== Death of Y. S. Rajasekhara Reddy ==
The Indian Prime Minister's Office confirmed the helicopter's crash on the morning of 3 September and the death of all aboard, including that of Y. S. Rajasekhara Reddy. The Director General of Police said that the bodies of Reddy and others were charred beyond recognition and had to be identified on the basis of clothing. The autopsy of all the bodies was carried out at Kurnool Medical College.

== Investigation ==
Although the sparsely populated forest area is considered to be stronghold of the outlawed Naxal communist insurgents, the National Security Advisor of India ruled out the possibility of the Naxals bringing down the helicopter.

The investigation eventually concluded that the factors that caused that crash included the fact that the crew became fixated for more than six minutes in trying to find the reason behind the problem with their transmission oil pressure system, and they became distracted from the worsening weather. They also noted that the flight crew was flying in Instrument meteorological conditions whereas the flight plan was cleared for VFR flying, and the flight crew never discussed the bad weather, diverting, or returning to base.
