= Puma Air =

Brazilian airline

IATA	ICAO	Call sign
Z4	PLY	PUMA BRASIL
- Founded: 2002
- Ceased operations: 2011
- Fleet size: 1
- Parent company: Angola Air Services
- Headquarters: Belém, Brazil
- Key people: Gleison Gamboni de Souza
- Website: www.pumaair.com.br

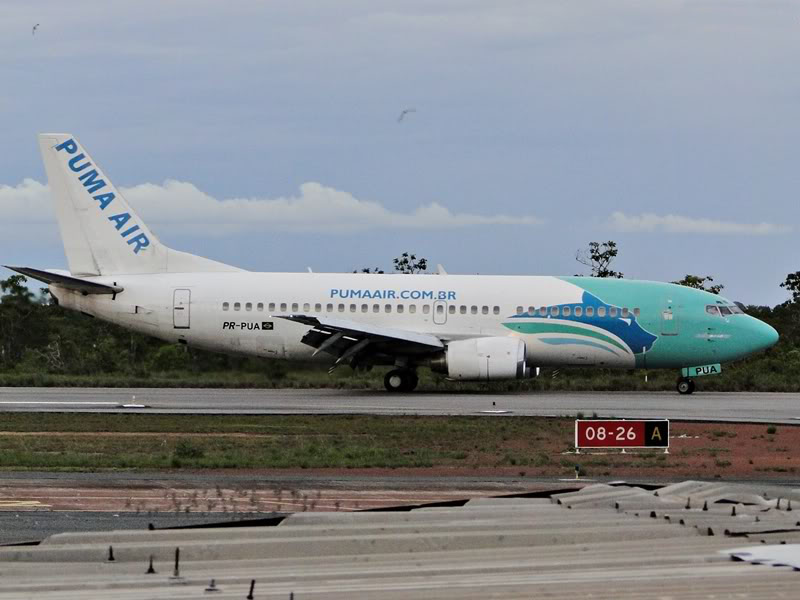
Puma Air Boeing 737-300

Puma Air (Puma Linhas Aéreas) was a Brazilian airline founded in 2002. In August 2011 it ceased operations.

== History ==
The airline was founded on January 21, 2002, with a fleet of 3 Cessna 208B Grand Caravan and serving 12 cities in the state of Pará. Originally a charter and air taxi operator, later it started to operate also scheduled flights.

After a period of expansion and becoming an important regional carrier on the Amazon region, Puma Air, under severe economical difficulties, grounded its aircraft and interrupted all services in February 2009. It was then sold and re-organized.

The new share-holders composition was approved by ANAC in January 2010: 80% of the shares belong to the Brazilian company Ipiranga Obras Públicas e Privadas and to Gleison Gamboni e Souza, and 20% of the shares belong to the Angolan company Angola Air Services. Puma Air restarted its operations on April 12, 2010, with flights from Belém to Macapá and São Paulo, after being grounded between January and March 2010. Puma Air does not restrict its services anymore to the Amazon region.

The airline planned to end the year 2010 with three Boeing 737-300s and to start operating a flight between Recife and Luanda, using a Boeing 767-300ER wet-leased from Gol Airlines with Varig colors. On August 23, 2010, the National Civil Aviation Agency of Brazil (ANAC) designated Puma Air to operate 4 weekly flights on the route. However, in July 2011 those plans were still not implemented.

After being grounded since August 16, 2011, the airline lost its operational license on July 23, 2013.

== Destinations ==
Old logo

Puma Air served the following cities:

Country	City	Airport	Notes
Brazil	Belém	Val de Cans International Airport	
Brazil	Fortaleza	Pinto Martins International Airport	
Angola	Luanda	Quatro de Fevereiro Airport	charter services with wet-leased aircraft
Brazil	Macapá	Alberto Alcolumbre International Airport	
Brazil	São Paulo	Guarulhos/Gov. André Franco Montoro International Airport	

== Fleet ==
As of September 2011 the fleet of Puma Air included the following aircraft:

Puma Air fleet
Aircraft	Total	Years of operation
Cessna 208B Grand Caravan	1	2002–2010
Embraer EMB 120 Brasília	2	2006–2010
Boeing 737-300	1	2010–2011

== See also ==
- List of defunct airlines of Brazil
