= Morro da Igreja =

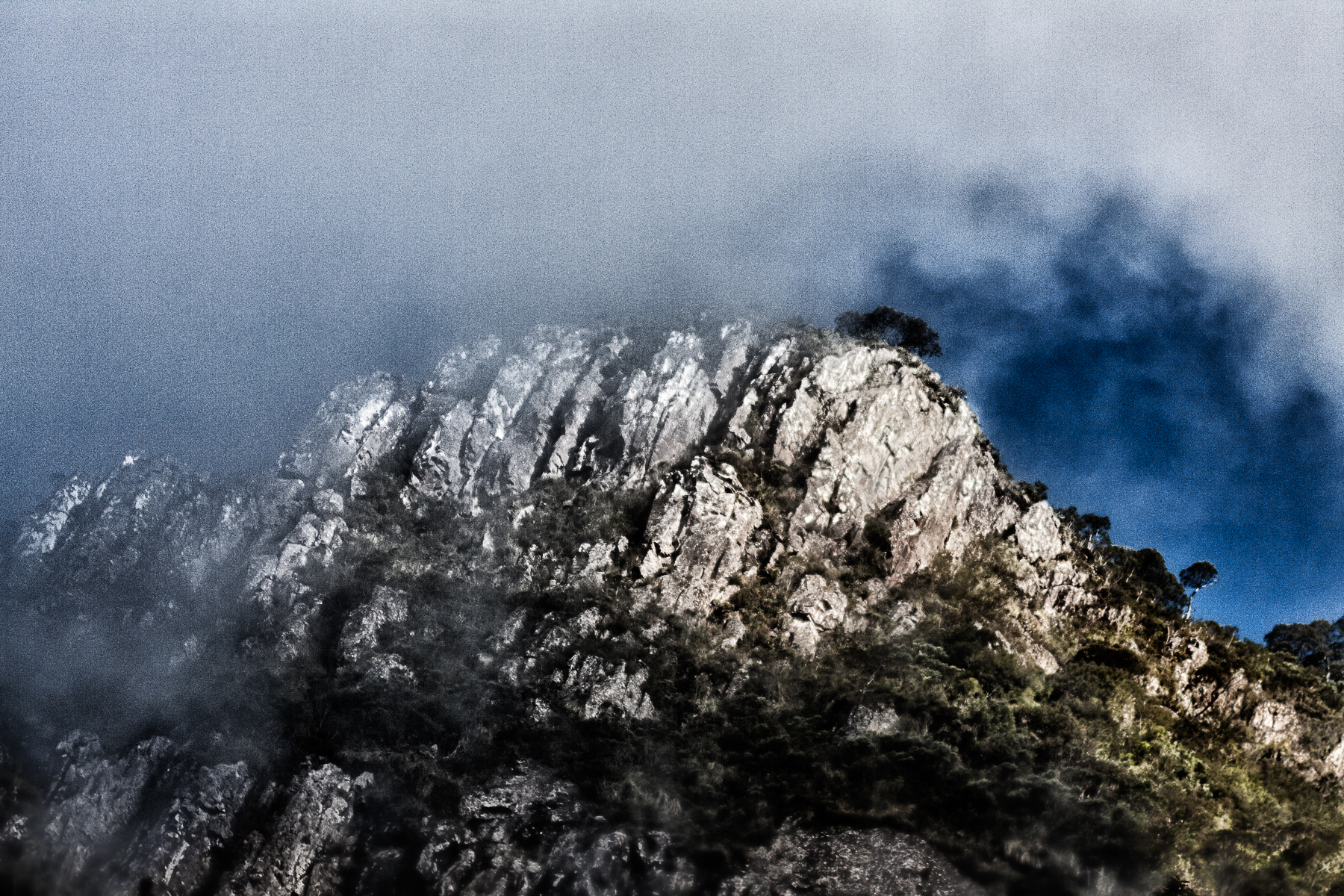
- The summit

Highest point
- Elevation: 1,822 m (5,978 ft)
- Coordinates: 28°07′30″S 49°28′28″W

Naming
- English translation: Hill of the Church
- Language of name: Portuguese
- Pronunciation: Portuguese: [ˈmoʁu dɐ iˈɡɾeʒɐ]

Geography
- Location within Brazil
- Location: Urubici, state of Santa Catarina, Brazil
- Parent range: Serra Geral

Climbing
- Easiest route: By car from Urubici on the road SC 439.

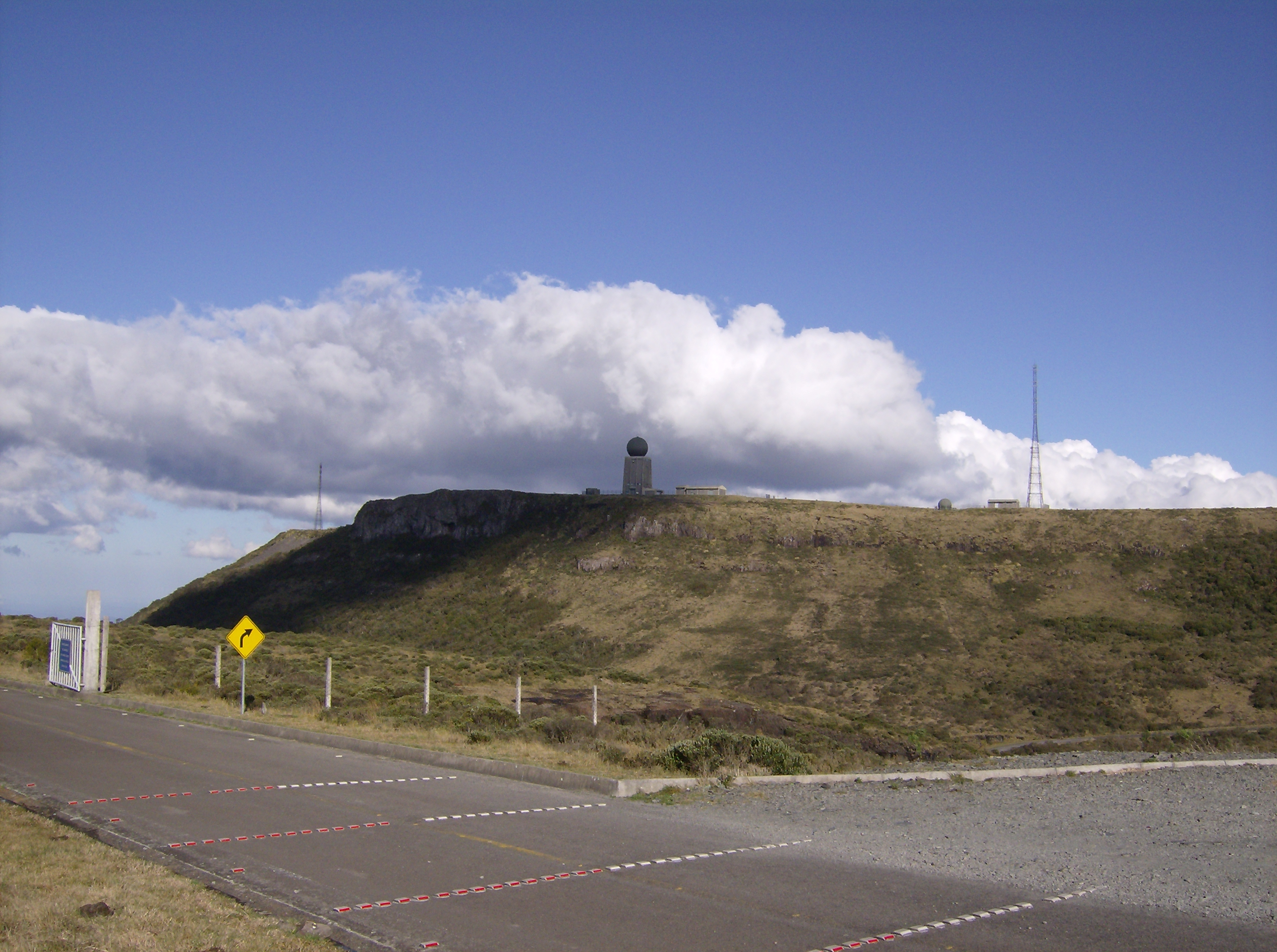
The summit of Morro da igreja

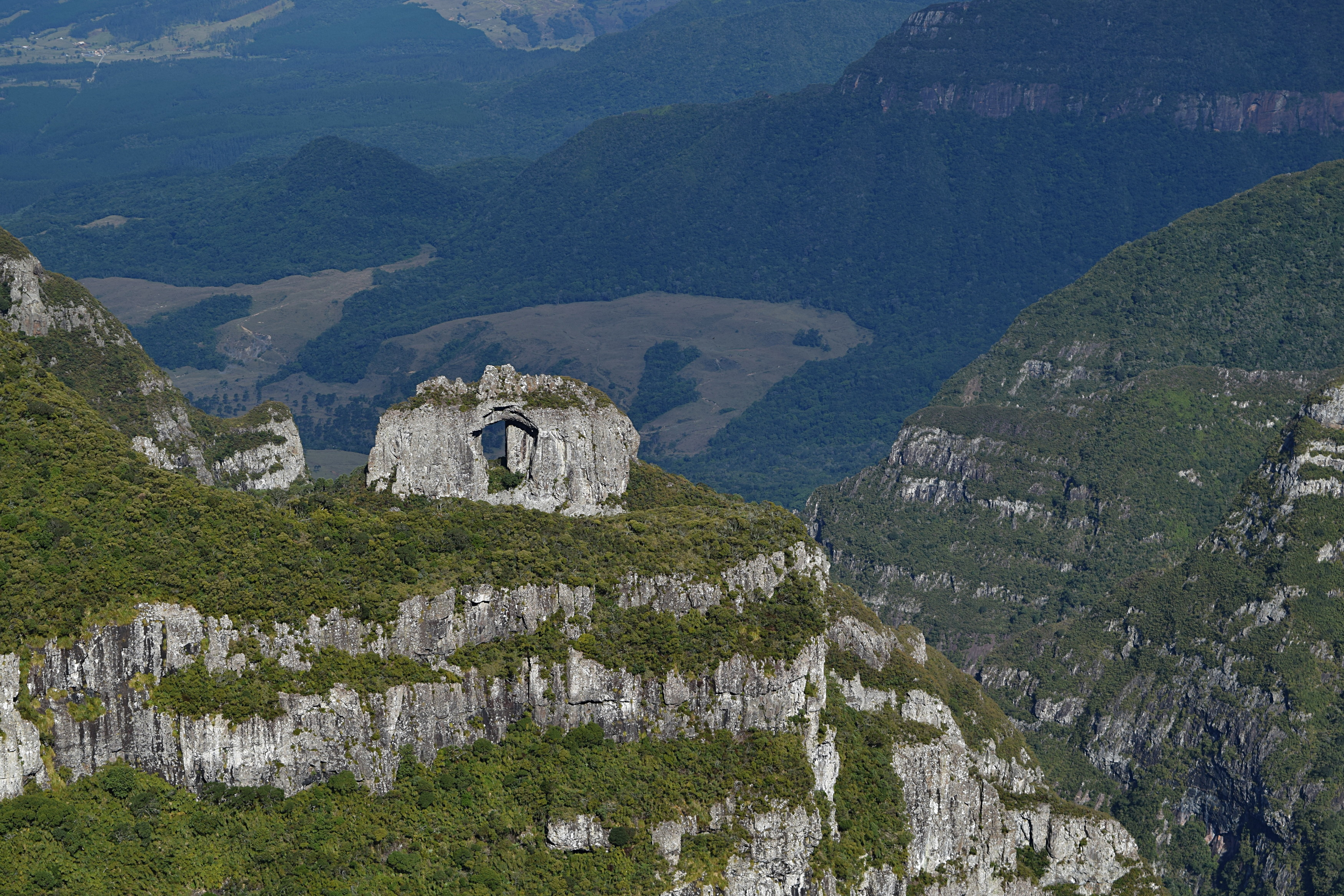
Pedra Furada, a stone photographed from the peak.

Morro da Igreja (Portuguese pronunciation: [ˈmoʁu dɐ iˈɡɾeʒɐ] "Hill of the Church") is a peak situated in Urubici, a municipality of the Santa Catarina state, in southern Brazil. Its latitude is 28º07'31" S and its longitude is 49º29'38" W, with an elevation of 1,822 metres (5,977 feet), the highest inhabited point and the second most elevated of this state.

This peak registered the lowest (unofficial) temperature in Brazil: -17.8 °C (0 °F), on June 29, 1996. It is considered the coldest place in this country; tourism is popular in the winter, when snowfalls can occur.

Officially, there is a 1,810 meter weather station by Epagri/Ciram. The record low was registered on August 21, 2020, by a 2 centimeter snowy cold snap. It was a -8.6 °C (17 °F) windy and CAVOK morning, with a high of -1.2 °C (30 °F) in the afternoon, actually the second lowest high. The absolute 24-hour lowest high ever registered is -2.3 °C (28 °F), on July 23, 2013, same day of the former record low of -7.8 °C (18 °F).

The Brazilian Air Force has a military base on the summit equipped with radars and radio relays for air traffic control (CINDACTA) of the Brazilian Southern Region.

There is a curious natural formation in this area, called Pedra Furada (literally Drilled Stone), and it can be spotted from the peak.

== See also ==
- Morro da Boa Vista, the highest peak of Santa Catarina.
- Serra do Rio do Rastro

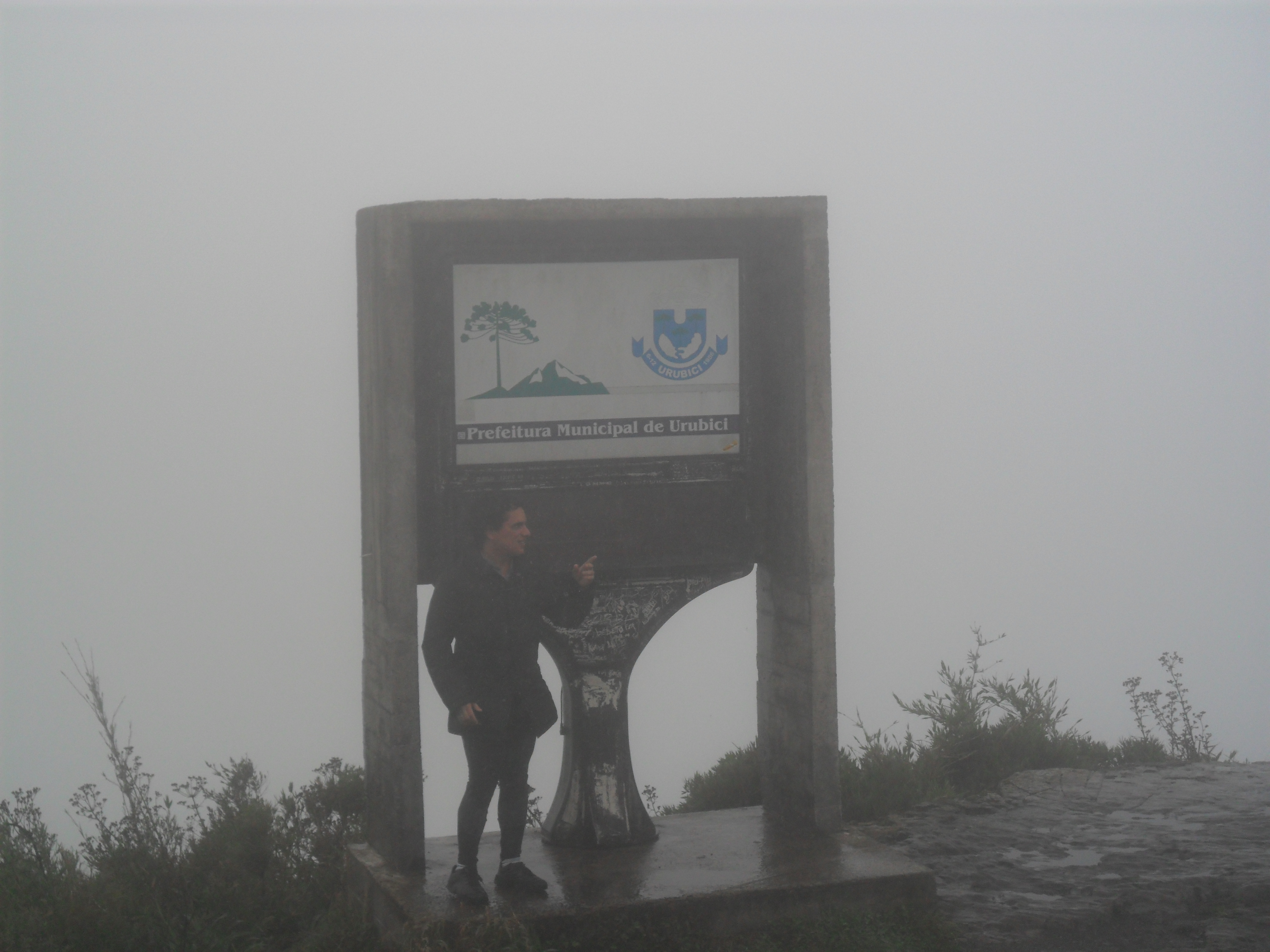
A Thermometer above the Morro da igreja
