= Urubici =

- Municipality
- Municipality of Urubici
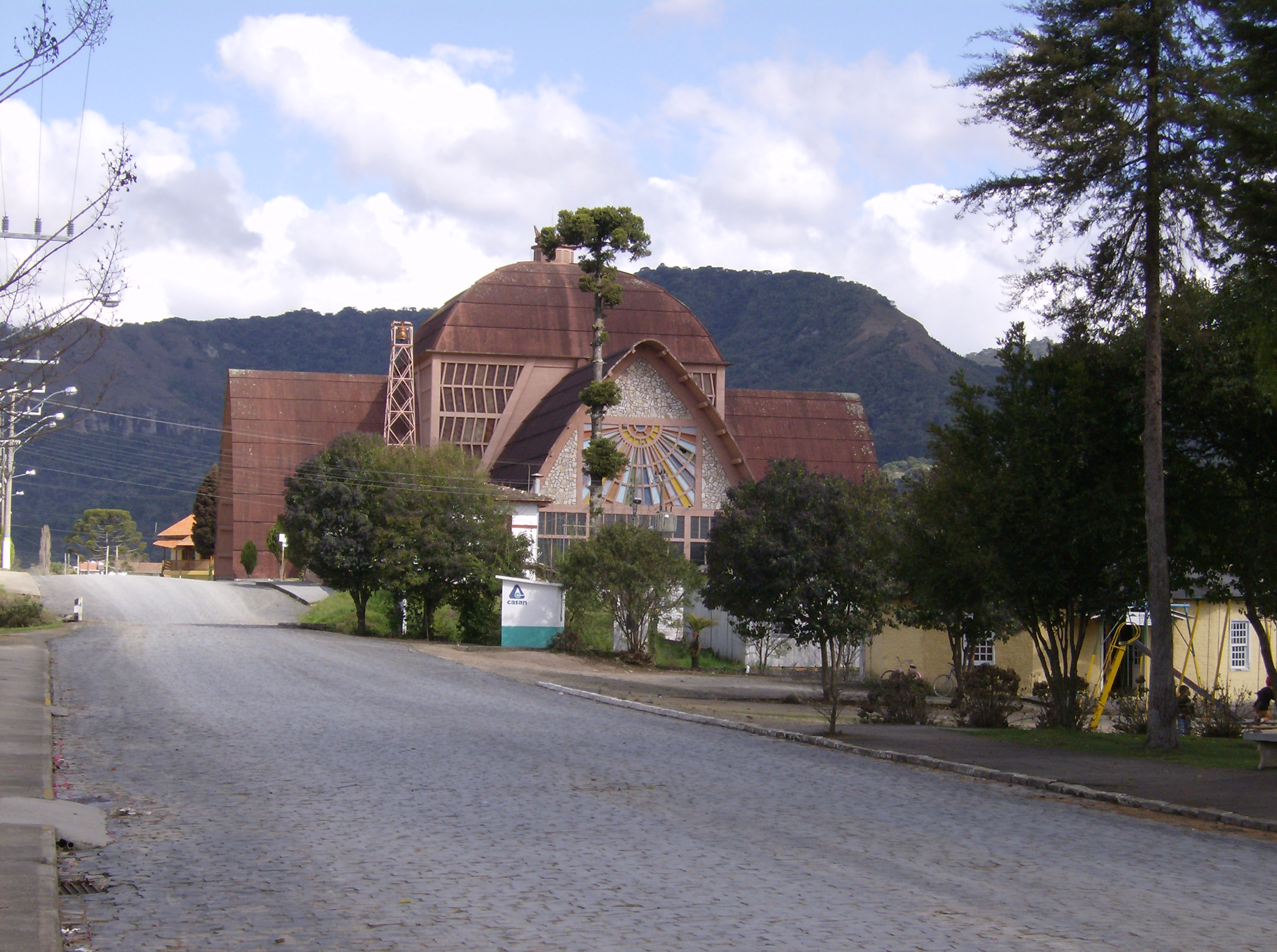

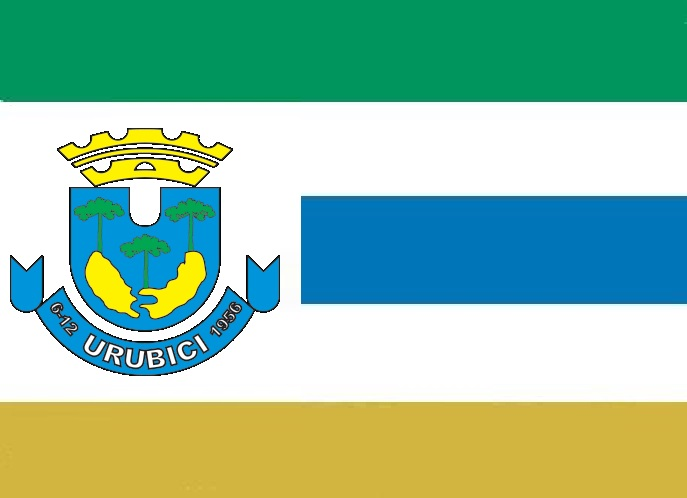
- Flag Coat of arms

- Location of Urubici

- Location within Brazil
- Coordinates: 28°00′54″S 49°35′31″W
- Country: Brazil
- Region: South
- State: Santa Catarina
- Founded: December 6, 1956

Government
  - Mayor: Mariza Costa

Area
  - Total: 1,019.232 km^{2} (393.528 sq mi)
- Elevation: 915 m (3,002 ft)

Population (2020)
  - Total: 11,273
  - Density: 10.4/km^{2} (27/sq mi)
- Time zone: UTC-3 (UTC-3)
  - Summer (DST): UTC-2 (UTC-2)
- HDI (2010): 0.694 – medium
- Website: urubici.sc.gov.br

Urubici is a southern Brazilian municipality located in the state of Santa Catarina.

== History ==
=== Etymology ===
There are two primary hypotheses for the origin of the name "Urubici". The most widely accepted is that it derives from the Tupi language or the General Paulista language word urubysy, meaning "a row of vultures" (from urubu, vulture, and ysy, row).

=== Settlement and Foundation ===
The region was originally home to indigenous populations, as evidenced by pre-Columbian rock engravings found in the area that date back thousands of years. Between 1903 and 1911, agricultural settlers and loggers began moving into the territory. In 1924, attracted by the highly fertile soil of the Canoas River valley, a substantial wave of Italian, German, and Latvian immigrants arrived, establishing agriculture and cattle-raising as the backbone of the local economy.

Urubici was officially established as a district belonging to the municipality of São Joaquim by Municipal Law No. 158 on July 15, 1922, and its local administration was installed on January 28, 1923. The district remained under the jurisdiction of São Joaquim for over three decades until it was elevated to the status of an independent municipality by Santa Catarina State Law No. 274 on December 6, 1956. The municipality was officially incorporated on February 3, 1957.

== Economy ==
The economy of the region is based on agriculture and tourism.

== Neighboring cities ==
Some of the nearest cities are São Joaquim-60 km (37.28 mi.), Lages, Tubarão, and Criciúma.

== Access ==
Access to the city is by the SC-110 state highway.

== Climate ==
The climate of the area is temperate, with temperatures ranging between 12 °C (53.6 °F) and 16 °C (60.8 °F). In the months of June, July, and August, the thermometers get to show negative temperatures, and it can snow. The minimum record temperature (it's also the Brazilian minimum record temperature) was -17.8 °C (0 °F) at Morro da Igreja, the highest inhabited point of this municipality.

== Tourism ==
The town of Urubici was founded in 1915, as the village of São Joaquim. Today, its natural beauties attract tourists and backpackers from all corners of Brazil looking for the landscapes of the mountain ridge of the state of Santa Catarina. Located in the valley of the Canoas river, the town has in its hills, valleys, trails and waterfalls places for those who want to rest or go for ecotourism and adventure tourism. Urubici is part of the São Joaquim National park, which is very rich in flora and fauna. The park has an area of 493 km^{2} (190 sq mi) and is divided between the fields on top of the ridge, where we have the lowest temperatures in Brazil, and the area at the foot of the ridge, with temperature around the 20 °C (68 °F). A visit to it reveals incredible landscapes, such as the Laranjeiras Canyon (Canyon of the Orange Trees) and the famous Pedra Furada (Holed Rock), which can be seen from the Morro da Igreja (Church Hill), known as the highest point in the South of Brazil, with 1,827 meters (5,994.09 ft.) of altitude. In the surroundings of the town there are other places that deserve a visit, such as the Avencal Waterfall, with 100 meters (328.08 ft.) of free fall, and indigenous caves that are found in the area. There it is possible to see rupestral engravings which date back to more than four thousand years ago. In the severe winter, between the months of June and August, there can be some snow, which gives a European appearance to its streets. In 1996, the town registered the lowest temperature ever recorded in thermometers in Brazil, −17.8 °C (0.04 °F). It is the ideal weather for those who like chatting in front of a fireplace, sipping some good wine, or just relax. Throughout its history, Urubici was influenced by Portuguese, Italian, German, African and Latvian settlers, who left their characteristics in its culture, arts, architecture, and cuisine. The city is also known as the land of the vegetables because of the variety and quality of the local production.

== Gallery ==
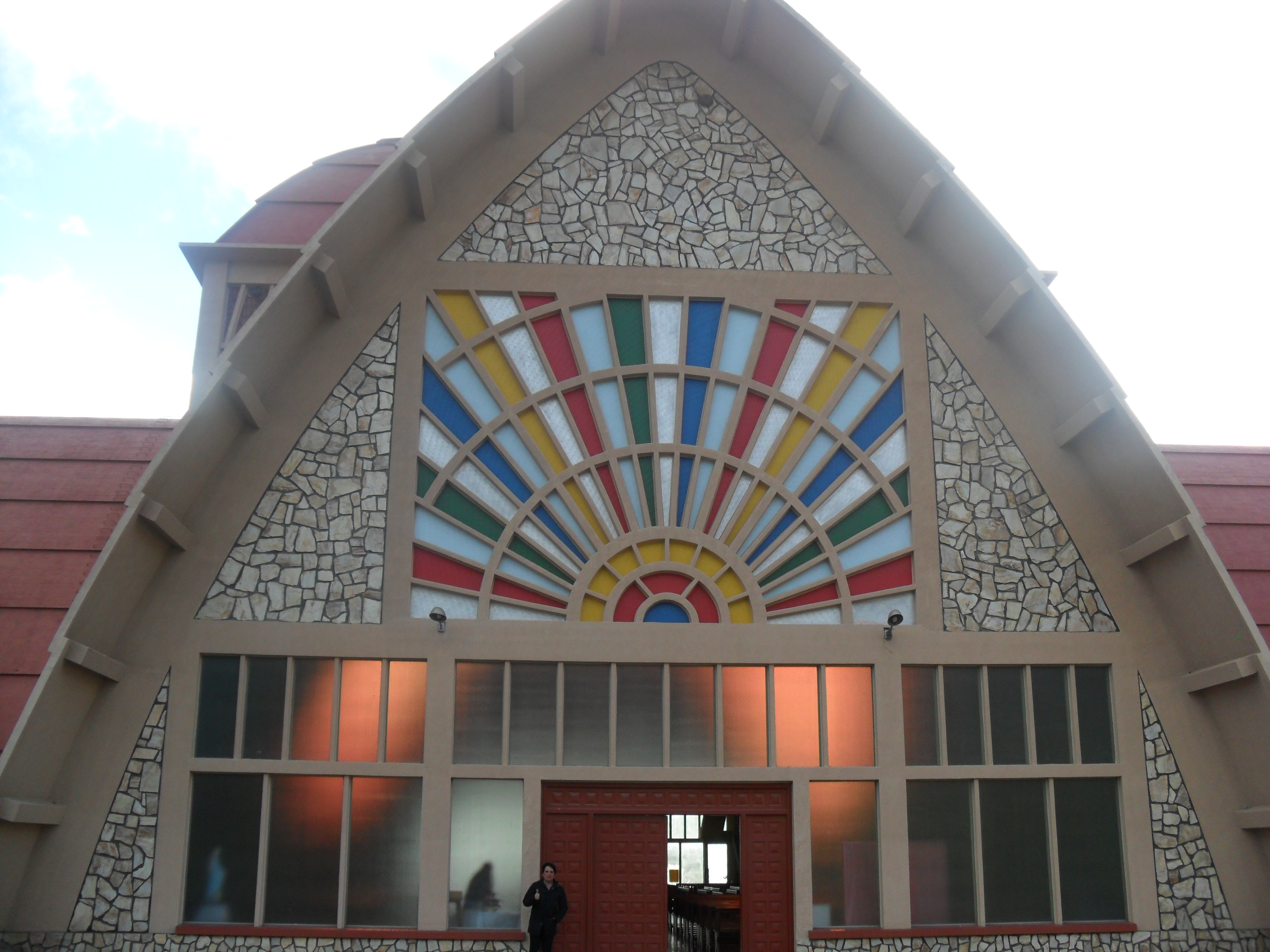
Main Church

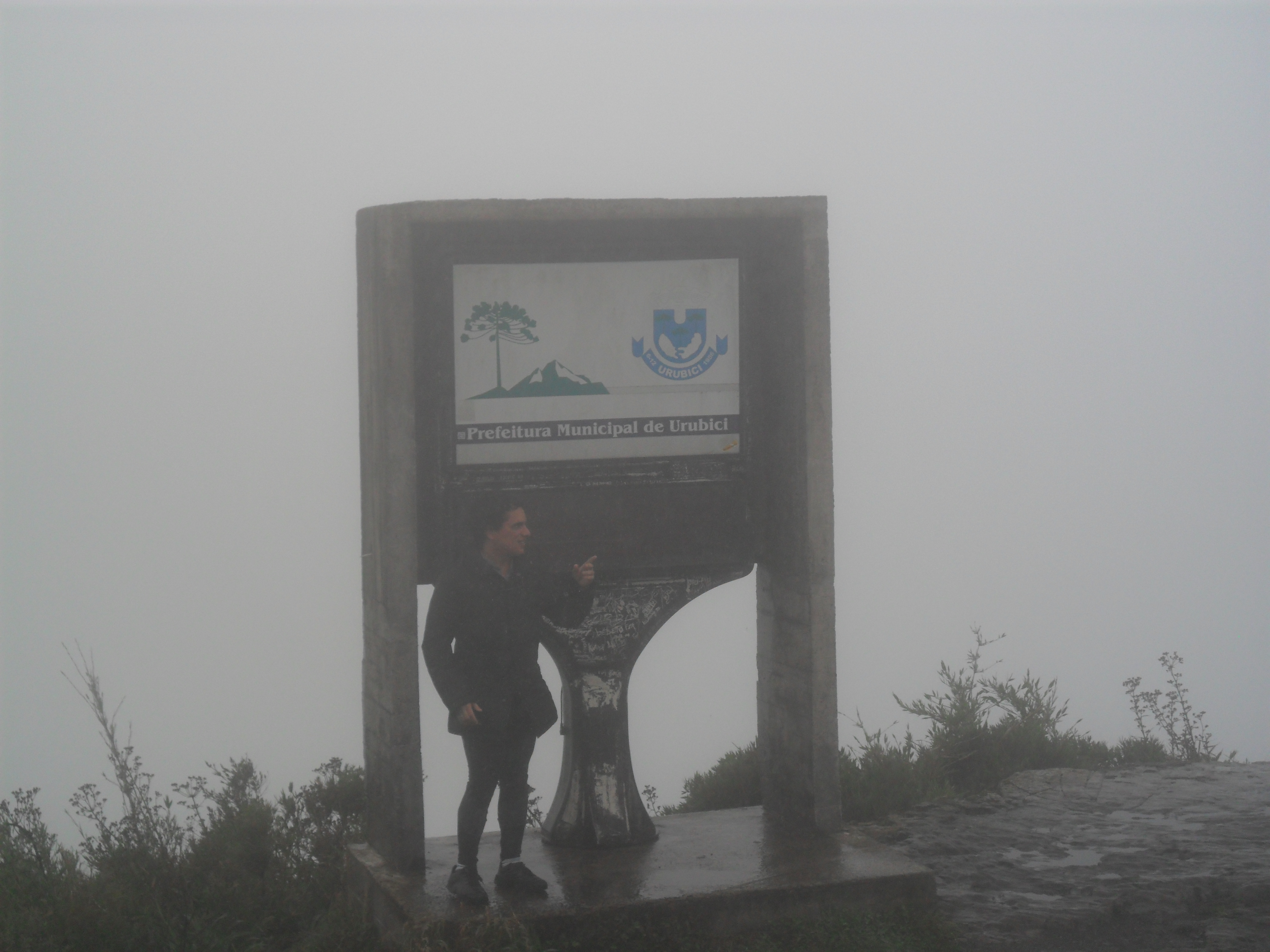
Thermometer on the top of Morro da Igreja´s Mountain

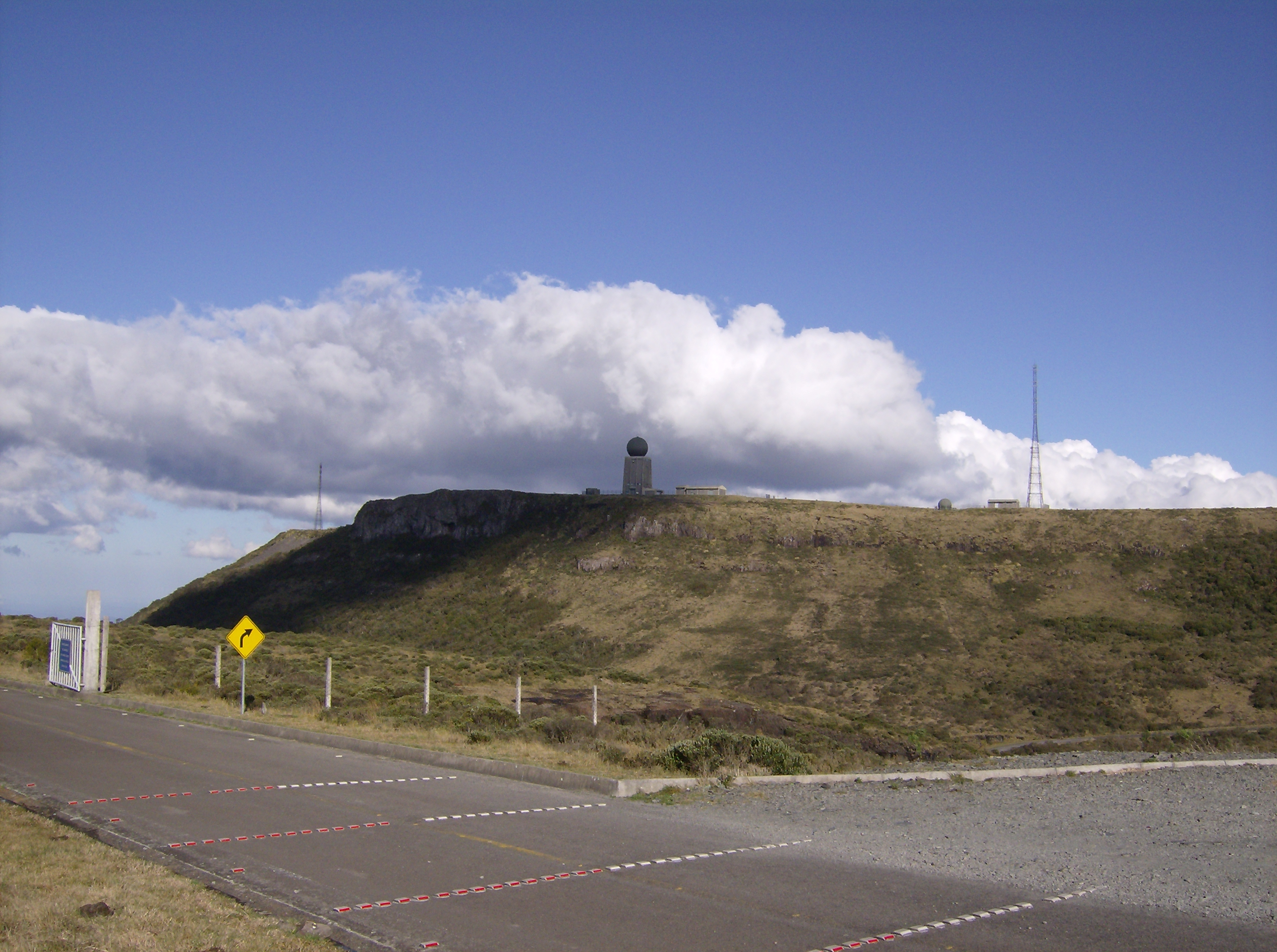
Morro da Igreja

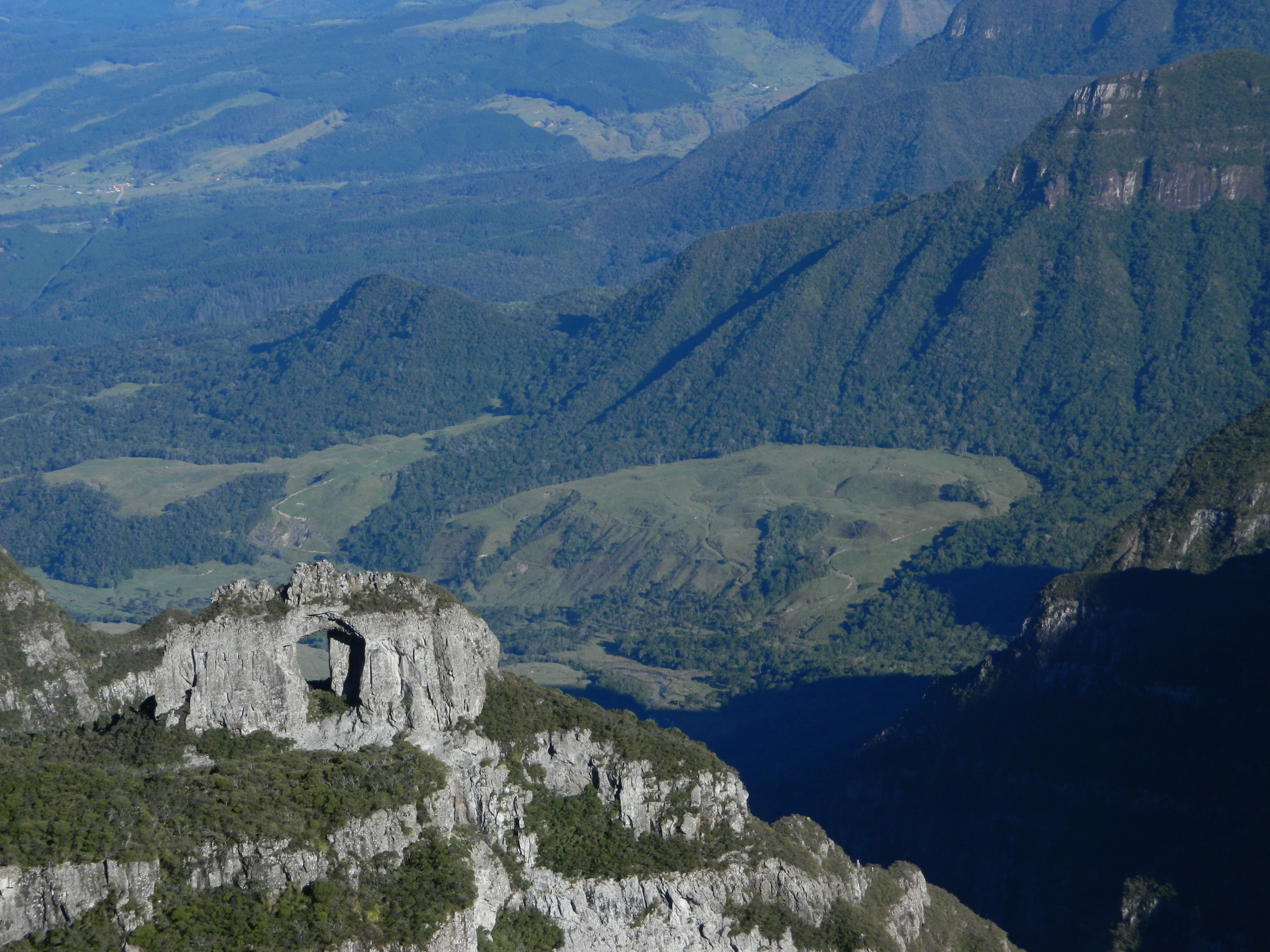
Holed Stone and The Canyons
