= List of mountains in Brazil =

This is a list of mountains in Brazil, including the tallest as well as other notable peaks

== Mountains in Brazil ==
Mountain	Metres	Feet	Range	Notes
Pico da Neblina	2,995	9,826	Serra do Imeri	Highest in Brazil; 2015 measurement, previous measurements of 3014 m (1966) and 2994 m (2004)
Pico 31 de Março	2,974	9,757	Serra do Imeri	Shared with Venezuela; 2015 measurement, previous measurements of 2992 m (1966) and 2973 m (2004)
Pico da Bandeira	2,891	9,485		Highest in the states of Minas Gerais and Espírito Santo, Highest in the Brazilian Highlands
Pico do Cruzeiro	2,861	9,386		Unconfirmed elevation
Pico do Calçado	2,849	9,347		
Pedra da Mina	2,798	9,180	Mantiqueira Mountains	Highest in São Paulo state
Pico das Agulhas Negras	2,791	9,157	Mantiqueira Mountains	Highest in Rio de Janeiro State
Pico do Cristal	2,770	9,090		
Mount Roraima	2,734	8,970	Guiana Shield	Shared with Venezuela and Guyana – Border tripoint elevation
Pico dos Marins	2,420	7,940	Mantiqueira Mountains	
Pico do Barbado	2,033	6,670		Highest in Bahia
Pico Paraná	1,877	6,158	Serra do Mar	Highest in Paraná
Morro da Boa Vista	1,827	5,994	Serra Geral	Highest in Santa Catarina
Morro da Igreja	1,822	5,978	Serra Geral	
Morro das Antenas	1,750	5,740	Serra Geral	
Monte Caburaí	1,465	4,806		– is the northernmost point of Brazil
Pico do Monte Negro	1,398	4,587		Highest in Rio Grande do Sul
Pico São Sebastião	1,378	4,521		Ilhabela island – Highest island peak in Brazil
Morro do Capão Doce	1,340	4,400	Serra da Fartura	Highest peak in South Region, Brazil
Pico do Papagaio	1,200	3,900		Highest in Pernambuco
Pico do Jabre	1,197	3,927	Brazilian Highlands	Highest in Paraíba
Pico do Jaraguá	1,135	3,724	Serra da Cantareira	
Pico Alto	1,114	3,655	Serra de Baturité	Highest in Ceará
Maciço do Urucum	1,065	3,494		Highest in Mato Grosso do Sul
Pico da Tijuca	1,017	3,337		Most prominent peak in Urban Area(lifts ca.1000m inside Rio de Janeiro City
Corcovado	710	2,330		The Peak of o Cristo Redentor
Monte Pascoal	586	1,923		First land portion observed from sea on discovery of Brazil in April 1500.
Pão de Açúcar	397	1,302		Famous rock monolith in Rio de Janeiro city

== See also ==
- List of tunnels in Brazil
