= List of Brazilian states by highest point =

Several highest points of the Brazilian states are unnamed and are better known by the mountain range they are in. The highest point in Brazil is Pico da Neblina, in Amazonas, at 2,994 metres (9,822 feet), which ranks the country as 69th by highest point.

== List ==
Rank	State	Peak	Range	Height (m)	Height (ft)
1	Amazonas	Pico da Neblina	Serra do Imeri	2,994	9,822
2	Espírito Santo	Pico da Bandeira	Serra do Caparaó	2,892	9,488
2	Minas Gerais	Pico da Bandeira	Serra do Caparaó	2,892	9,488
3	São Paulo	Pedra da Mina	Serra da Mantiqueira	2,798	9,180
4	Rio de Janeiro	Pico das Agulhas Negras	Serra da Mantiqueira	2,792	9,160
5	Roraima	Monte Roraima	Guiana Highlands	2,734	8,970
6	Bahia	Pico do Barbado	Chapada Diamantina	2,033	6,670
7	Paraná	Pico Paraná	Serra do Mar	1,877	6,158
8	Santa Catarina	Morro da Boa Vista	Serra Geral	1,827	5,994
9	Goiás	Serra Pouso Alto	Chapada dos Veadeiros National Park	1,676	5,497
10	Rio Grande do Sul	Pico do Monte Negro	Serra Geral	1,398	4,587
11	Distrito Federal	Pico do Roncador	Brazilian Highlands	1,341	4,400
12	Tocantins	Unnamed location	Serra Traíras	1,340	4,396
13	Pernambuco	Pico do Papagaio	Brazilian Highlands	1,260	4,134
14	Paraíba	Pico do Jabre	Brazilian Highlands	1,197	3,927
15	Ceará	Pico Serra Branca	Serra das Matas	1,154	3,786
16	Rondônia	Unnamed location	Serra dos Pacaás	1,126	3,694
17	Mato Grosso	Unnamed location	Serra Monte Cristo	1,118	3,668
18	Mato Grosso do Sul	Maciço do Urucum	none	1,065	3,494
19	Pará	Unnamed location	Serra do Acari	906	2,972
20	Rio Grande do Norte	Unnamed location	Serra do Coqueiro	868	2,848
21	Piauí	Unnamed location	Chapada das Mangabeiras	860	2,822
22	Alagoas	Unnamed location	Serra Santa Cruz	844	2,769
23	Maranhão	Unnamed location	Chapada das Mangabeiras	804	2,638
24	Sergipe	Unnamed location	Serra Negra	742	2,434
25	Amapá	Unnamed location	Serra Tumucumaque	701	2,300
26	Acre	Unnamed location	Serra do Divisor	609	1,998
