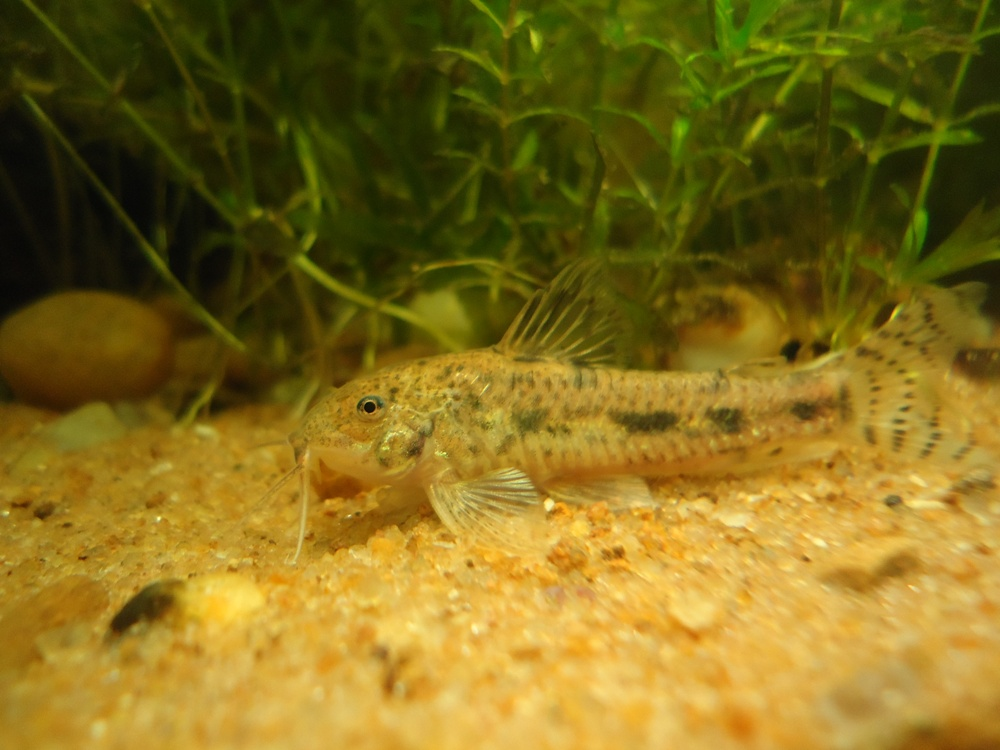
- Aspidoras fuscoguttatus

Scientific classification
- Kingdom: Animalia
- Phylum: Chordata
- Class: Actinopterygii
- Order: Siluriformes
- Family: Callichthyidae
- Subfamily: Corydoradinae
- Genus: Aspidoras; R. Ihering, 1907

Type species
- Aspidoras rochai Ihering, 1907

= Aspidoras =

Genus of fishes

Aspidoras is a genus of catfishes of the family Callichthyidae from Brazil.

== Taxonomy ==
The type species for this genus is Aspidoras rochai. The name Aspidoras is derived from the Greek aspis (shield) and dora (skin).

Aspidoras is easily distinguished from the other genera of the subfamily Corydoradinae by the presence of a supraoccipital fontanel; this character is an autapomorphy for the genus. Many of the species of Aspidoras are similar and often hard to distinguish. Without specimens, it is often very difficult to positively identify a species from photographs alone. They are all small species. A. taurus is exceptional in that it just surpasses 5 cm in length.

The monophyly of the genus has been demonstrated.

== Species ==
There are currently 18 recognized species in this genus:

- Aspidoras albater Nijssen & Isbrücker, 1976
- Aspidoras aldebaran Tencatt, Britto, Isbrücker & Pavanelli, 2022
- Aspidoras azaghal Tencatt, Muriel-Cunha, Zuanon, Ferreira & Britto, 2020
- Aspidoras belenos Britto, 1998
- Aspidoras brunneus Nijssen & Isbrücker, 1976
- Aspidoras carvalhoi Nijssen & Isbrücker, 1976
- Aspidoras depinnai Britto, 2000
- Aspidoras fuscoguttatus Nijssen & Isbrücker, 1976
- Aspidoras gabrieli Wosiacki, T. G. Pereira & R. Reis, 2014
- Aspidoras kiriri Oliveira, Zanata, Tencatt & Britto, 2017
- Aspidoras lakoi P. Miranda Ribeiro, 1949
- Aspidoras maculosus Nijssen & Isbrücker, 1976
- Aspidoras mephisto Tencatt & Bichuette, 2017
- Aspidoras poecilus Nijssen & Isbrücker, 1976
- Aspidoras psammatides Britto, F. C. T. Lima & A. C. A. Santos, 2005
- Aspidoras raimundi (Steindachner, 1907)
- Aspidoras rochai Ihering, 1907
- Aspidoras velites Britto, Lima & C. L. R. Moreira, 2002

== Distribution ==
Aspidoras species are endemic to small and shallow streams draining the Brazilian Shield. The species of Aspidoras are distributed in eastern and central Brazil. Most species are narrowly endemic, occurring in restricted areas of some major river drainages: A. fuscoguttatus and A. lakoi from the Paraná River system. A. albater, A. eurycephalus and A. gabrieli from the Tocantins River system. A. brunneus, A. marianae and A. microgalaeus from the Xingu River system. A. belenos, A. pauciradiatus and A. velites from Araguaia River system. A. rochai from rivers around Fortaleza. A. raimundi from the Parnaíba River. A. carvalhoi from rivers around Guaramiranga, Ceará State. A. maculosus from the Itapicuru River. A. menezesi from the Jaguaribe River. A. spilotus from the Acaráu River. A. poecilus from the Xingu River, Araguaia River, and Tocantins River systems. A. psammatides from the Paraguaçu River. A. virgulatus from the coastal rivers in Espírito Santo. A. depinnai is from the Ipojuca River basin, Pernambuco State. A. taurus is known from the upper Itiquira River and upper Taquari River, both tributaries of the Paraguay River, Mato Grosso State, Brazil.

== In the aquarium ==
Aspidoras do fairly well in aquaria under similar conditions as for most Corydoras species. The water conditions that seem best are a pH of 6.8 to 7.0 and a temperature of about 22 °C to 26 °C. The species that is most likely to be found in an aquarium is the sixray corydoras, Aspidoras pauciradiatus.
