= Aspidoras rochai =

Conservation status
- Data Deficient (IUCN 3.1)

Scientific classification
- Kingdom: Animalia
- Phylum: Chordata
- Class: Actinopterygii
- Order: Siluriformes
- Family: Callichthyidae
- Genus: Aspidoras
- Species: A. rochai

Binomial name
- Aspidoras rochai R. Ihering, 1907

Species of ray-finned fish

Aspidoras rochai, commonly known as the loach catfish, is a tropical freshwater fish belonging to the Corydoradinae sub-family, the corys, of the family Callichthyidae, the armoured catfishes. It originates in inland waters in South America, and is found in coastal rivers in Ceará, Brazil. This species was first formally described in 1907 by the Brazilian biologist Rodolpho von Ihering with its type locality given as Guaramiranga in Ceara State. The specific name honours Francisco Dias da Rocha who offered the holotype to Ihering.

The fish will grow up to 4.4 centimetres (1.7 inches) in standard length. It lives in a tropical climate in water with a 6.0–7.5 pH, a water hardness of up to 14 dGH, and a temperature range of 21–25 °C (70–77 °F). It feeds on worms, benthic crustaceans, insects, and plant matter. It lays eggs in dense vegetation and adults do not guard the eggs.

== See also ==
- List of freshwater aquarium fish species
