= Morro da Boa Vista =

Mountain in Brasil

- Location within Brazil

Highest point
- Elevation: 1,823.6 m (5,983 ft)
- Listing: Brazilian state high point
- Coordinates: 27°54′31″S 49°19′16″W

Geography
- Location: Santa Catarina, Brazil
- Parent range: Serra Geral

Morro da Boa Vista (Portuguese pronunciation: [ˈmoʁu dɐ ˈboɐ ˈvistɐ]) is the highest mountain in the Brazilian state of Santa Catarina, the highest at Serra Geral and the third highest in Southern Brazil, after Pico Paraná and Pico Caratuva, at 1,823.6 metres (5,983 ft). The peak can get quite cold during winter, with the possibility of snowfall. It is about 91 km north-east of Pico do Monte Negro, another Brazilian state record holder. It is 21 km south-east of Bom Retiro, Santa Catarina.

== See also ==
- Morro da Igreja
