= São José dos Ausentes =

Municipality of Rio Grande do Sul, Brazil

São José dos Ausentes Ausentino
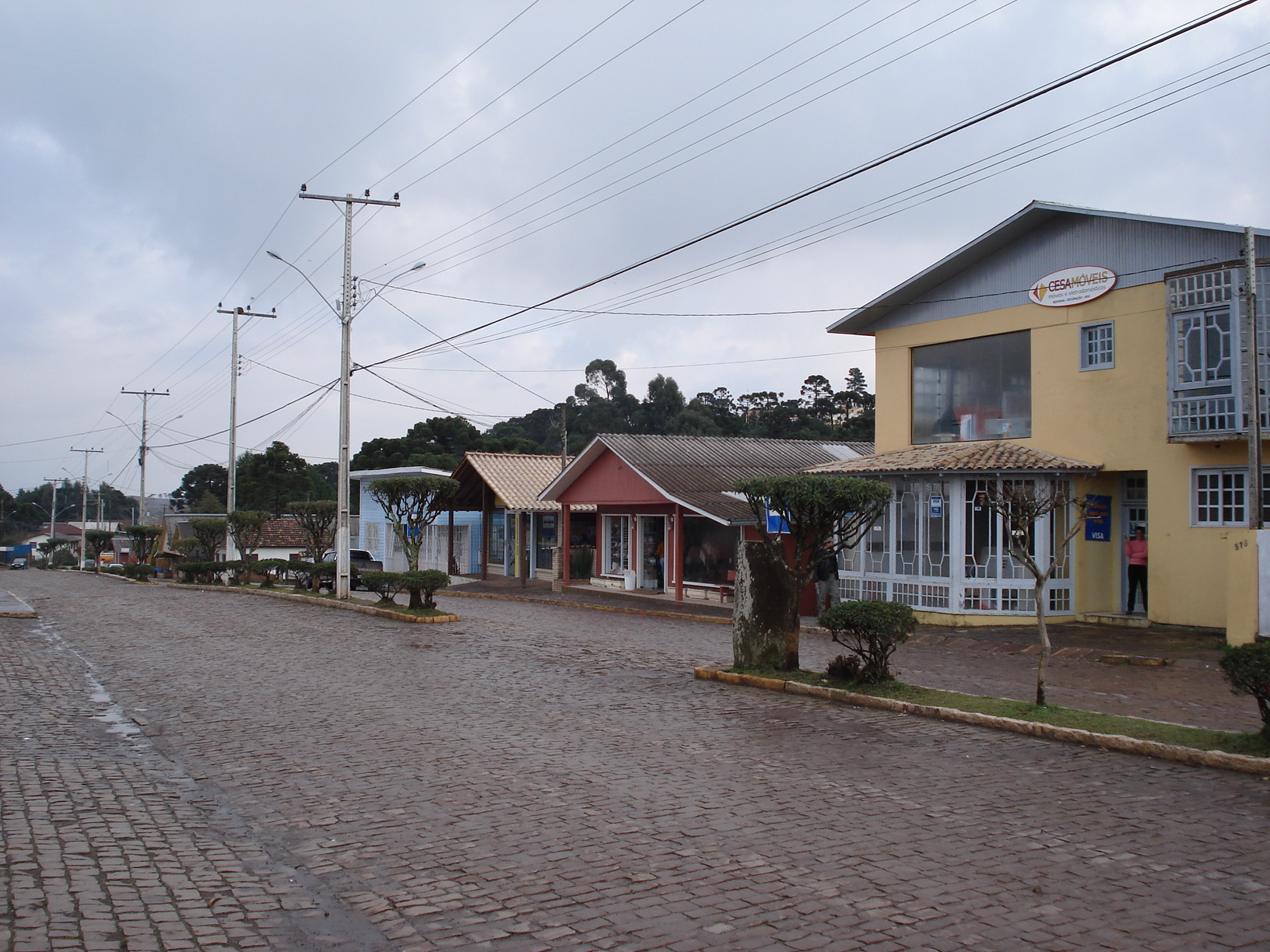

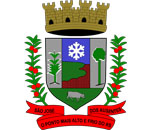
- Flag Coat of arms
- Nickname: Ausentes(Absents in english)
- Location in Brazil
- Coordinates: 28°45′00″S 50°03′50″W
- Country: Brazil
- Region: South
- State: State of Rio Grande do Sul
- Founded: March 20, 1992

Government
  - Mayor: Ernesto Valim Boeira

Area
  - Total: 1,176.685 km^{2} (454.321 sq mi)
- Elevation: 1,200 m (3,900 ft)

Population (2020)
  - Total: 3,543
  - Density: 2.796/km^{2} (7.24/sq mi)
- Time zone: UTC−3 (BRT)
- Postal code: 95280000
- Website: São José dos Ausentes City Hall

São José dos Ausentes is a municipality with an average altitude of 1200 meters, in the state of Rio Grande do Sul, Brazil. Its population was approximately 3,543 in 2020. It has an area of approximately 1176 km². Pico do Monte Negro is located in São José dos Ausentes, with its peak 1403 meters above sea level. It is the highest point in Rio Grande do Sul State. The town is 220 km away from the state's capital, Porto Alegre.

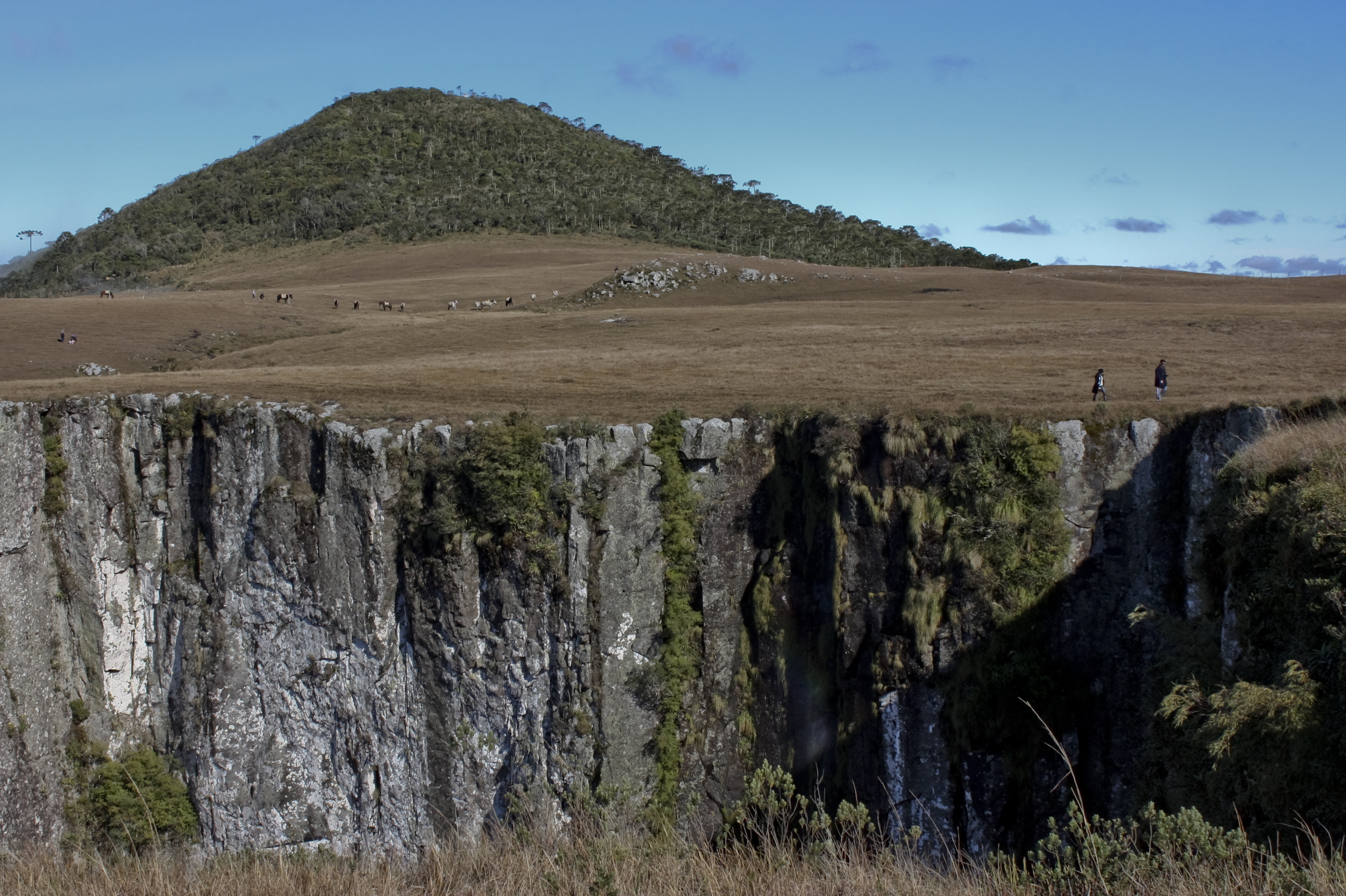
Monte Negro Peak

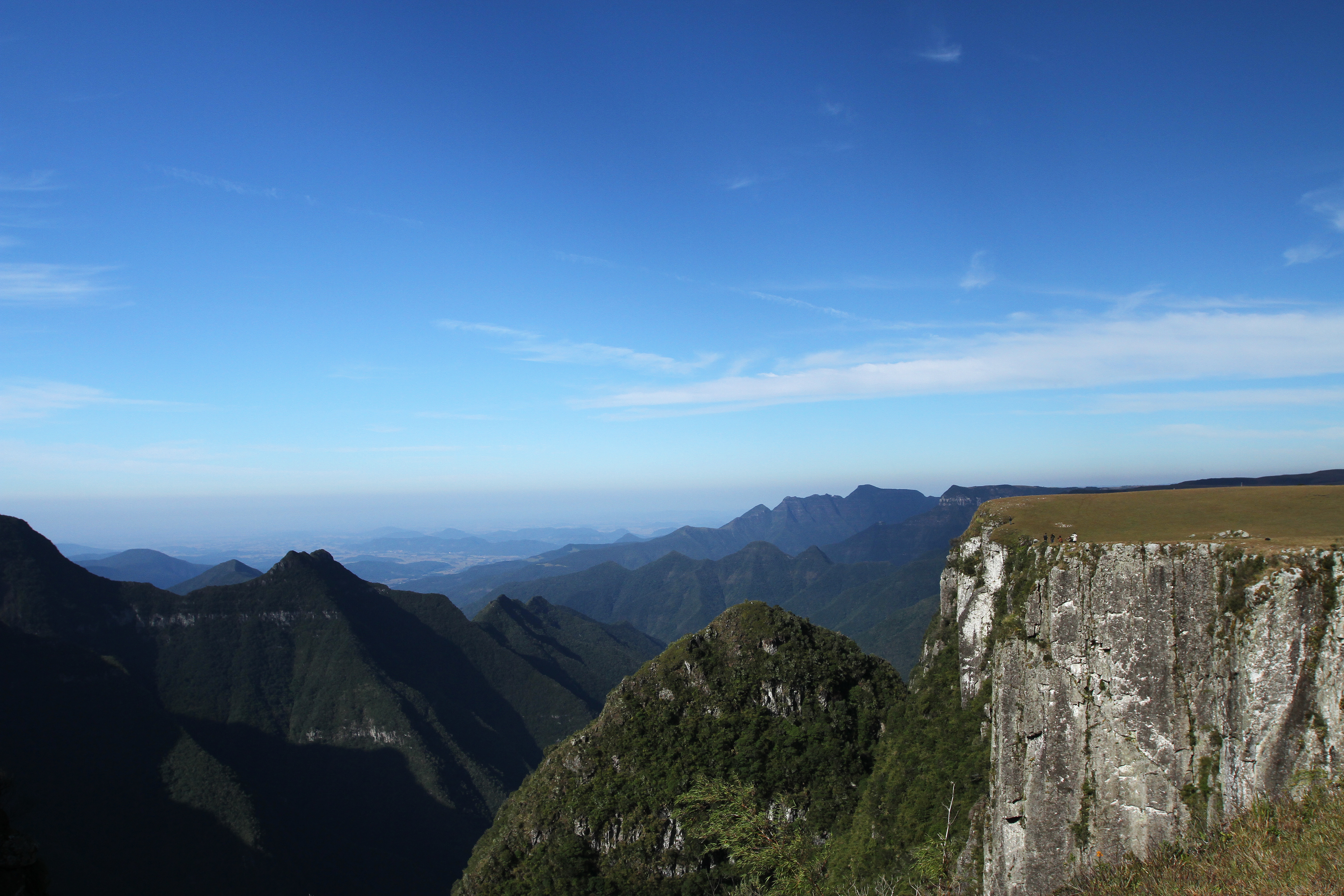
Canyons

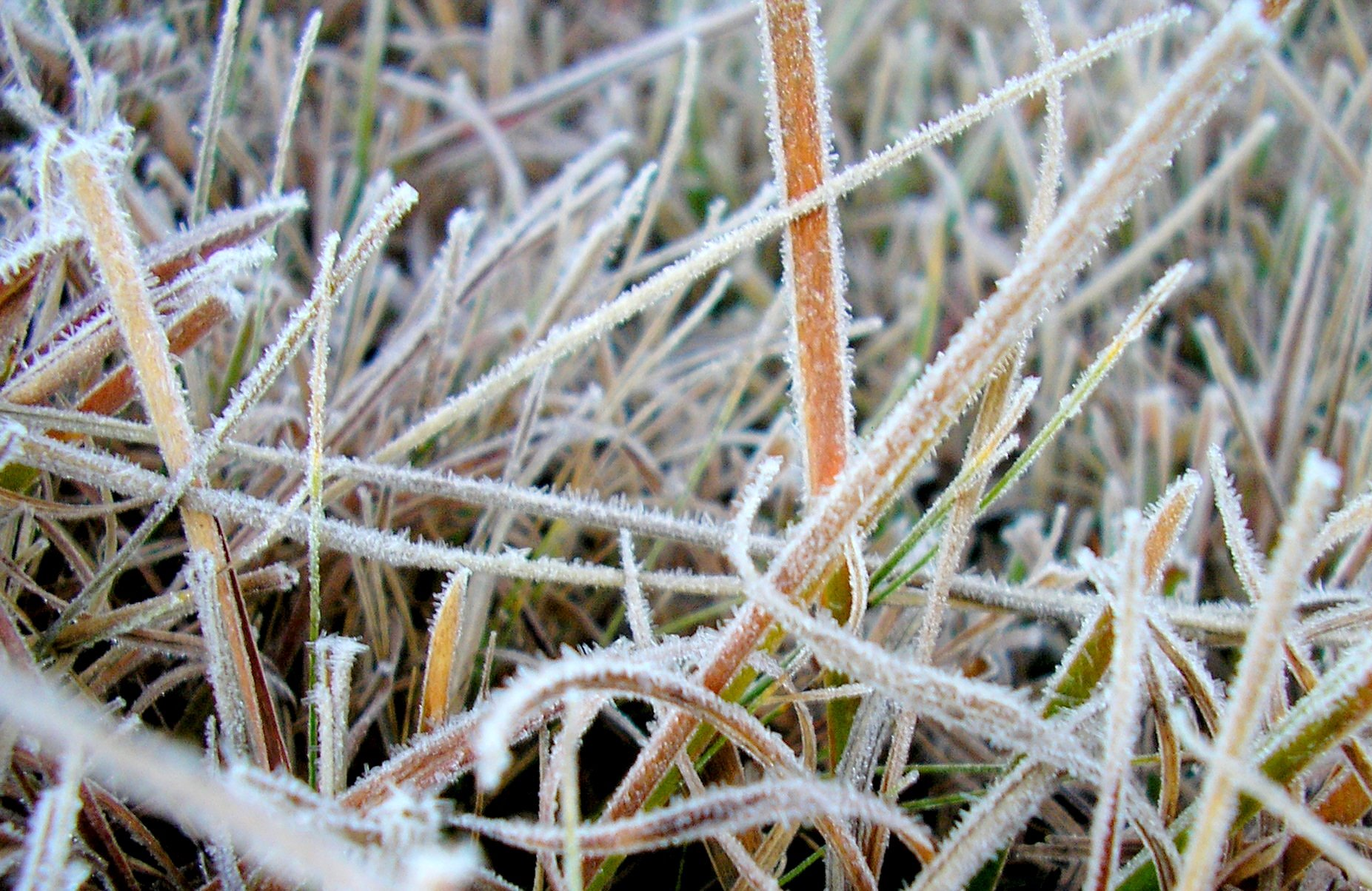
Frost in rural zone's town

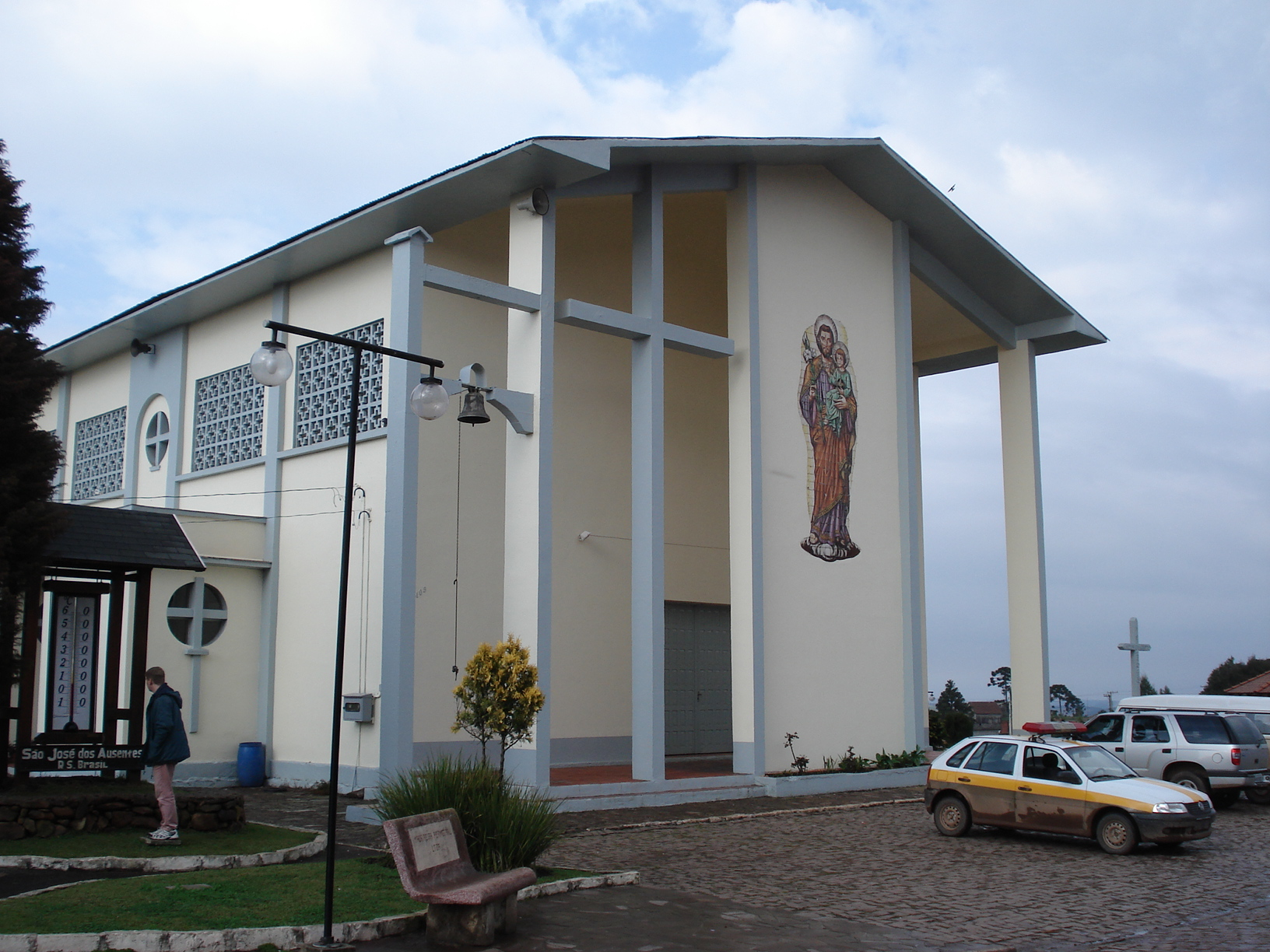
São José dos Ausentes main church

Location in Rio Grande do Sul State

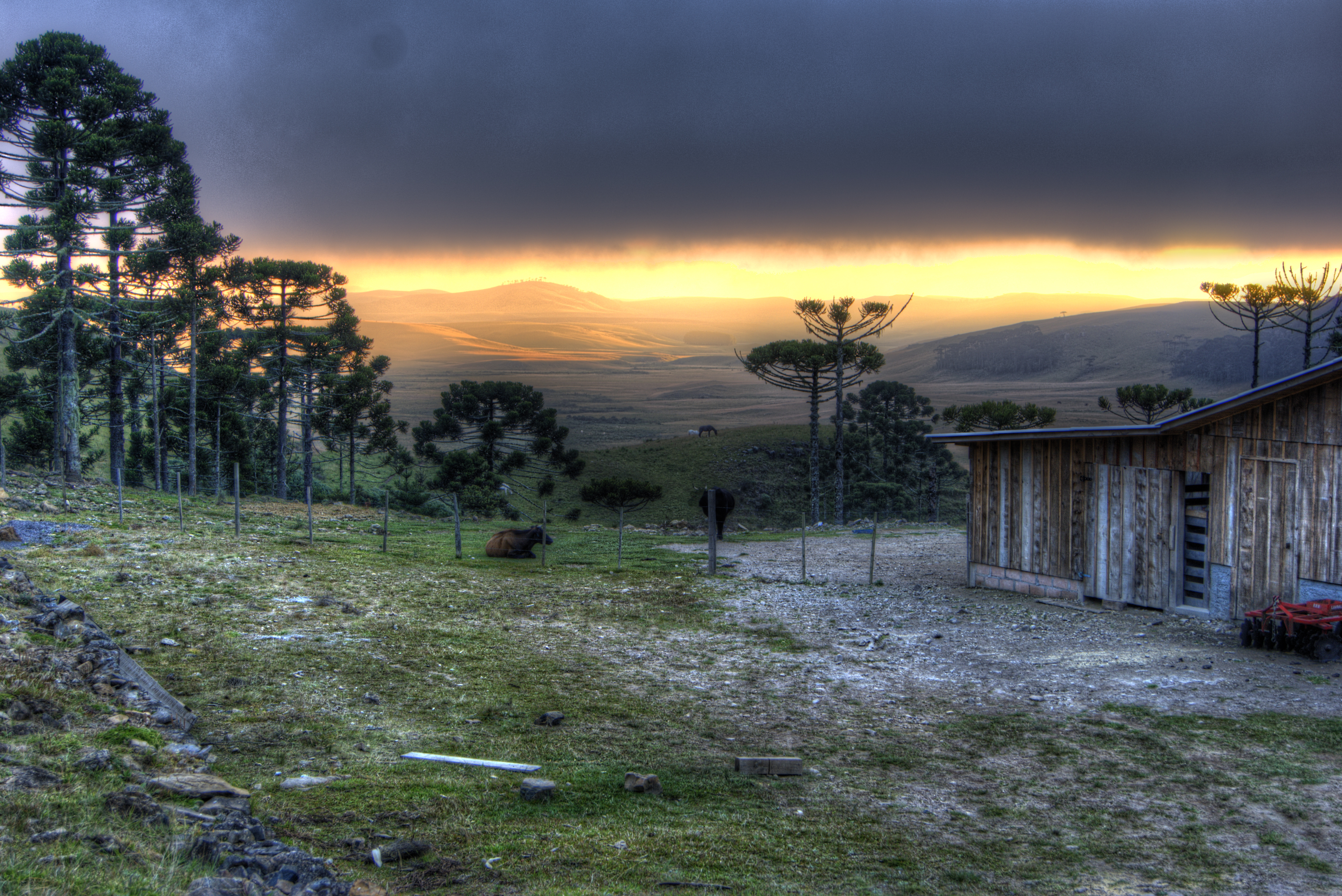
Sunset near Monte Negro Peak

== Geography ==
=== Climate ===
São José dos Ausentes features a temperate oceanic climate (type Cfb), It features an annual uniform precipitation. The Annual average temperature is 13 °C The city is one of the coldest in Brazil and snow precipitation is not uncommon.

Climate data for São José dos Ausentes
Month	Jan	Feb	Mar	Apr	May	Jun	Jul	Aug	Sep	Oct	Nov	Dec	Year
Mean daily maximum °C (°F)	23.8 (74.8)	22.8 (73.0)	20.5 (68.9)	17.9 (64.2)	15.9 (60.6)	15.4 (59.7)	16.0 (60.8)	17.2 (63.0)	18.6 (65.5)	20.2 (68.4)	21.2 (70.2)	22.6 (72.7)	19.7 (67.5)
Daily mean °C (°F)	18.9 (66.0)	18.2 (64.8)	15.9 (60.6)	13.4 (56.1)	11.3 (52.3)	10.7 (51.3)	11.2 (52.2)	12.3 (54.1)	13.6 (56.5)	15.1 (59.2)	16.9 (62.4)	15.7 (60.3)	14.4 (57.9)
Mean daily minimum °C (°F)	14.1 (57.4)	13.6 (56.5)	11.4 (52.5)	8.9 (48.0)	6.8 (44.2)	6.1 (43.0)	6.5 (43.7)	7.4 (45.3)	8.6 (47.5)	10.1 (50.2)	11.8 (53.2)	10.8 (51.4)	9.3 (48.7)
Average precipitation mm (inches)	176 (6.9)	172 (6.8)	145 (5.7)	121 (4.8)	127 (5.0)	135 (5.3)	143 (5.6)	165 (6.5)	171 (6.7)	153 (6.0)	131 (5.2)	134 (5.3)	1,773 (69.8)
Source: Climate Data.

== See also ==
- List of municipalities in Rio Grande do Sul
