= Água Doce =

Coordinates: 26.9978°S 51.5558°W

- Municipality
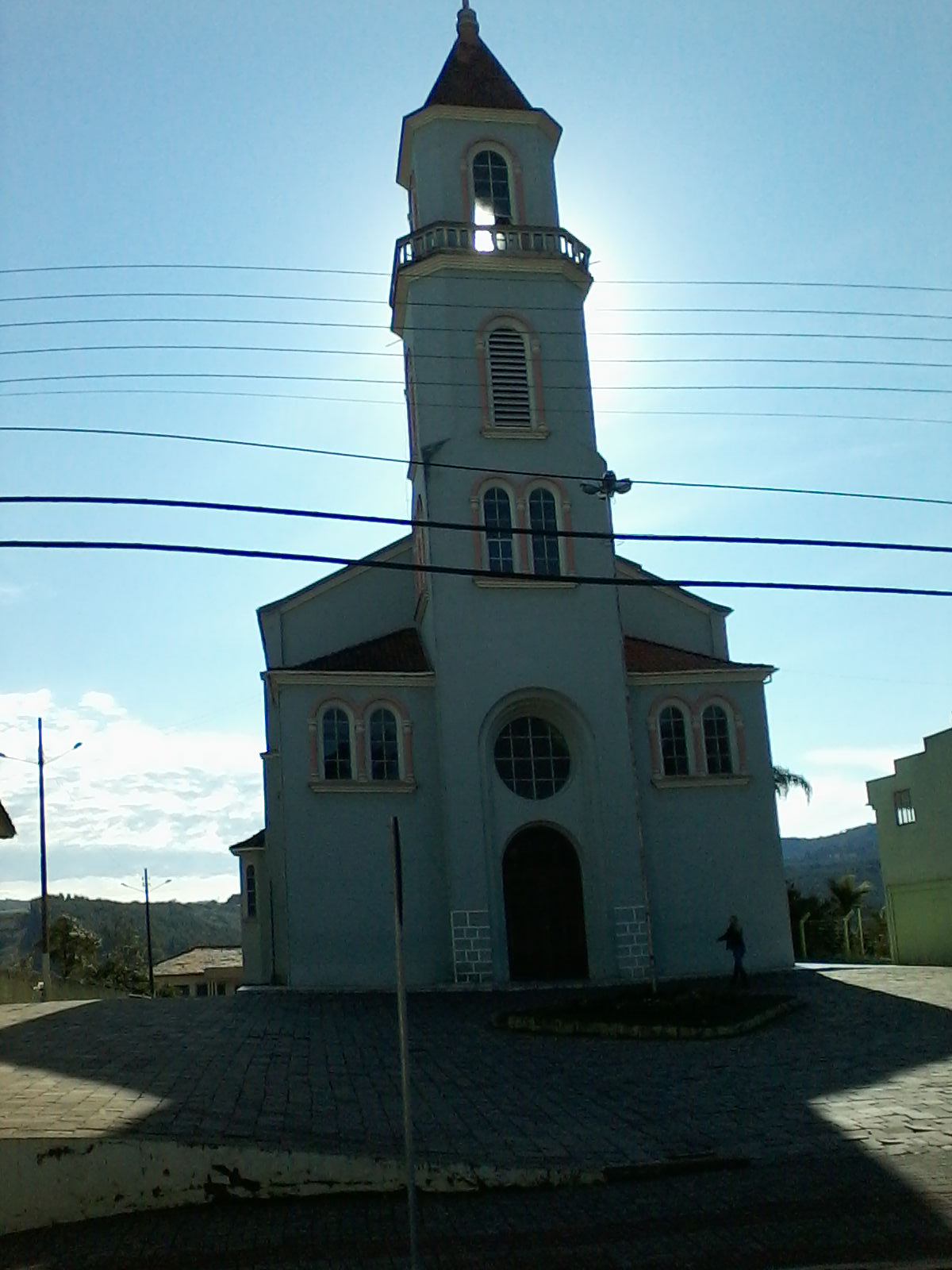

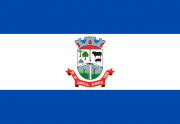
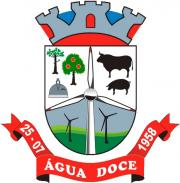
- Flag Coat of arms
- Interactive map of Água Doce
- Country: Brazil
- Region: South
- State: Santa Catarina
- Mesoregion: Oeste Catarinense

Population (2020)
  - Total: 7,152
- Time zone: UTC−3 (BRT)

Água Doce is a municipality in the state of Santa Catarina in the South region of Brazil. The Morro do Capão Doce is situated in its territory.

== See also ==
- List of municipalities in Santa Catarina
