= Pico do Jabre =

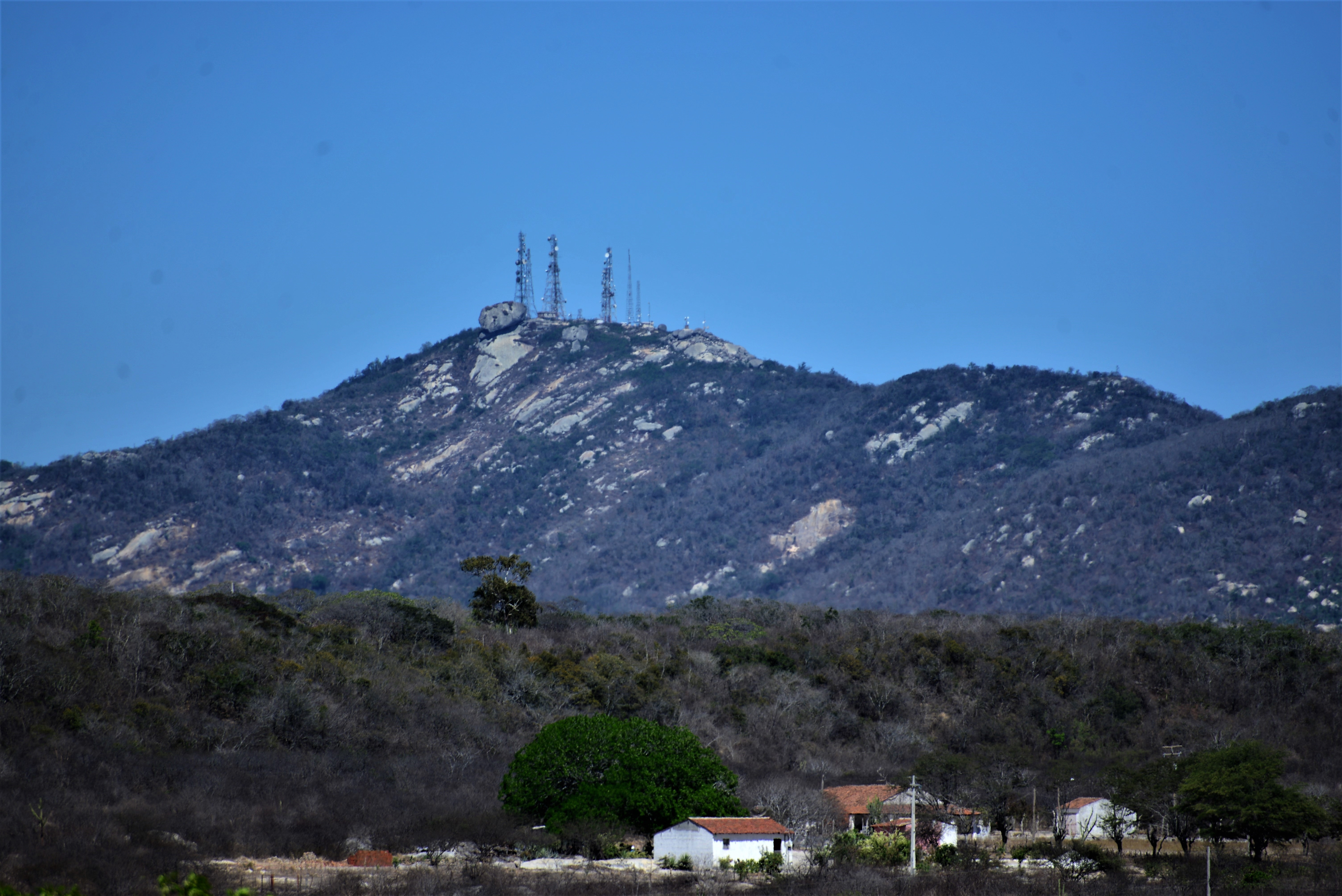

Highest point
- Elevation: 1,208 m (3,963 ft)
- Listing: List of mountains in Brazil
- Coordinates: 7°15′S 37°23′W

Geography
- Location within Brazil
- Location: Paraíba, Brazil
- Parent range: Brazilian Highlands

Pico do Jabre is the highest mountain in the Brazilian state of Paraíba, at 1,208 metres (3,963 ft). It is located in the municipality of Maturéia.

The mountain was declared protected by the 500 hectares (1,200 acres) Pico do Jabre State Park, created in 1992, and later by the 61,095 hectares (159,959 acres) Serra do Teixeira National Park.
