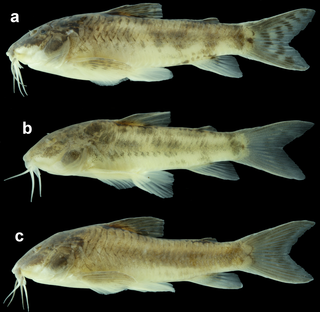

Scientific classification
- Kingdom: Animalia
- Phylum: Chordata
- Class: Actinopterygii
- Order: Siluriformes
- Family: Callichthyidae
- Genus: Aspidoras
- Species: A. mephisto

Binomial name
- Aspidoras mephisto Tencatt & Bichuette, 2017

= Aspidoras mephisto =

Species of fish

Aspidoras mephisto is a species of freshwater ray-finned fish belonging the family Callichthyidae, the armoured catfishes, and the subfamily Corydoradinae, the corys. This species is found in South America where it is endemic to the Anésio-Russão cave system in the upper Tocantins River basin in Goiás, Brazil. This fish is the first species of armoured catfish that is troglobitic.
