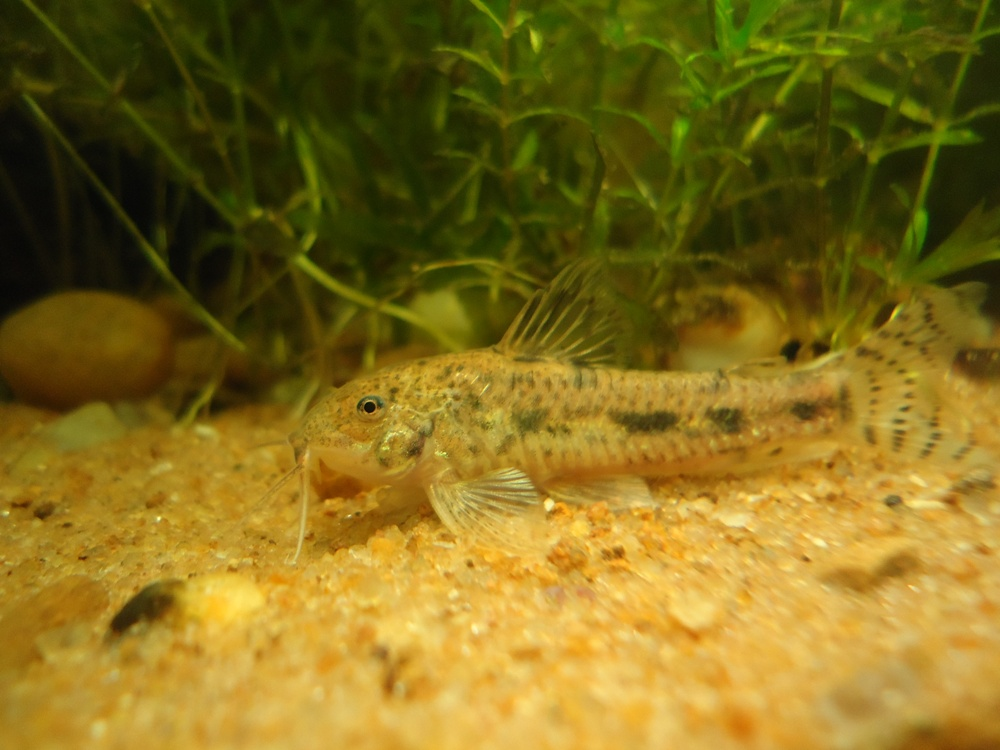

Conservation status
- Least Concern (IUCN 3.1)

Scientific classification
- Kingdom: Animalia
- Phylum: Chordata
- Class: Actinopterygii
- Order: Siluriformes
- Family: Callichthyidae
- Genus: Aspidoras
- Species: A. fuscoguttatus

Binomial name
- Aspidoras fuscoguttatus Nijssen & Isbrücker, 1976

= Aspidoras fuscoguttatus =

Species of fish

Aspidoras fuscoguttatus, the darkspotted catfish or the brown-point shield Skin longirostris, is a species of freshwater ray-finned fish belonging to the family Callychthyidae, the armoured catfishes, and the subfamily Corydoradinae, the corys. This catfish is found in South America where it occurs in the upper Paraná River basin in Brazil.

== In aquariums ==
The fish will grow in length up to 4 centimetres (1.6 inches). It lives in a tropical climate in water with a 5.5–6.8 pH, a water hardness of 12 dGH, and a temperature range of 22 to 25 °C (72 to 77 °F). It feeds on worms, benthic crustaceans, insects, and plant matter. It lays eggs in dense vegetation and adults do not guard the eggs.

It is not very popular in the aquarium trade, probably because it is difficult to distinguish from other related species.

== See also ==
- List of freshwater aquarium fish species
