= Mãe d'Água =

- Municipality
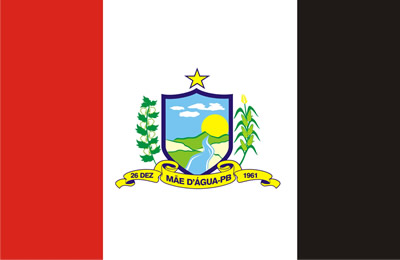
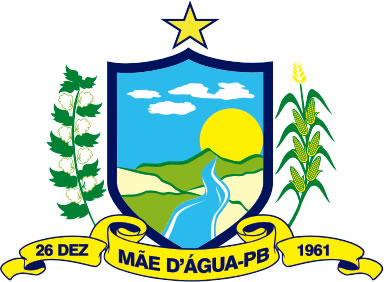
- Flag Coat of arms

- Location in Brazil
- Coordinates: 7°15′32″S 37°25′37″W
- Country: Brazil
- Region: Northeast
- State: Paraíba
- Mesoregion: Sertao Paraibana

Population (2020)
  - Total: 3,999
- Time zone: UTC−3 (BRT)

Mãe d'Água is a municipality in the state of Paraíba in the Northeast Region of Brazil.

The municipality contains a small part of the 500 hectares (1,200 acres) Pico do Jabre State Park, created in 1992.

== See also ==
- List of municipalities in Paraíba
