= Pico da Tijuca =

Mountain in Brazil

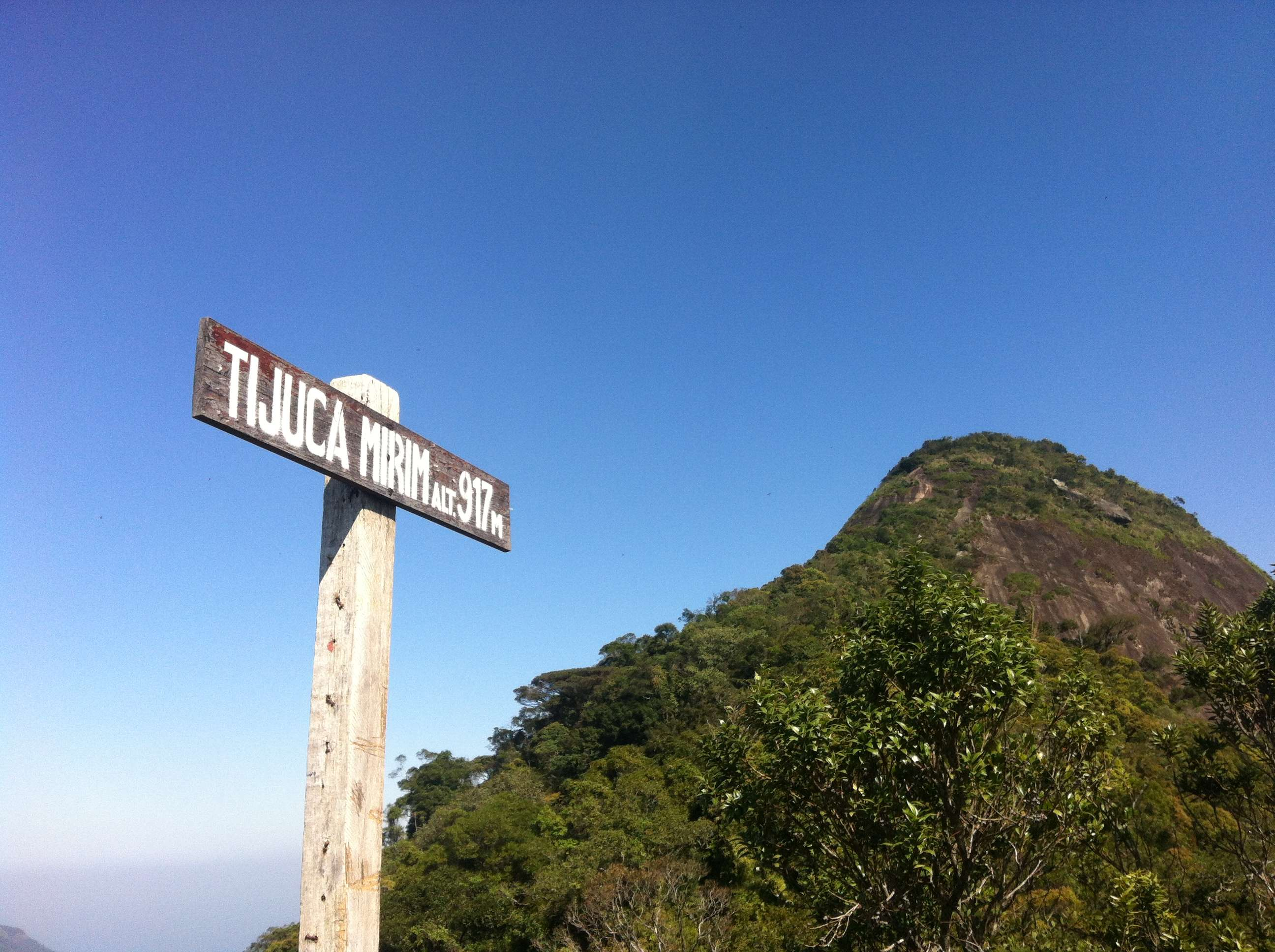

Highest point
- Elevation: 1,022 m (3,353 ft)
- Prominence: 213 m (699 ft)
- Listing: List of mountains in Brazil
- Coordinates: 22°56′37″S 43°17′11″W

Geography
- Location within Brazil
- Location: Rio de Janeiro, Brazil
- Parent range: Serra do Mar

Climbing
- Easiest route: From Rio de Janeiro City

Pico da Tijuca is a mountain in the city of Rio de Janeiro, Brazil.

== Description ==
The mountain is the most prominent peak of the Rio de Janeiro City urban zone. Pico da Tijuca is part of the 3,958.41 hectares (9,781.4 acres) Tijuca National Park protected area, established in 1961. There are stairs cut in the rock to reach the top of the peak.

== See also ==
- List of mountains in Brazil
