= Aspidoras lakoi =

Conservation status
- Least Concern (IUCN 3.1)

Scientific classification
- Kingdom: Animalia
- Phylum: Chordata
- Class: Actinopterygii
- Order: Siluriformes
- Family: Callichthyidae
- Genus: Aspidoras
- Species: A. lakoi

Binomial name
- Aspidoras lakoi P. Miranda-Ribeiro, 1949

Species of fish

Aspidoras lakoi, the chessboard catfish, is a species of freshwater ray-finned fish belonging to the family Callichthyidae, the armoured catfishes, and the subfamily Corydoradinae. This catfish is found in South America, where it is endemic to the upper Paraná River basin in Brazil.

The fish will grow in length up to 4.0 centimetres (1.6 inches). It feeds on worms, benthic crustaceans, insects, and plant matter. It lays eggs in dense vegetation and adults do not guard the eggs.

== See also ==
- List of freshwater aquarium fish species
