= Aspidoras depinnai =

Conservation status
- Least Concern (IUCN 3.1)

Scientific classification
- Kingdom: Animalia
- Phylum: Chordata
- Class: Actinopterygii
- Order: Siluriformes
- Family: Callichthyidae
- Genus: Aspidoras
- Species: A. depinnai

Binomial name
- Aspidoras depinnai Britto, 2000

Species of fish

Aspidoras depinnai, the Ipojuca catfish, is a species of freshwater ray-finned fish belonging to the family Callichthyidae, the armoured catfishes, and the subfamily Corydoradinae. This catfish is found in the Ipojuca River basin of Brazil. It belongs to the subfamily Corydoradinae of the family Callichthyidae. It grows to a length of 3.3 cm.
