= Pico Alto =

Mountain in Brazil

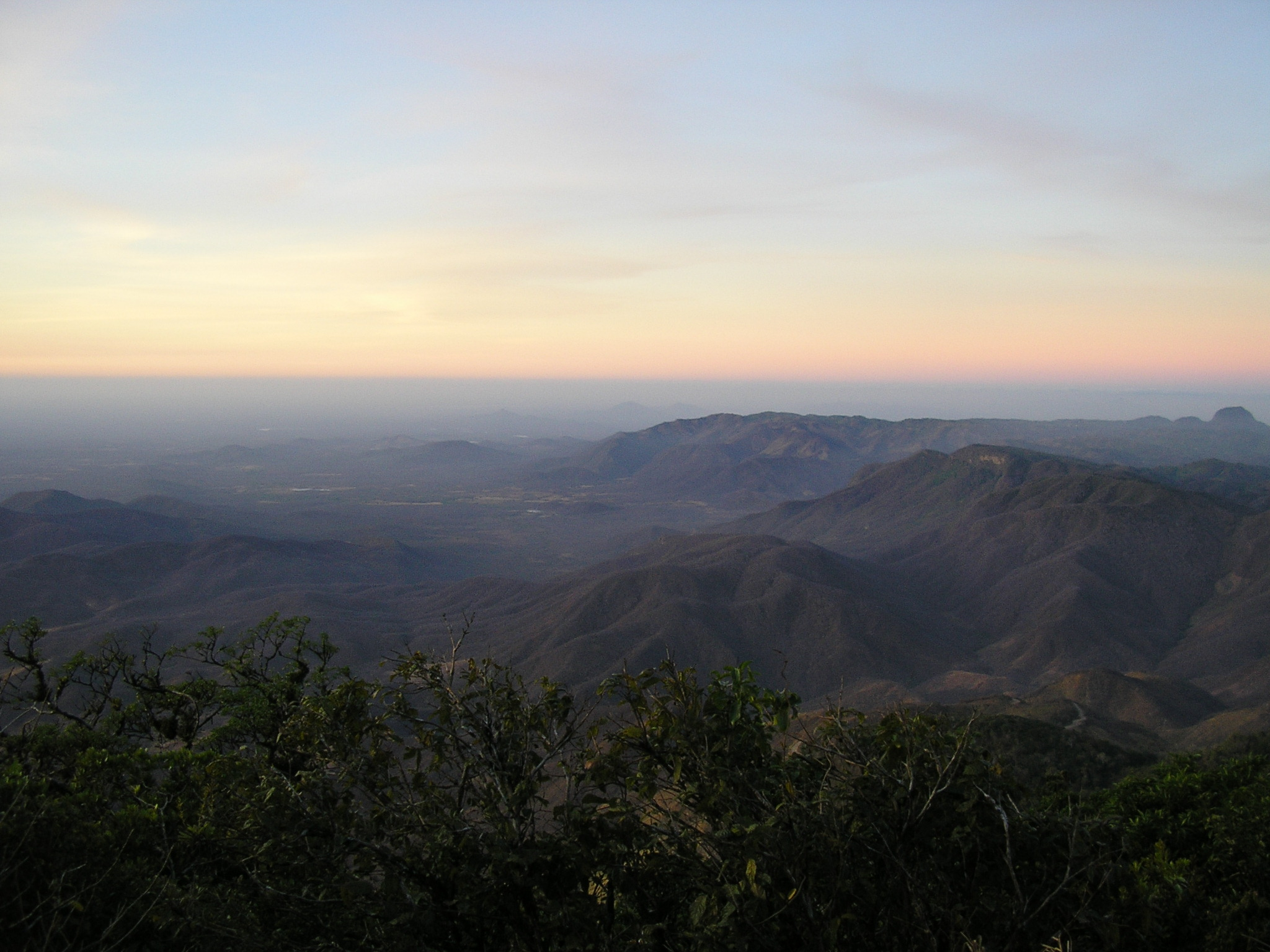
- Pico Alto and the Baturité mountain range

Highest point
- Elevation: 1,114 m (3,655 ft)
- Listing: List of mountains in Brazil
- Coordinates: 4°12′30″S 38°58′29″W

Naming
- English translation: High Peak
- Language of name: Portuguese

Geography
- Location within Brazil
- Location: Ceará, Brazil
- Parent range: Serra de Baturité

Pico Alto (English: High Peak) is the highest mountain in the Brazilian state of Ceará, reaching 1,114 metres (3,655 ft). It is located in the city of Guaramiranga, and is part of the Maciço de Baturité.
