= Itapicuru River =

River in Bahia, Brazil

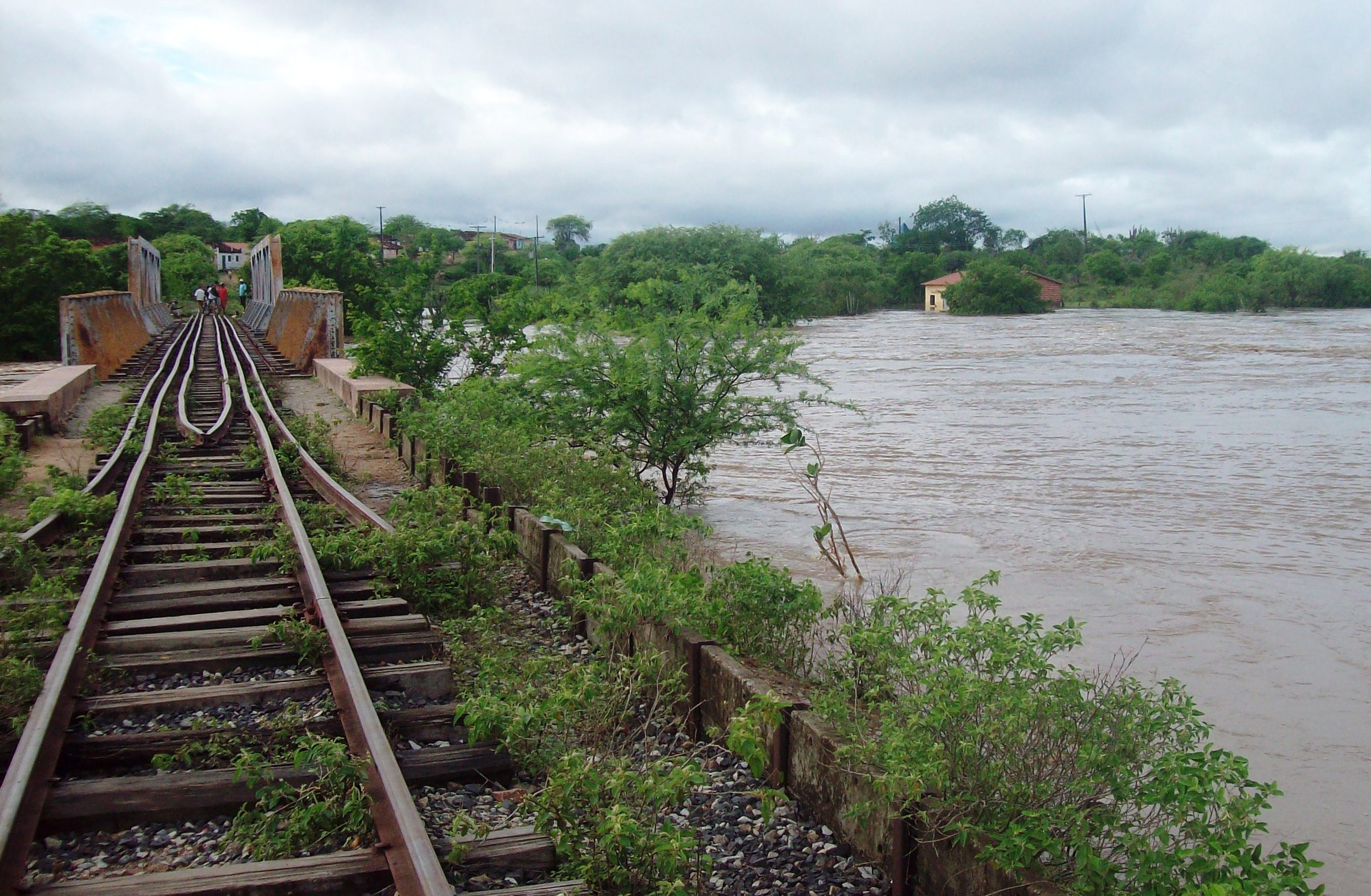

- Location of mouth

Location
- Country: Brazil

Physical characteristics
- Source
  - location: Amapá state
- Mouth: Atlantic Ocean
  - coordinates: 11°47′S 37°32′W

The Itapicuru River is a river in Bahia state of eastern Brazil. The Itapicuru rises in the northern part of the state, and flows east to empty into the Atlantic Ocean. The river’s total length is approximately 750 miles (1,200 km), of which about 400 miles (640 km) are navigable by boat.
