= Pico do Papagaio =

- Location within Brazil

Highest point
- Elevation: 1,260 m (4,130 ft)
- Listing: Brazilian state high point
- Coordinates: 7°49′12.98″S 38°03′22.05″W

Geography
- Location: Pernambuco, Brazil

Pico do Papagaio is the highest mountain in the Brazilian state of Pernambuco, at 1,260 metres (4,134 ft).
