= List of tunnels in Brazil =

This is a list of tunnels in Brazil.

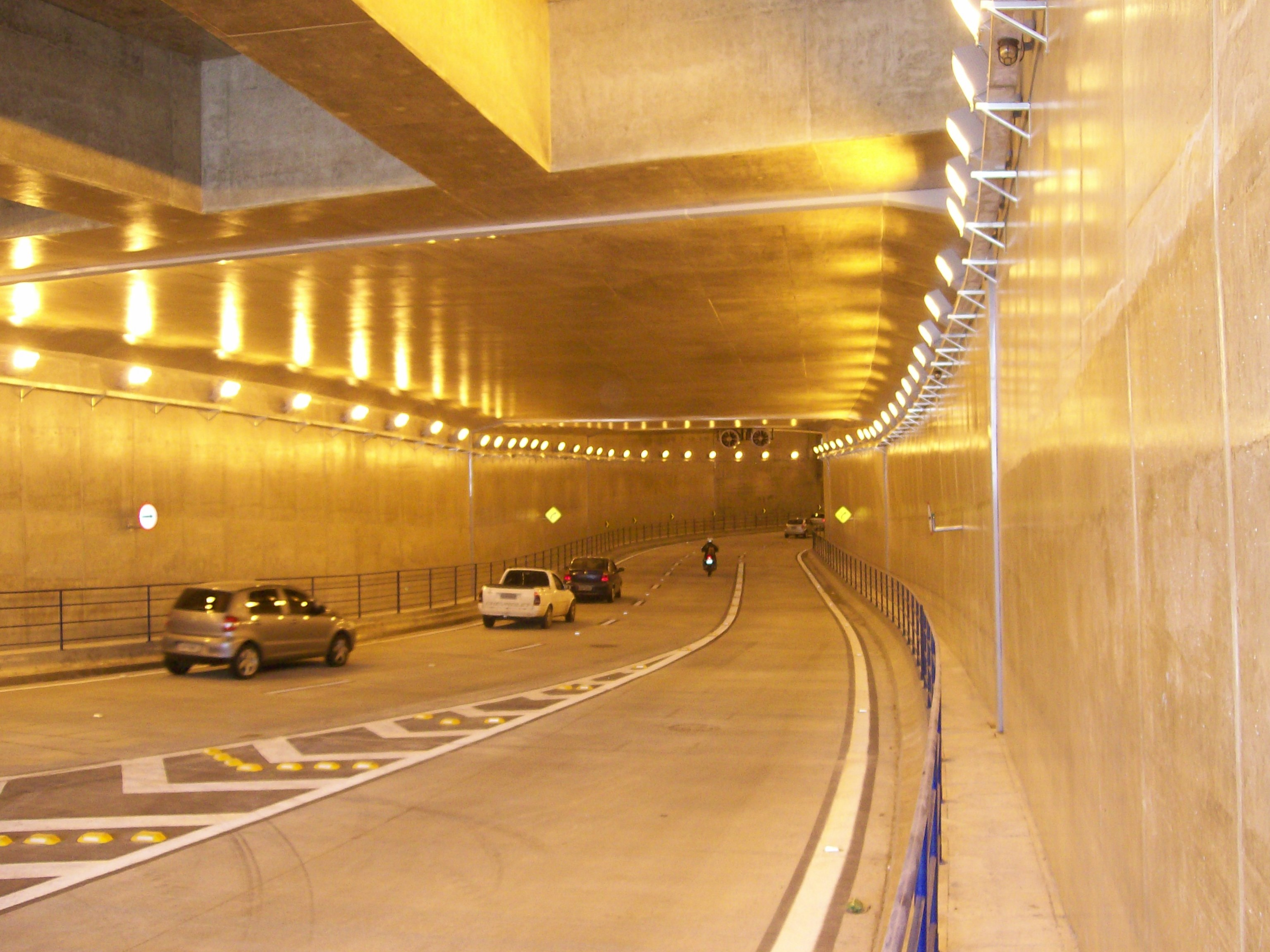
Tunnel in Campinas, Brazil

== Pernambuco ==
- Plínio Pacheco (Cascavel) 370 m 2007

== Rio de Janeiro ==
- Rua Alice 220 m 1887
- Alaor Prata 182 m 1892
- Engenheiro Coelho Cintra 250 m 1906
- João Ricardo 0293 m 1921
- Engenheiro Marques Porto 0250 m 1949
- Sá Freire Alvim 0326 m 1960
- Major Rubens Vaz 0220 m 1963
- Santa Bárbara 1357 m 1963
- Rebouças 2800 m
- Acústico 0550 m 1971
- Zuzu Angel 1590 m 1971
- São Conrado 0260 m 1971
- Joá 426 m 1971
- Martim de Sá 0304 m 1977
- Noel Rosa 0720 m
- Eng. Raimundo de Paula Soares 2187 m 1997
- Eng. Enaldo Cravo Peixoto 0153 m 1997
- Geólogo Enzo Totis 0165 m 1997
- Mergulhão Praça XV 0100 m 1997
- Grota Funda TransOeste 2012
