= Pico do Jabre State Park =

State park in Paraíba, Brazil

- Parque Estadual Pico do Jabre
- IUCN category II (national park)
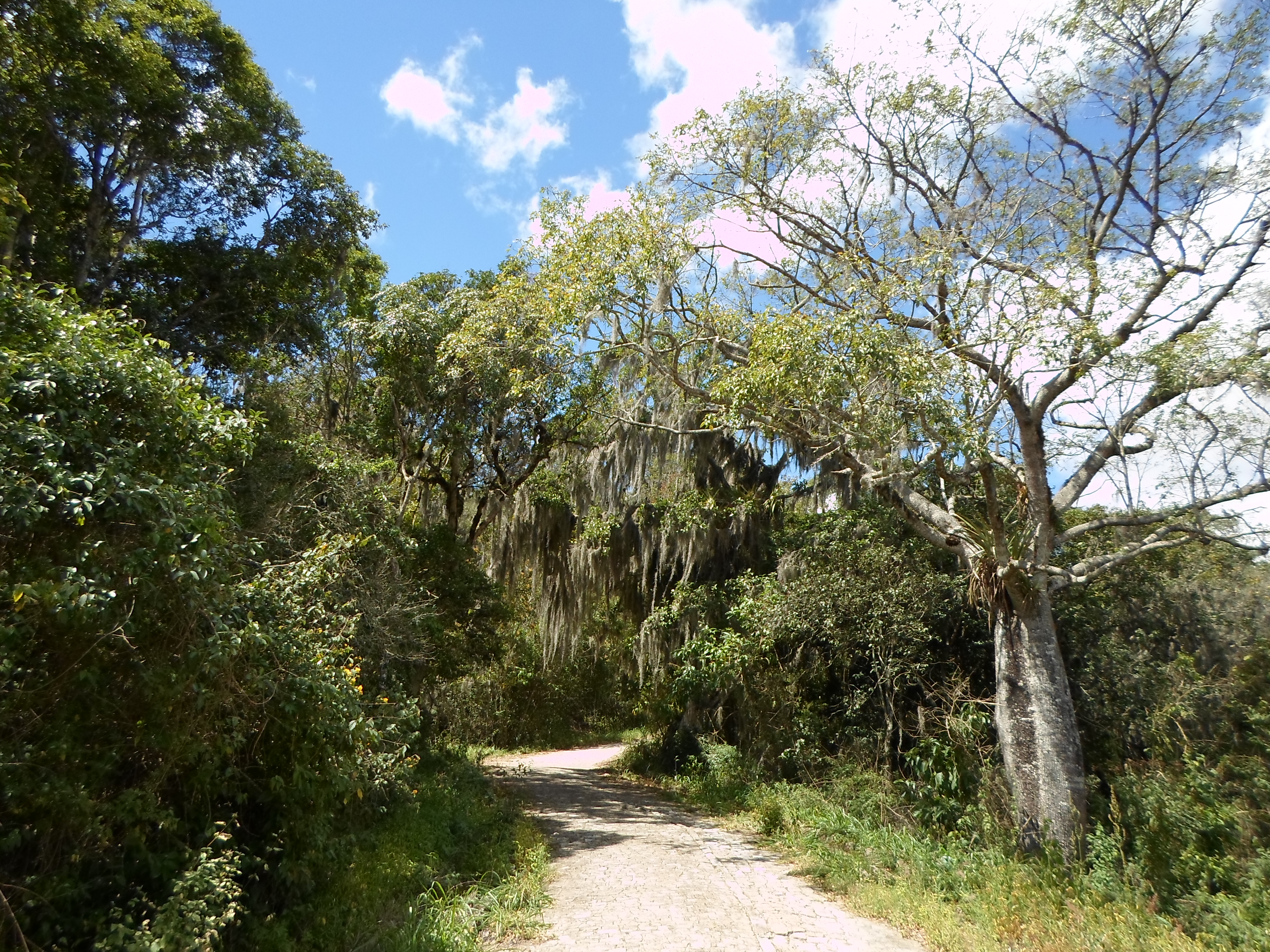
- Flora

- Location within Brazil
- Nearest city: Matureia, Paraíba
- Coordinates: 7°15′10″S 37°23′06″W
- Area: 500 ha (1,200 acres)
- Designation: State park
- Created: 19 October 1992
- Administrator: Sudema - Superintendência de Administração do Meio Ambiente da Paraíba

The Pico do Jabre State Park (Portuguese: Parque Estadual Pico do Jabre) is a state park in the state of Paraíba, Brazil. It protects the highest peak in northeast Brazil, with a unique montane forest ecosystem combining Atlantic Forest and caatinga elements.

== Location ==
The Pico do Jabre State Park is in the Paraíba municipalities of Matureia and Mãe d'Água. It has an area of about 500 hectares (1,200 acres). Most of the park is in Matureia. The surrounding terrain is undulating, with altitudes from 750 to 1,000 metres (2,460 to 3,280 ft). The Pico do Jabre rises to 1,197 metres (3,927 ft), and is the highest peak of the six northeast states of Pernambuco, Paraíba, Rio Grande do Norte, Piauí, Ceará and Maranhão.

== History ==
The Pico do Jabre State Park was created through decree 14.843 of 19 October 1992 with an area of about 500 hectares (1,200 acres) with great natural diversity of flora, fauna and rocky outcrops. Objectives were to reconcile protection of fauna, flora and landscape with scientific research and recreation. It is administered by the Environmental Management Superintendency of Paraíba (Sudema).

In April 2016 the public prosecutor's office filed a public civil action against the cellular operators Tim, Oi and Embratel, and against 24 owners of property on the Pico do Jabre. The prosecutor said that the property owners had ignored the fact that the area had been declared of public utility for the purpose of expropriation, and had continued illegal construction, causing irreversible environmental damage to a unique ecosystem. Among other actions, the action called for demolition of all buildings and structures in the area of permanent preservation, followed by recovery of the environment and payment for damages.

== Environment ==
The region has a Köppen climate classification of Aw: hot and humid, with rain in the summer and autumn. Average annual rainfall is 746 millimetres (29.4 in), mostly falling in the period from February to May. Average annual temperature is around 21 °C (70 °F). Vegetation includes humid forest species with elements of caatinga, which predominate in the surroundings. The vegetation is the only example of montane forest in the Atlantic Forest domain of Paraíba. Species such as angico (Mimosoideae), Cedrus, Amburana, quixabeira (Sideroxylon obtusifolium) and aroeira (Anacardiaceae) stand out.

== Sources ==
- "MP pede demolição de estruturas construídas no Pico do Jabre, na PB", G1 Globo (in Portuguese), 28 April 2016
- Parque Estadual Pico do Jabre (in Portuguese), Via Rural, archived from the original on July 10, 2009
- Ramalho, A.M.C.; Oliveira, C.A.A.; Morais, P.S.A.; Costa, S.O.P. (2009), "Impactos ambientais culturais e estéticos no Parque Estadual do Pico do Jabre, Matureia (PB)", Revista Brasileira de Ecoturismo (in Portuguese), 2 (1), São Paulo, archived from the original on 2017-01-13
