= Matureia =

Coordinates: 7.26694°S 37.3508°W

- Municipality
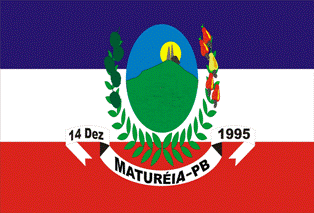
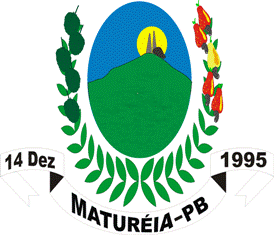
- Flag Coat of arms

- Country: Brazil
- Region: Northeast
- State: Paraíba
- Mesoregion: Sertao Paraibana

Area
  - Total: 32.322 sq mi (83.714 km^{2})

Population (2020)
  - Total: 6,630
- Time zone: UTC−3 (BRT)

Matureia (formerly Maturéia) is a municipality in the state of Paraíba in the Northeast Region of Brazil. The city is located in the Teixeira ridge region at an altitude of 860 meters (2,674 ft)

The municipality contains the larger part of the 500-hectare (1,200-acre) Pico do Jabre State Park, created in 1992.

== See also ==
- List of municipalities in Paraíba
