= Serra Santa Cruz =

Mountain range in Alagoas, Brazil

Coordinates: 9°07′50″S 37°46′01″W

The Serra Santa Cruz is a Brazilian mountain range in the state of Alagoas. It has the highest point in that state, reaching 844 metres (2,769 ft).
