= Maciço do Urucum =

- Morro do Urucum
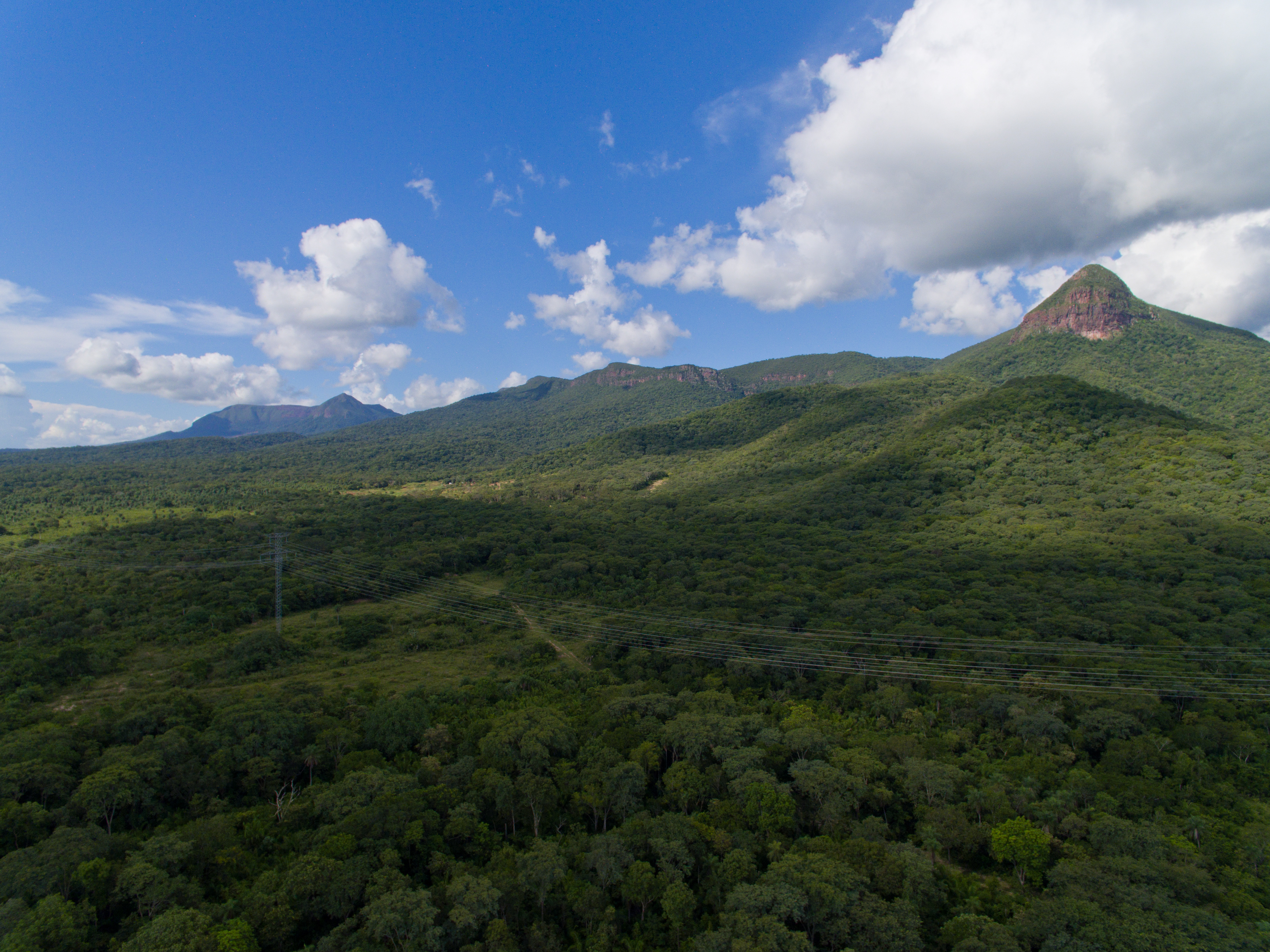

Highest point
- Elevation: 1,065 m (3,494 ft)
- Listing: List of mountains in Brazil
- Coordinates: 19°12′S 57°36′W

Geography
- Location within Brazil
- Location: Mato Grosso do Sul, Brazil

Maciço do Urucum ("Urucum Massif"), also known as Morro do Urucum ("Urucum Hill") is a mountain in southern Brazil, south of the city of Corumbá, Mato Grosso do Sul. It is the highest mountain in the state, reaching 1,065 metres (3,494 ft). The rock formation is mined for manganese by Rio Tinto Group and Vale do Rio Doce.
