= Morro do Capão Doce =

Hill in Paraná and Santa Catarina, Brazil

- Location within Brazil

Highest point
- Elevation: 1,340 m (4,400 ft)
- Coordinates: 26°44′S 51°26′W

Naming
- Language of name: Brazilian Portuguese

Geography
- Location: Santa Catarina, Paraná, Brazil
- Parent range: Brazilian Highlands

Morro do Capão Doce is a hill in southern Brazil located between the states of Paraná and Santa Catarina. It reaches a height of 1,340 metres (4,396 ft) and consists of a rounded elevation, rising above the surrounding land and has local relief of less than 300m. Its drainage basins include the Paraná, Rio de la Plata and the Atlantic Ocean.
