= Guaramiranga =

Municipality in Ceará, Brazil

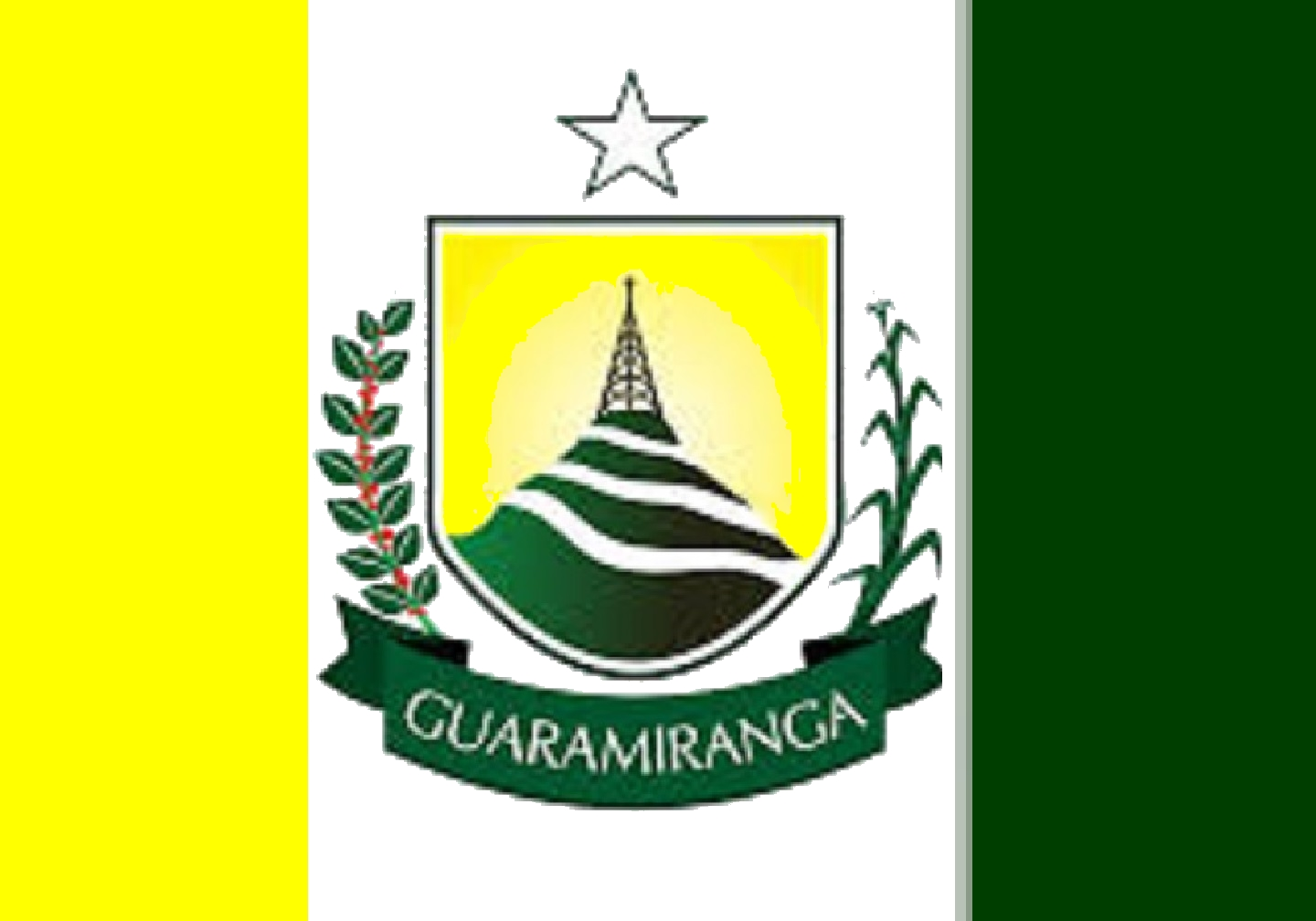
- Flag
- Nickname: City of flowers
- Location of Guaramiranga in the State of Ceará
- Coordinates: 04°15′46″S 38°55′58″W
- Country: Brazil
- Region: Northeast
- State: Ceará
- Founded: September 1, 1890

Government
  - Mayor: Ynara Furtado Vasconcelos Mota (Republicanos, 2025–2028)

Area
  - Total: 90.817 km^{2} (35.065 sq mi)
- Elevation: 865 m (2,838 ft)

Population (2020)
  - Total: 5,132
  - Density: 56.51/km^{2} (146.4/sq mi)
- Demonym: guaramiranguense
- Time zone: UTC−3 (BRT)
- HDI (2000): 0.654 – medium
- Website: www.guaramiranga.ce.gov.br/

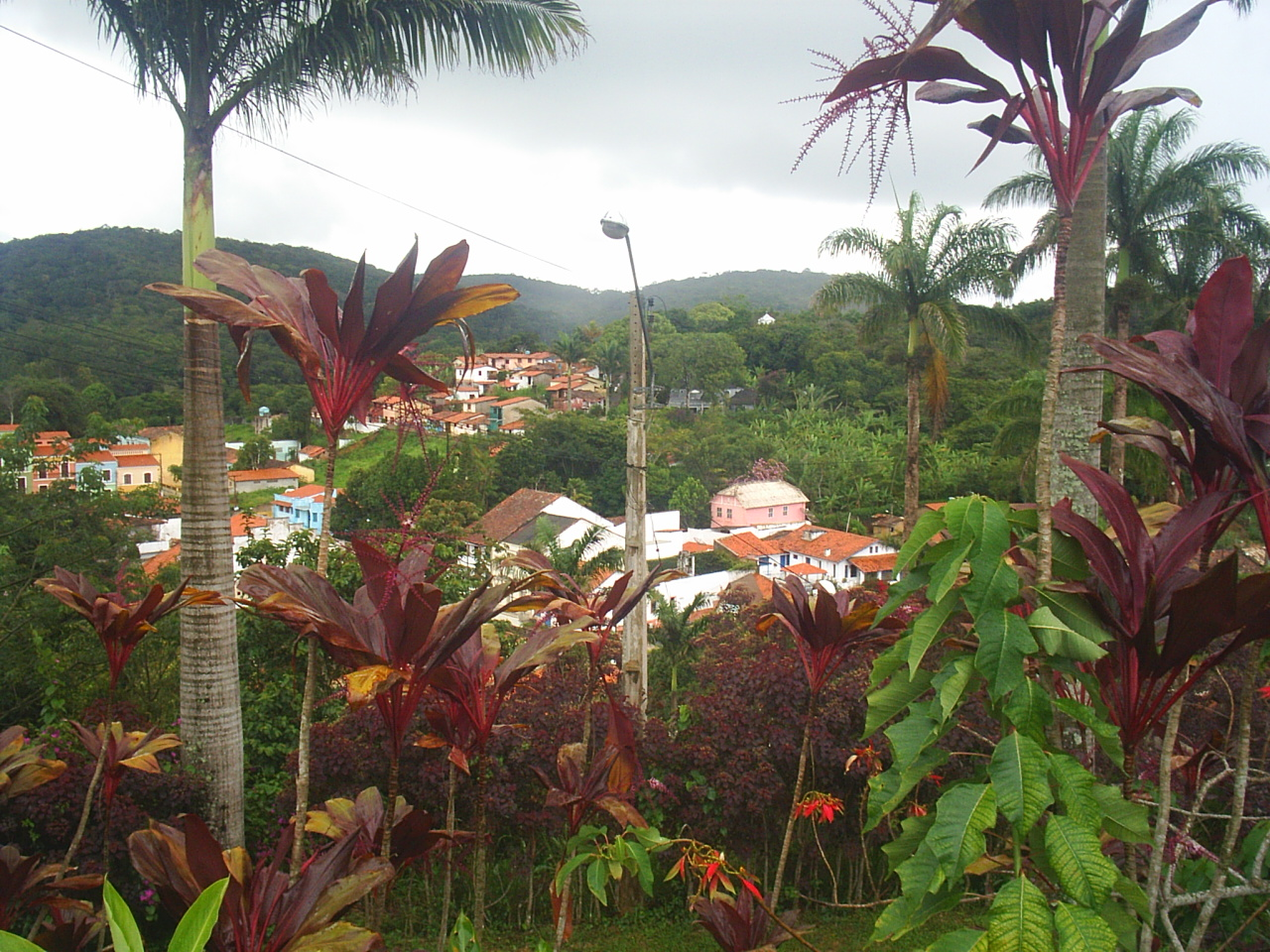
Image of Guaramiranga

Flora of Guaramiranga

Guaramiranga is one of the smallest towns of the Northeastern state of Ceará in Brazil. It is located at an altitude of 865 m in the Serra de Baturité hills 110 km from the state capital of Fortaleza. Guaramiranga is known locally for its temperate climate and lush green scenery. The temperature in Guaramiranga varies between 15 and 23 degrees Celsius through the year.

Guaramiranga has a population of about 5,132 people. The town was first populated by an Indian tribe called the Tarariús towards the end of the 19th century. It hosts a number of events throughout the year including a Festival of Jazz&Blues which is held every year during Carnival, and the Ceará Fest Flores which is held in November. It has two large churches, the Igreja Matriz Nossa Senhora da Conceição and the Igreja Nossa Senhora de Lourdes.

The town is the birthplace of the scientist and researcher Fernando de Mendonça, founder of Brazil's National Institute for Space Research. It also has an aeronautic museum with a Embraer AT-26 Xavante in its entrance, from the former 1973 to 2018 group, and a Restaurant and Hotel Vale das Nuvens.

Within its territory, lies the Pico Alto, the highest point of Ceará.

== Climate ==
Guaramiranga experiences a tropical savanna climate (Köppen: Aw). Temperatures throughout the year are warm, and are moderated by the altitude. The town experiences a wet season from January to July, and a dry season from August to December.

Climate data for Guaramiranga (1991–2020)
| Month | Jan | Feb | Mar | Apr | May | Jun | Jul | Aug | Sep | Oct | Nov | Dec | Year |
|---|---|---|---|---|---|---|---|---|---|---|---|---|---|
| Mean daily maximum °C (°F) | 26.2 (79.2) | 25.5 (77.9) | 25.2 (77.4) | 24.7 (76.5) | 24.5 (76.1) | 24.0 (75.2) | 24.4 (75.9) | 25.9 (78.6) | 27.0 (80.6) | 27.4 (81.3) | 27.3 (81.1) | 27.1 (80.8) | 25.8 (78.4) |
| Daily mean °C (°F) | 21.3 (70.3) | 21.3 (70.3) | 21.3 (70.3) | 21.2 (70.2) | 21.0 (69.8) | 20.3 (68.5) | 20.0 (68.0) | 20.3 (68.5) | 20.7 (69.3) | 21.0 (69.8) | 21.2 (70.2) | 21.5 (70.7) | 20.9 (69.6) |
| Mean daily minimum °C (°F) | 19.0 (66.2) | 19.1 (66.4) | 19.1 (66.4) | 19.2 (66.6) | 18.9 (66.0) | 18.1 (64.6) | 17.4 (63.3) | 17.3 (63.1) | 17.5 (63.5) | 18.0 (64.4) | 18.5 (65.3) | 18.9 (66.0) | 18.4 (65.1) |
| Average precipitation mm (inches) | 184.1 (7.25) | 170.7 (6.72) | 274.5 (10.81) | 294.2 (11.58) | 209.4 (8.24) | 177.8 (7.00) | 105.6 (4.16) | 38.2 (1.50) | 23.3 (0.92) | 29.4 (1.16) | 36.1 (1.42) | 63.1 (2.48) | 1,606.4 (63.24) |
| Average precipitation days (≥ 1.0 mm) | 15.3 | 15.4 | 21.8 | 21.4 | 16.7 | 13.0 | 8.8 | 5.1 | 5.3 | 6.9 | 7.3 | 8.8 | 145.8 |
| Average relative humidity (%) | 86.5 | 88.6 | 90.7 | 92.0 | 91.3 | 89.4 | 88.2 | 82.7 | 82.1 | 81.3 | 82.6 | 83.9 | 86.6 |
| Mean monthly sunshine hours | 123.0 | 91.3 | 76.6 | 73.3 | 115.3 | 126.1 | 163.0 | 203.7 | 192.0 | 198.8 | 175.0 | 165.5 | 1,703.6 |
Source: NOAA
