= Pico Paraná =

Mountain in Paraná, Brazil

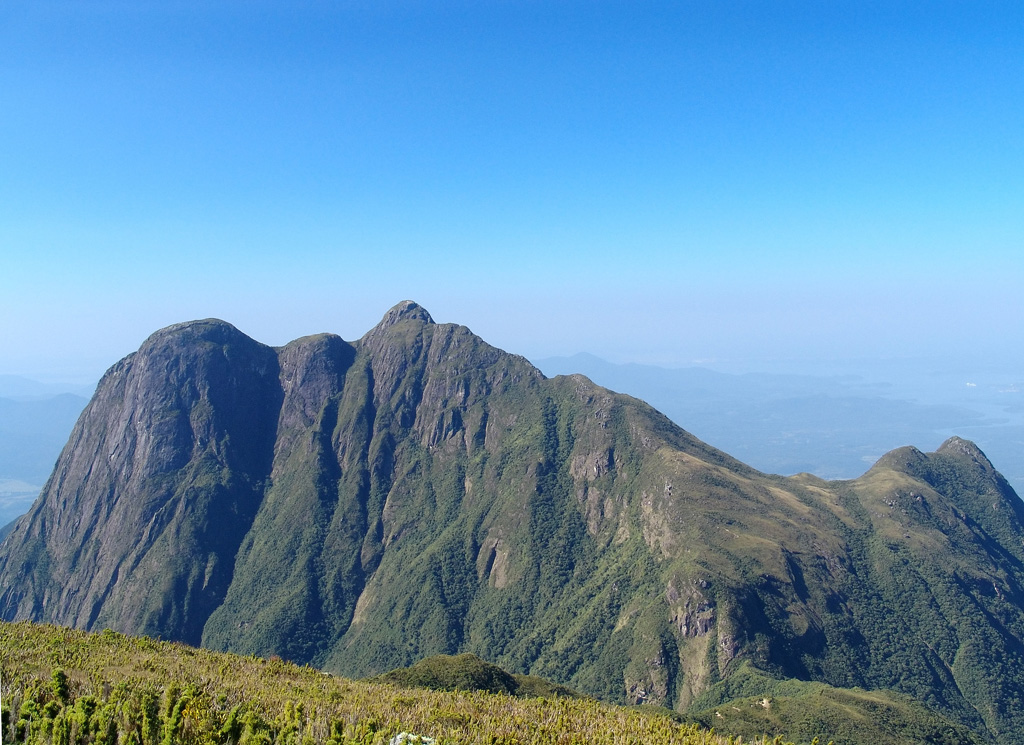
- Pico Paraná from Pico Caratuva

Highest point
- Elevation: 1,877 m (6,158 ft)
- Listing: Brazilian state high point
- Coordinates: 25°14′S 48°48′W

Geography
- Location within Brazil
- Location: City of Antonina, State of Paraná, Brazil
- Parent range: Serra do Mar

Climbing
- Easiest route: From "Fazenda Pico Paraná"

Pico Paraná is the highest mountain in the Brazilian state of Paraná and in all Southern Brazil. It is composed of granite and gneiss. It was discovered by German explorer Reinhard Maack. Although this area has been previously inhabited by indigenous population Tupi Guarani. He also made the first ascent of the mountain, together with Rudolf Stamm and Alfred Mysing. The official height was obtained in 1992 by three teams from the Federal University of Paraná, using the Global Positioning System.

The Pico Paraná and the surrounding peaks of the Paraná section of the Serra do Mar, is protected by the Pico Paraná State Park.

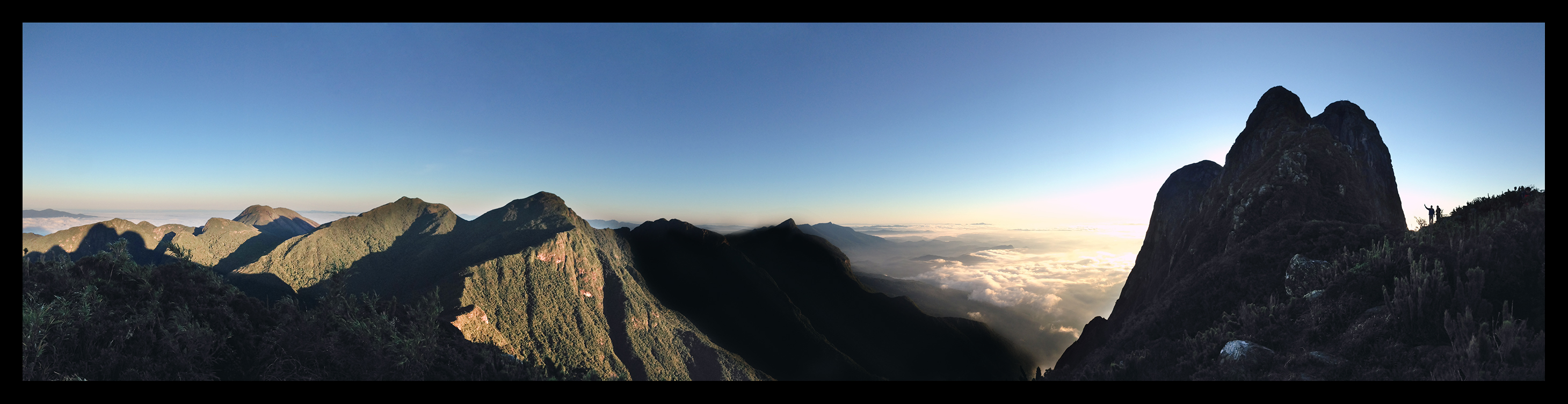
Panoramic of Ibitiraquire Range, with the Parana Peak highlighted.
