= Pico do Monte Negro =

Mountain in Rio Grande do Sul, Brazil

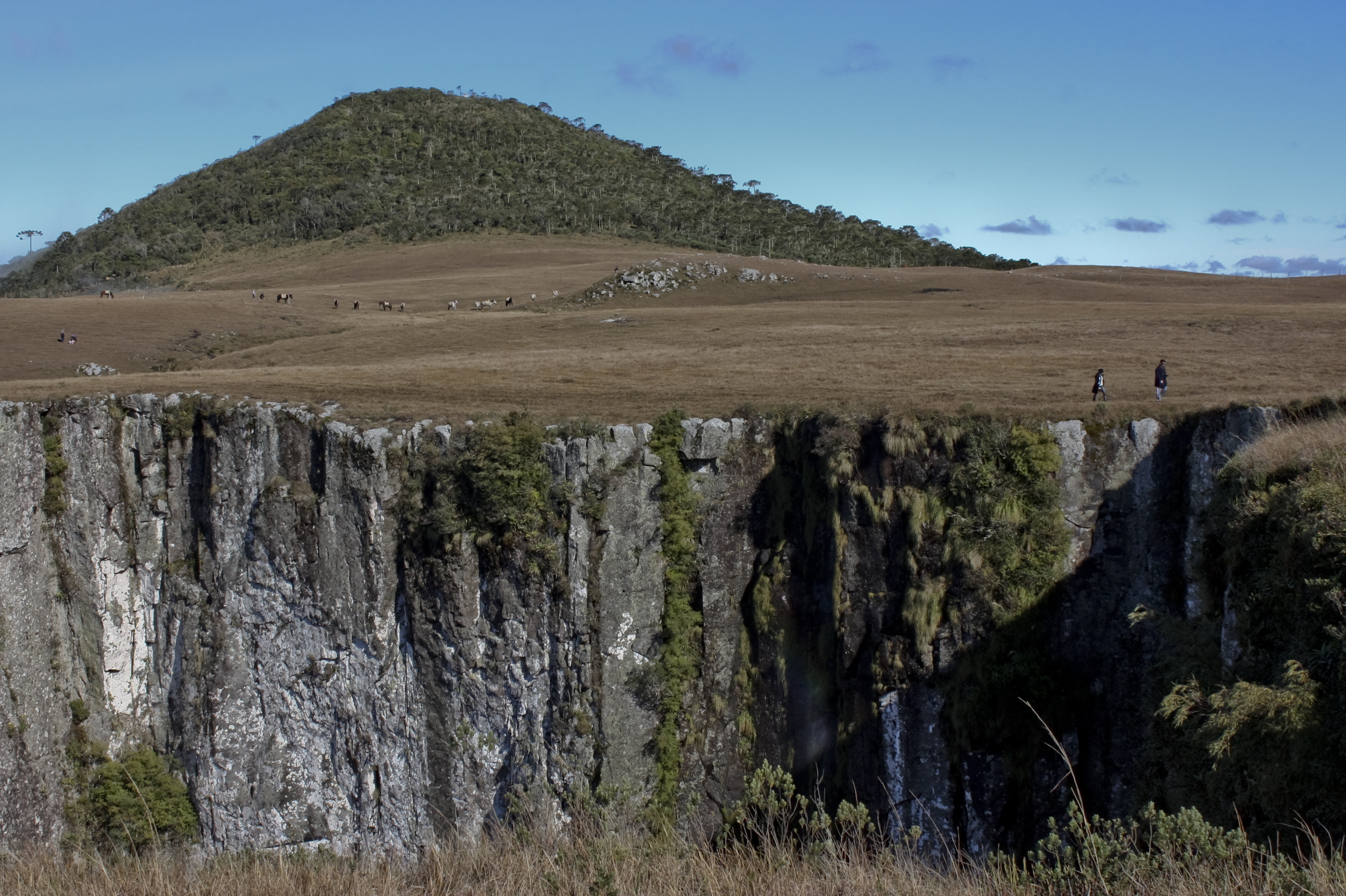

Highest point
- Elevation: 1,398 m (4,587 ft)
- Listing: Brazilian state high point
- Coordinates: 28°37′S 49°48′W

Naming
- English translation: Black Mountain Peak
- Language of name: Portuguese

Geography
- Location within Brazil
- Location: Rio Grande do Sul, Brazil

Pico do Monte Negro is the highest mountain in the Brazilian state of Rio Grande do Sul, at 1,398 metres (4,587 ft).

It is located in the canyon of same name, about 10 miles east of Silveira. The peak is considered easy to reach. By car, it is possible to reach the base of the mountain, with the rest of the way being travelled by foot.

All the mountain and its surroundings are covered by a dense Araucaria forest.
