= List of places in Brazil named after people =

This is a list of places in Brazil which are named after people:

== Acre ==
- Assis Brasil – Joaquim Francisco de Assis Brasil, one of the signatories of the Treaty of Petropolis and former Governor of Rio Grande do Sul
- Epitaciolândia – President Epitácio da Silva Pessoa
- Feijó – Diogo Feijó, Regent of Empire of Brazil
- Mâncio Lima – Colonel Mâncio Antonio Rodrigues Lima (1875–1950), founder, pioneer and mayor of Alto Juruá
- Manoel Urbano – Manuel Urbano da Encarnação (1805–1897), an Amazonian mestizo explorer
- Marechal Thaumaturgo – Gregório Taumaturgo de Azevedo (1853–1921), founder of Cruzeiro do Sul and former mayor of Alto Juruá
- Porto Walter – Walter do Carvalho, early resident of Acre
- Plácido de Castro – José Plácido de Castro, President of the extinct Republic of Acre
- Rio Branco – José Paranhos, Baron of Rio Branco, Minister of Foreign Affairs
- Rodrigues Alves – President Rodrigues Alves
- Santa Rosa do Purus – Saint Rose of Lima
- Sena Madureira – Lieutenant colonel Antônio de Sena Madureira, Paraguayan War hero
- Senador Guiomard – José Guiomard, state senator and Territorial Governor of Acre

== Alagoas ==
- Barra de Santo Antônio - Saint Anthony of Padua
- Barra de São Miguel - Saint Michael
- Colônia Leopoldina - Princess Leopoldina of Brazil
- Delmiro Gouveia - Delmiro Augusto da Cruz Gouveia
- Girau do Ponciano - Ponciano Ferreira de Souza, early settler
- Joaquim Gomes - Joaquim Gomes da Silva Rego (1870-1920), founder
- Major Isidoro - Isidoro Jerônimo da Rocha (1852-1936)
- Marechal Deodoro - President Manuel Deodoro da Fonseca
- Messias - Jesus "the Messiah"
- Paulo Jacinto - Paulo Jacinto Tenório (1839-1927), first and only Baron of Palmeiras dos Índios
- Santa Luzia do Norte - Lucy of Syracuse
- Santana do Ipanema - Saint Anne
- São Brás - Saint Blaise
- São José da Laje - Saint Joseph
- São Luís do Quitunde - Louis IX of France
- São Sebastião - Sebastião Muniz Falcão (1915-1966), governor of Alagoas
- Senador Rui Palmeira - Rui Soares Palmeira (1910-1968), state senator of Alagoas
- Teotônio Vilela - Teotônio Brandão Vilela (1917-1983), state senator of Alagoas

== Amapá ==
- Ferreira Gomes - João Ferreira Gomes (founder)
- Santana - Saint Anne

== Amazonas ==
- Benjamin Constant - Benjamin Constant, founder of the Republic
- Lábrea - Colonel Antônio Rodrigues Pereira Labre (1827-1899), founder
- Presidente Figueiredo - João Batista de Figueiredo Tenreiro Aranha (1798-1861), President of the Province of Amazonas
- Santa Isabel do Rio Negro - Saint Elizabeth
- Santo Antônio do Içá - Saint Anthony of Padua
- São Gabriel da Cachoeira - Gabriel de Sousa Filgueiras, Governor of the Captaincy of São José do Rio Negro from 1760 to 1761
- São Paulo de Olivença - Saint Paul
- São Sebastião do Uatumã - Saint Sebastian

== Bahia ==
- Amélia Rodrigues - Amélia Augusta do Sacramento Rodrigues (1861-1926), poet, writer and educator
- Antônio Cardoso - Colonel Antônio Cardoso de Sousa (1848–1932)
- Aurelino Leal - Dr. Aurelino de Araújo Leal (1877-1924), lawyer and journalist
- Cândido Sales - Cândido Sales (1861-1956), a former landowner in the region
- Cardeal da Silva - Augusto da Silva, Archbishop of São Salvador da Bahia
- Castro Alves - Castro Alves, poet and playwright
- Cícero Dantas - Cícero Dantas Martins (1833-1903), politician and businessman
- Coronel João Sá - Colonel João Gonçalves de Sá (1882-1958), state deputy
- Dom Basílio - Basílio Manoel Olímpio Pereira (1871-1948), Bishop emeritus of Manaus
- Dom Macedo Costa - Antônio de Macedo Costa
- Elísio Medrado - Dr. Elísio de Moura Medrado (1887-1951)
- Érico Cardoso - Érico Cayres Cardoso (1918–1984), first mayor of the town
- Euclides da Cunha - Euclides da Cunha (Brazilian writer)
- Eunápolis - Eunápio de Queirós (1905-1998), federal deputy for Bahia
- Governador Mangabeira - Otávio Mangabeira, Governor of Bahia
- João Dourado - Colonel João da Silva Dourado (1854–1927)
- Jussara - President Juscelino Kubitschek and his wife Sarah Kubitschek
- Lafaiete Coutinho - Lafaiete Coutinho de Alburquerque (1906-1959), federal deputy
- Lauro de Freitas - Lauro Farani Pedreira de Freitas (1901–1950)
- Licínio de Almeida - Licínio de Almeida (1888-1944), an engineer for the Federal Railway Network Company
- Luís Eduardo Magalhães - Luís Eduardo Magalhães (1955-1998), President of the Chamber of Deputies
- Manoel Vitorino - Manuel Vitorino, Governor of Bahia and Vice President of Brazil under Prudente de Morais
- Marcionílio Souza - Colonel Marcionílio Antônio de Souza (1859–1943)
- Medeiros Neto - Antônio Garcia de Medeiros Neto (1887-1948)
- Miguel Calmon - Miguel Calmon du Pin and Almeida Sobrinho (1912-1967), third rector of the Federal University of Bahia
- Muniz Ferreira - Dr. Manoel Muniz Ferreira (d.1962), respected physician
- Nilo Peçanha - President Nilo Peçanha
- Paulo Afonso - Paulo Viveiros Afonso, sertanista
- Pedro Alexandre - Pedro Alexandre de Carvalho (1865-1925)
- Presidente Dutra - President Eurico Gaspar Dutra
- Presidente Jânio Quadros - President Jânio Quadros
- Presidente Tancredo Neves - President Tancredo Neves
- Rafael Jambeiro - Dr. Rafael Jambeiro (1886-1926), mayor of Castro Alves
- Ruy Barbosa - Ruy Barbosa (Brazilian jurist, politician and diplomat)
- Salvador, Brazil - Jesus (the Christian Savior)
- Sátiro Dias - Sátiro de Oliveira Dias (1843-1913)
- Sebastião Laranjeiras - Sebastião Dias Laranjeira (1820-1888), 2nd Bishop of São Pedro do Rio Grande do Sul
- Simões Filho - Ernesto Simões Filho (1886-1957), Minister of Education and founder of the newspaper "A Tarde"
- Souto Soares - João Souto Soares (1912-1952)
- Teixeira de Freitas - Mário Augusto Teixeira de Freitas (1890-1956)
- Teodoro Sampaio - Teodoro Fernandes Sampaio
- Teofilândia - Joaquim Teófilo de Oliveira, local accountant
- Wagner - Franz Wagner, German Protestant mineralogist and merchant
- Wanderley - João Maurício Vanderlei, Baron of Cotegipe
- Wenceslau Guimarães - Wenceslau de Oliveira Guimarães (1861-1932), lawyer

== Ceará ==
- Antonina do Norte - Antonina Aderaldo de Aquino (1885-1946), state governor’s mother
- Campos Sales - President Manuel Ferraz de Campos Sales
- Capistrano - Capistrano de Abreu (1853-1927), historian
- Deputado Irapuan Pinheiro - Irapuan Pinheiro (1934-1982), state deputy
- Eusébio - Eusébio de Queirós
- Farias Brito - Raimundo de Farías Brito (1862-1917), philosopher
- General Sampaio - Antônio de Sampaio
- Martinópole - Father Vicente Martins (1856-1933)
- Monsenhor Tabosa - Antônio Tabosa Braga (1874-1935)
- Penaforte - Raimundo Ulisses de Albuquerque Penaforte (1855-1921), poet, writer and priest
- Piquet Carneiro - Bernardo Piquet Carneiro (1860-1936)
- Santa Quitéria - Saint Quiteria, virgin and martyr
- Santana do Acaraú and Santana do Cariri - Saint Anne
- São Benedito - Saint Benedict the Moor
- São Gonçalo do Amarante - Saint Gundisalvus of Amarante
- São João do Jaguaribe - Saint John the Baptist
- São Luís do Curu - Saint Louis IX of France
- Senador Pompeu - Tomás Pompeu de Sousa Brasil (1818-1877)
- Senador Sá - Francisco Sá, state senator
- Solonópole - Manoel Solon Rodrigues Pinheiro (1864-1917)

== Espírito Santo ==
- Anchieta - Father José de Anchieta
- Afonso Cláudio - Afonso Cláudio (politician)
- Alfredo Chaves - Alfredo Rodrigues Fernandes Chaves (1844-1894)
- Domingos Martins - Domingos José Martins, Pernambucan revolutionary
- Governador Lindenberg - Carlos Lindenberg (1899-1991), Governor of Espirito Santo
- Jerônimo Monteiro - Jerônimo de Sousa Monteiro
- João Neiva - João Soares Neiva (1839-1903)
- Linhares - Rodrigo de Souza Coutinho, Count of Linhares
- Marechal Floriano, Espírito Santo - Floriano Peixoto (a president of Brazil)
- Muniz Freire - José de Melo Carvalho Muniz Freire
- Pedro Canário - Pedro Canário Ribeiro (1901-1980)
- Presidente Kennedy, Espírito Santo, Brazil - John Fitzgerald Kennedy (American president)
- Santa Leopoldina - Maria Leopoldina, Archduchess of Austria
- Santa Teresa - Teresa of Ávila
- São Gabriel da Palha - Saint Gabriel
- São José do Calçado - Saint Joseph
- São Mateus - Saint Matthew
- São Roque do Canaã - Saint Roch

== Goiás ==
- Alexânia - Alex Abdallah (1930-2021), founder
- Amorinópolis and Israelândia - Israel de Amorim (1905-1994), state deputy
- Americano do Brasil - Antônio Americano do Brasil (1892-1932), writer
- Brazabrantes - Brás Abrantes (1841-1923), State President of Goias
- Damianópolis - Damiana, one of the pioneers of the region
- Damolândia - Antônio Dâmaso da Silva, founder
- Firminópolis - Manuel Firmino dos Santos (1892–1976), foundar of a local estate
- Gouvelândia - João de Oliveira Gouveia, pioneer
- Inaciolândia - José Inácio Rodrigues de Barros, founder
- Jussara - Jussara Marqués (1931-2006), Miss Brazil 1949
- Leopoldo de Bulhões - Leopoldo de Bulhões (1856-1928), state senator of Goias
- Mossâmedes - José de Almeida e Vasconcelos, baron of Mossâmedes (1740–1812)
- Mozarlândia - Mozart Andrade Mota (d.1993)
- Nerópolis - Nero de Macedo Carvalho (1887-1961), state senator
- Padre Bernardo - father Bernardo Gomes Barbosa
- Pires do Rio - José Pires do Rio (1880-1950), Minister of Transportation and Public Works
- Professor Jamil - Jamil Salim Safady (1908-1985)
- Quirinópolis - José Quirino, one of the pioneers of the southwest region of Goiás
- Sanclerlândia - Saint'Clair Rodrigues de Mendonça (1910-1958), founder
- Santa Bárbara de Goiás - Saint Barbara
- Santa Helena de Goiás - Saint Helena of Constantinople
- Santa Isabel - Saint Elizabeth
- Santa Rita do Araguaia and Santa Rita do Novo Destino - Saint Rita
- Santa Rosa de Goiás - Rose of Lima
- Santa Tereza de Goiás - Saint Teresa of Avila
- Santa Terezinha de Goiás - Saint Therese of Lisieux
- Santo Antônio da Barra, Santo Antônio de Goiás and Santo Antônio do Descoberto - Saint Anthony
- São Domingos, Goiás - Saint Dominic
- São Francisco de Goiás - Saint Francis
- São João d'Aliança and São João da Paraúna - Saint John the Baptist
- São Luís de Montes Belos and São Luíz do Norte - Saint Louis IX of France
- São Miguel do Araguaia and São Miguel do Passa Quatro - Saint Michael
- São Patrício - Saint Patrick
- São Simão - Simon the Zealot
- Senador Canedo - Antônio Amaro da Silva Canedo (1849-1895), state senator of Goias
- Silvânia - The Silva Family
- Simolândia - Simão Soares, Mayor of Posse
- Vianópolis - Colonel Felismino de Souza Viana
- Vicentinópolis - Vicente Ferreira Meirelles, farmer
- Vila Propício - Joaquim Propício de Pina (1867-1943), teacher, musician, conductor and founder of the Phoenix Band

== Maranhão ==
- Benedito Leite - Benedito Pereira Leite (1857-1909)
- Cândido Mendes - Cândido Mendes de Almeida
- Coelho Neto - Coelho Neto
- Davinópolis - Davi Alves Silva (1951-1998), Mayor of Imperatriz
- Godofredo Viana - Godofredo Mendes Viana (1878-1944)
- Gonçalves Dias - Antônio Gonçalves Dias (a Brazilian poet)
- Governador Archer - Sebastião Archer (1883-1974), Governor of Maranhão
- Governador Eugênio Barros - Eugênio Barros (1898-1988), Governor of Maranhão
- Governador Luiz Rocha - Luís Rocha (politician), Governor of Maranhão
- Governador Edison Lobão - Edison Lobão, Governor of Maranhão
- Governador Newton Bello - Newton de Barros Bello (1907-1976), Governor of Maranhão
- Governador Nunes Freire - Osvaldo Nunes Freire (1911-1986), Governor of Maranhão
- Humberto de Campos - Humberto de Campos (journalist)
- Imperatriz - Teresa Cristina of the Two Sicilies
- Luís Domingues - Luís Domingues da Silva (1852-1922)
- Magalhães de Almeida - José Maria Magalhães de Almeida (1883-1945)
- Nina Rodrigues - Raimundo Nina Rodrigues
- Paulino Neves - Paulino Gomes Neves (1854-1941)
- Paulo Ramos - Paulo Martins de Sousa Ramos (1896-1969), Governor of Maranhão
- Pio XII - Pope Pius XII
- Presidente Dutra - Eurico Gaspar Dutra (a Brazilian president)
- Presidente Juscelino, Maranhão - Juscelino Kubitschek
- Presidente Médici - Emílio Garrastazu Médici
- Presidente Sarney - José Sarney
- Presidente Vargas - Getulio Vargas
- Ribamar Fiquene - José de Ribamar Fiquene (1930-2011), Governor of Maranhão
- São Luís, Maranhão, Brazil - Louis IX of France (Saint Louis)
- Senador Alexandre Costa - Alexandre Alves Costa (1918-1998), state senator
- Senador La Rocque - Henrique de La Rocque (1912-1982), state senator
- Tasso Fragoso - General Augusto Tasso Fragoso
- Urbano Santos - Urbano Santos da Costa Araújo
- Vitorino Freire - Vitorino de Brito Freire
- Zé Doca - José Mariano da Silva (Zé Doca), pioneer

== Mato Grosso ==
- Barão de Melgaço and Santo Antônio de Leverger - Augusto Leverger, Baron of Melgaço
- Cáceres - Luís de Albuquerque de Melo Pereira e Cáceres
- Campos de Júlio - Júlio José de Campos (b.1946), Governor of Mato Grosso
- Denise - Denise Costa Marques, daughter of Júlio Costa Marques Filho
- Dom Aquino - Francisco de Aquino Correia
- General Carneiro - Gomes Carneiro
- Juscimeira - Juscelino Kubitschek and José Cândido de Lima, early settler
- Lucas do Rio Verde - Francisco Lucas de Barros (1874-1945)
- Marcelândia - Marcelo Bianchini, son of the colonizer
- Nobres - the Nobres family
- Nossa Senhora do Livramento - Mary, mother of Jesus (Our Lady of Deliverance)
- Novo São Joaquim - Saint Joachim
- Peixoto de Azevedo - Antônio Peixoto de Azevedo
- Pontes e Lacerda - Antônio Pires da Silva Pontes Leme and Francisco José de Lacerda e Almeida, cartographers
- Porto Esperidião - Dr. Manoel Esperidião da Costa Marques (1859-1906)
- Rio Branco, Mato Grosso - José Paranhos, Baron of Rio Branco
- Rondonópolis and Rondolândia - Cândido Rondon (Brazilian military officer and explorer)
- Santa Carmem - Our Lady of Mount Carmel
- Santa Terezinha - Therese of Lisieux
- Santo Afonso - Alphonsus Liguori
- São Félix do Araguaia - Felix of Valois
- São José do Rio Claro - Saint Joseph

== Mato Grosso do Sul ==
- Alcinópolis - Alcino Fernandes Carneiro, founder
- Anastácio - Anastácio de Sousa Coutinho (1856-1925), early pioneer, rancher, and major political leader in the region
- Anaurilândia - Anaurelíssia Gonzáles, wife of a paraguayan farmer and settler of the region
- Antônio João - Antônio João Ribeiro, Paraguayan War hero who was killed in action on 1864
- Aral Moreira - Aral Moreira (1898-1952), state deputy
- Bataguassu and Batayporã - Jan Antonín Baťa
- Cassilândia - Joaquim Balduíno de Souza or Cassinha (1895-1946), founder
- Coronel Sapucaia - Colonel Orlando Olsen Sapucaía (1918-1963), military hero
- Costa Rica - José Ferreira da Costa, founder
- Deodápolis - Deodato Leonardo da Silva (d.2006), founder
- Guia Lopes da Laguna - José Francisco Lopes (1811-1868), Paraguayan War hero
- Ladário - José da Costa Azevedo, Baron of Ladário (1825-1904)
- Miranda - Caetano Pinto de Miranda Montenegro (1748-1827), Captain General of Pernambuco
- Nova Andradina - Antônio Joaquim de Moura Andrade (1889-1962), cattler and founder
- Paranhos - José Paranhos, Baron of Rio Branco
- Porto Murtinho - Joaquim Murtinho, state senator
- Santa Rita do Pardo - Saint Rita of Cascia
- São Gabriel do Oeste - Saint Gabriel
- Sidrolândia - Sidrônio Antunes de Andrade (1890–1977), founder
- Vicentina - Saint Vincent Pallotti

== Minas Gerais ==
- Alfredo Vasconcelos - Alfredo de Vasconcelos, local engineer
- Alvinópolis - Cesário Alvim, Governor of Minas Gerais
- Andrelândia - André da Silveira, farmer
- Antônio Carlos - Antônio Carlos Ribeiro de Andrada IV (1870-1946), mayor of Belo Horizonte
- Antônio Prado de Minas - Dr. Antônio da Silva Prado (1840-1929), Counselor of the Empire
- Astolfo Dutra - Astolfo Dutra Nicácio (1864-1920), President of the Chamber of Deputies
- Belmiro Braga - Belmiro Ferreira Braga (1872-1937), poet
- Brás Pires - Brás Pires Farinho, early pioneer
- Bueno Brandão and Buenópolis - Júlio Bueno Brandão (1858-1931), Governor of Minas Gerais
- Caetanópolis - Col. Caetano Mascarenhas, one of the founders of the fabric factory
- Capitão Andrade - Captain Manoel Vieira de Andrade, mayor of the town
- Capitão Enéas - Enéas Mineiro de Souza (1889-1965), founder
- Carlos Chagas, Minas Gerais - Dr. Carlos Chagas, scientist
- Carvalhópolis - the Carvalho family
- Cônego Marinho - Father José Antônio Marinho (1803-1853)
- Conselheiro Lafaiete - Lafayette Rodrigues Pereira
- Coronel Fabriciano - Lieutenant colonel Fabriciano Felisberto Carvalho de Brito (1840-1921)
- Coronel Murta - Inácio Carlos Moreira Murta, founder
- Coronel Pacheco - José Manoel Pacheco (1838-1914)
- Cristiano Otoni - Cristiano Benedito Ottoni (1811-1896)
- Cristina - Teresa Cristina of the Two Sicilies
- Delfim Moreira and Delfinópolis - President Delfim Moreira
- Diogo de Vasconcelos - Diogo de Vasconcelos (1843-1927), historian
- Dom Bosco - John Bosco
- Dom Cavati - Dom João Batista Cavatti
- Dom Joaquim - Joaquim Silvério de Sousa (1859–1933), Archbishop of Diamantina
- Dom Silvério - Silvério Gomes Pimenta (1840–1922), Archbishop of Mariana
- Dom Viçoso - Antônio Ferreira Viçoso
- Dona Eusébia - Eusébia de Sousa Lima, local farmer
- Elói Mendes - Joaquim Elói Mendes, Baron of Varginha
- Engenheiro Caldas – Engineer Felipe Moreira Caldas, responsible for the construction of the old Rio-Bahía
- Engenheiro Navarro – Engineer João do Nascimento Navarro, resident engineer for the Central Brazil Railway Company
- Eugenópolis - Colonel Luís Eugênio Monteiro de Barros
- Ewbank da Câmara - José Felipe Neri Ewbank da Câmara (1843–1890)
- Faria Lemos - Francisco de Faria Lemos (1828–1904), Governor of Minas Gerais
- Felício dos Santos - Joaquim Felício dos Santos (1828–1895), federal senator
- Felixlândia - Father Felix Ferreira da Rocha
- Fernandes Tourinho - Sebastião Fernandes Tourinho, bandeirante
- Francisco Badaró - Dr. Francisco Duarte Coelho Badaró, former plenipotentiary minister
- Francisco Dumont - Francisco Dumont, resident of the old village
- Francisco Sá - Engineer Francisco Sá (1862–1936)
- Frei Gaspar - Frei Gaspar de Módica
- Governador Valadares - Benedito Valadares (1892-1973), Governor of Minas Gerais
- João Monlevade - Jean-Antoine Felix Dissandes de Monlevade (1791–1872), French geologist
- João Pinheiro - João Pinheiro, Governor of Minas Gerais
- Joaquim Felício - Joaquim Felício dos Santos
- José Raydan - José Raydan, farmer
- Leopoldina - Princess Leopoldina of Brazil
- Lima Duarte - Conselheiro José Rodrigues de Lima Duarte
- Martinho Campos - Martinho Álvares da Silva Campos
- Mateus Leme - Mateus Leme, São Paulo pioneer
- Matias Cardoso - Matias Cardoso de Almeida, pioneer
- Mendes Pimentel - Francisco Mendes Pimentel (1869-1957)
- Monsenhor Paulo - Paulo Emílio Moinhos de Vilhena
- Montezuma - Francisco Jê Acaiaba de Montezuma, Viscount of Jequitinhonha
- Nacip Raydan - Nacip Raydan Coutinho (d.1962), state deputy
- Olímpio Noronha - Ensign Olympio Luiz Gonçalves de Noronha (1850–1926), son of the volunteer for the Paraguayan War
- Paula Cândido - Dr. Francisco Gomes de Paula Cândido
- Pedrinópolis - Colonel Pedro Rodrigues
- Presidente Bernardes - President Artur Bernardes
- Presidente Juscelino and Presidente Kubitschek - President Juscelino Kubitschek
- Presidente Olegário - Olegário Maciel (1855-1933), President of Minas Gerais
- Prudente de Morais - President Prudente José de Morais Barros
- Raul Soares - Raul Soares de Moura (1877–1924)
- Resende Costa - José de Resende Costa (son), insurrectionist
- Santos Dumont - Alberto Santos Dumont, inventor of aircraft
- São João del Rei - King John V of Portugal (1689-1750)
- Senador Amaral - Eduardo Amaral (1857-1938), state senator
- Senador Cortes - Senator of the Brazilian Empire, Agostinho Cezario de Figueiredo Cortes
- Senador Firmino - Senator of the Brazilian Empire, Firmino Rodrigues da Silva
- Senador José Bento - Father José Bento Leite Ferreira de Melo (1785-1844), state senator
- Senador Modestino Gonçalves - Modestino Carlos Gonçalves Moreira (1861-1941), state senator
- Simão Pereira - Simão Pereira de Sá, first cultivator
- Teófilo Otoni - Teófilo Benedito Ottoni
- Tiradentes - Tiradentes, national hero
- Visconde do Rio Branco - José Paranhos, Viscount of Rio Branco
- Wenceslau Braz - Venceslau Brás

== Pará ==
- Abel Figueiredo - Abel Nunes de Figueiredo (1896-1972), state deputy
- Augusto Corrêa - Augusto Corrêa (d.1955), mayor of Bragança
- Bannach - the Bannach Family
- Capitão Poço - Captain Possolo, a member of the first caravan of pioneer explorers
- Curionópolis - Sebastião Curió (1934-2022), federal deputy of Pará
- Dom Eliseu - Eliseu Maria Coroli (1900-1982)
- Magalhães Barata – Magalhães Barata (1888–1959)
- Medicilândia - President Emílio Garrastazu Médici
- Rondon do Pará - Cândido Rondon
- Santa Bárbara do Pará - Saint Barbara
- Santa Isabel do Pará - Saint Elizabeth
- Santa Luzia do Pará - Saint Lucy
- Santa Maria das Barreiras and Santa Maria do Pará - Mary, mother of Jesus
- Santana do Araguaia - Saint Anne
- Santo Antônio do Tauá - Saint Anthony of Padua
- São Caetano de Odivelas - Saint Cajetan
- São Domingos do Araguaia and São Domingos do Capim - Saint Dominic
- São Félix do Xingu - Felix of Valois
- São Francisco do Pará - Francis of Assisi
- São Geraldo do Araguaia - named after a son of the owner of the land in the region
- São João da Ponta, São João de Pirabas and São João do Araguaia - John the Baptist
- São Miguel do Guamá - Bishop Miguel de Bulhões
- São Sebastião da Boa Vista - Saint Sebastian
- Senador José Porfírio - José Porfírio de Miranda Júnior (1863-1934), state senator
- Ulianópolis - the Uliana Family

== Paraíba ==
- Bernardino Batista - Bernardino José Batista, first councilor of São João do Rio do Peixe
- João Pessoa, Paraíba - João Pessoa Cavalcanti de Albuquerque, governor of the state of Paraíba
- Joca Claudino - João Claudino Sobrinho (1899-1997), local businessman
- Juarez Távora - Juarez Távora (general)
- Marizópolis - Antônio Mariz (1937-1995), Governor of Paraiba
- Pedro Régis - Pedro Régis da Silva, pioneer
- Pombal - Sebastião José de Carvalho e Melo, 1st Marquis of Pombal
- Princesa Isabel - Isabel, Princess Imperial of Brazil
- Vieirópolis - the Vieira Family

== Paraná ==
- Adrianópolis - Adriano Seabra da Fonseca, first miner of the region
- Almirante Tamandaré - Joaquim Marques Lisboa, Marquis of Tamandaré
- Altônia - Alberto Byington, partner in the colonization company
- Anahy - Anahy Cantizzani, daughter of the Brazilian Company of Immigration and Colonization's manager
- Antonina, Paraná - António, Prior of Crato
- Antônio Olinto - Antônio Olinto dos Santos Pires
- Assis Chateaubriand - Assis Chateaubriand
- Barbosa Ferraz - Salomão Barbosa Ferraz
- Bom Jesus do Sul - Jesus
- Borrazópolis - Dr. Francisco José Borraz (1900-1981), director of Banco do Rio Grande do Sul S/A
- Braganey - Ney Braga de Barros (1917-2000), Governor of Paraná
- Campina do Simão - José Simão, early resident
- Campo Mourão - Luís António de Sousa Botelho Mourão, Governor of the captaincy of São Paulo
- Cândido de Abreu - Cândido Ferreira de Abreu (1856-1918), Mayor of Curitiba
- Capanema, Paraná - Guilherme Schüch, baron of Capanema (1824-1908)
- Capitão Leônidas Marques - Captain Leônidas Marques dos Santos (d.1924), military of the 1924 Revolution
- Carlópolis - Carlos Cavalcanti de Albuquerque (1864-1935), Governor of Paraná
- Castro - Martinho de Melo e Castro (1716–1795)
- Clevelândia - Grover Cleveland
- Colombo, Paraná - Christopher Colombus
- Conselheiro Mairinck - Francisco de Paula Mayrink (1839-1906)
- Cornélio Procópio - Colonel Cornélio Procópio de Araújo Carvalho (1857-1909)
- Coronel Domingos Soares - Domingos Soares (1852-1928), State Deputy for Paraná
- Coronel Vivida - Firmino Teixeira Baptista "Colonel Vivida" (1834-1903), head of the Federalist Revolution
- Cruz Machado - Antônio Cândido da Cruz Machado (1820-1905)
- Doutor Camargo - Dr. Antônio Cândido Camargo (1864–1947)
- Doutor Ulysses - Ulysses Guimarães
- Engenheiro Beltrão - Alexandre Gutierrez Beltrão (1896–1987), director of the colonizing company
- Fernandes Pinheiro - Antonio Augusto Fernandes Pinheiro, director of the São Paulo – Rio Grande do Sul railway company
- Francisco Alves - Brazilian singer Francisco Alves (1898-1952)
- Francisco Beltrão - Francisco Trevisani Beltrão (1903–1957), engineer and director of the Western Department in Paraná
- General Carneiro - General Antônio Ernesto Gomes Carneiro (d.1894), hero of the federalist revolution
- Godoy Moreira - Francisco Elias de Godoy Moreira (1899-1987), pioneer
- Honório Serpa - Honório Serpa, son of the landowners of the region
- Inácio Martins - Inácio Martins, engineer who coordinated the construction of the railway in the region
- Janiópolis - President Jânio Quadros
- Joaquim Távora - Lieutenant Joaquim Távora, one of the leaders of the 1924 Revolution
- Jussara, Paraná - Jussara Marques (1931-2006), Miss Brazil
- Lidianópolis - Lydia do Paraiso (1890-1951), mother of a founder
- Lunardelli - Geremias Lunardelli (1885-1962), Italian-Brazilian landowner
- Lupionópolis - Moisés Lupion, Governor of Paraná
- Mallet - Marshal Émile Mallet, Baron of Itapevi
- Manfrinópolis - Moisés Manfrin (1930-2009), lumberjack of the region
- Manoel Ribas - Manuel Ribas (1873–1946), 28th Federal Interventor of Paraná
- Marechal Cândido Rondon and Rondon, Paraná - Cândido Rondon
- Maria Helena - Maria Helena de Abreu, daughter of an early settler
- Marilena - Maria Helena Volpato, wife of a general manager of the land development companies
- Mariópolis - Mário José Fontana, director of Clevelândia Industrial e Territorial Ltda
- Mauá da Serra - Irineu Evangelista de Sousa, Viscount of Mauá
- Moreira Sales - João Moreira Salles, the owner of the land
- Munhoz de Melo - José Munhoz de Mello (1912-1994), President of the Court of Justice of the State of Paraná
- Paula Freitas - Antonio de Paula Freitas (1843-1906), railway engineer for São Paulo-Rio Grande Railway Company
- Paulo Frontin - Paulo de Frontin (1860-1933)
- Pérola - Pérola Byington
- Pranchita - Planchita Ferrera, daughter of a Paraguayan citizen
- Presidente Castelo Branco - President Humberto de Alencar Castelo Branco
- Prudentópolis - President Prudente de Morais
- Rolândia - Roland, German medieval hero
- Salgado Filho - Joaquim Pedro Salgado Filho
- Siqueira Campos - Antônio de Siqueira Campos
- Teixeira Soares - João Teixeira Soares (1848-1927)
- Telêmaco Borba - Colonel Telêmaco Augusto Enéas Morosini Borba (1840-1918), writer
- Wenceslau Braz - President Venceslau Brás

== Pernambuco ==
- Abreu e Lima - General José Inácio de Abreu e Lima
- Afrânio - Afrânio de Melo Franco (1870-1943), Minister of Transportation and Public Works
- Fernando de Noronha - Fernão de Loronha
- Frei Miguelinho - Miguel Joaquim de Almeida e Castro, hero of the Pernambucan revolt
- João Alfredo - João Alfredo Correia de Oliveira
- Joaquim Nabuco - Joaquim Nabuco
- Moreno - Antônio de Souza Leão (1808-1882), first and only Baron of Morenos
- Petrolândia - Pedro II of Brazil
- Petrolina - Pedro I of Brazil and his consort Maria Leopoldina of Austria
- Terezinha - Thérèse of Lisieux
- Vicência - Vicência Barbosa de Melo, former owner of the city

== Piauí ==
- Anísio de Abreu - Anísio Auto de Abreu (1864-1909), Governor of Piaui
- Avelino Lopes - Avelino Lopes do Couto, one of the original settlers
- Capitão Gervásio Oliveira - Captain Gervásio Oliveira, military and comunitarian leader
- Coronel José Dias - Dr. José Dias de Souza (1878-1962), Lieutenant Colonel in the Brazilian National Guard, state deputy and local mayor
- Demerval Lobão - Demerval Lobão Veras (1915-1958), lawyer, educator and federal deputy
- Dirceu Arcoverde - Dirceu Mendes Arcoverde (1925-1979), Governor of Piaui
- Dom Expedito Lopes - Francisco Expedito Lopes, Brazilian Catholic bishop
- Dom Inocêncio - Inocêncio López Santamaría (1874-1958), Spanish-born Catholic bishop and missionary
- Eliseu Martins - Eliseu de Sousa Martins (1842-1894), state senator
- Francisco Macedo - Dr. Francisco Macedo (1949-1989), Mayor of Padre Marcos
- Francisco Santos - Colonel Francisco de Souza Santos (1884-1951)
- Hugo Napoleão - Hugo Napoleão do Rego (1892-1965), federal deputy from Piaui
- Isaías Coelho - Dr. Isaías Rodrigues Coelho (d.1960), physician
- Landri Sales - Landry Sales Gonçalves (1904-1978), Governor of Piaui
- Luís Correia - Luiz Moraes Correia (1881-1934), writer
- Marcos Parente - Marcos Santos Parente (1922-1958), mathematician
- Matias Olímpio - Matías Olímpio de Melo (1887-1967), Governor of Piaui
- Monsenhor Gil - Monsignor Raimundo Gil da Silva Brito (1855-1919), local priest and landowner
- Monsenhor Hipólito - Monsignor João Hipólito de Sousa Ferreira (1880-1943), catholic priest
- Padre Marcos - Marcos de Araújo Costa (1778-1850), Roman Catholic priest, educator, and prominent regional leader
- Paes Landim - Captain Francisco Antônio Paes Landim Neto (d.1961), state deputy
- Pedro II - Pedro II of Brazil
- Pio IX - Pope Pius IX
- Sebastião Leal - Sebastião Rocha Leal (1925-1993), state deputy
- Sigefredo Pacheco - Sigefredo Pacheco (1904-1980), federal deputy
- Simplício Mendes - Dr. Simplício de Sousa Mendes (1823-1892), president of the Province of Piaui
- Teresina - Empress Tereza Christina of Brazil, wife of Pedro II
- Wall Ferraz - Raimundo Wall Ferraz (1932-1995), Mayor of Teresina

== Rio de Janeiro ==
- Belford Roxo - Engineer Belfort Roxo
- Bom Jesus do Itabapoana - Jesus
- Cardoso Moreira - Commander José Cardoso Moreira (1815-1889), businessman
- Carmo - Our Lady of Mount Carmel
- Casimiro de Abreu - Casimiro de Abreu, poet
- Comendador Levy Gasparian - commander Levy Gasparian (1906-1972), industrialist and entrepreneur
- Conceição de Macabu - Immaculate Conception of Mary
- Duque de Caxias - Luís Alves de Lima e Silva, Duke of Caxias, Brazilian general and politician
- Engenheiro Paulo de Frontin - Engineer Paulo de Frontin (1860-1933)
- Miguel Pereira - Dr. Miguel Pereira (1871-1918)
- Nilópolis, Brazil - President Nilo Peçanha
- Petrópolis, Brazil - Pedro II, emperor of Brazil
- Resende - General José Luís de Castro, 2nd Count of Resende
- Santa Maria Madalena - Saint Mary Magdalene
- São Fidélis - Saint Fidelis of Sigmaringen
- São Francisco de Itabapoana - Saint Francis of Paola
- São Gonçalo - Saint Gundisalvus of Amarante
- São João da Barra and São João de Meriti - Saint John the Baptist
- São José de Ubá and São José do Vale do Rio Preto - Saint Joseph
- São Pedro da Aldeia - Saint Peter
- São Sebastião do Alto - Saint Sebastian
- Silva Jardim - Antônio da Silva Jardim, republican activist
- Teresópolis - Empress Tereza Christina of Brazil, wife of Pedro II
- Trajano de Moraes - Dr. Trajano Antônio de Moraes (d.1911)

== Rio Grande do Norte ==
- Afonso Bezerra - Afonso de Ligório Bezerra (1907–1930), writer
- Alexandria, Rio Grande do Norte - Alexandrina Barreto Ferreira Chaves (1875-1921), wife of Joaquim Ferreira Chaves
- Almino Afonso - Almino Álvares Afonso (1840-1899), state senator
- Antônio Martins - Dr. Antônio Martins Fernandes de Carvalho (1905-1957)
- Bento Fernandes - Bento Fernandes de Macedo (d.1925), farmer
- Coronel Ezequiel - Colonel Ezequiel Mergelino de Sousa (1866-1953), state deputy
- Coronel João Pessoa - João Pessoa de Albuquerque (1854-1928), state deputy
- Doutor Severiano - Dr. Francisco Severiano de Figueiredo Sobrinho (1884-1949), municipal judge of São Miguel and state deputy
- Felipe Guerra - Felipe Neri de Brito Guerra (1867-1951)
- Fernando Pedroza - Fernando Pedroza, great owner of the locality
- Francisco Dantas - Francisco Dantas de Araújo (d.1942), first mayor of the town
- Frutuoso Gomes - Frutuoso Gomes, a farmer in the region
- Governador Dix-Sept Rosado - Jerônimo Dix-Sept Rosado, Governor of Rio Grande do Norte
- Ielmo Marinho - Ielmo Marinho de Queiroz (1933-1958), communitarian leader
- João Câmara - João Severiano da Câmara (1895-1948), state deputy and senator
- José da Penha - José da Penha Alves de Souza (1875-1914), army captain of the region
- Luís Gomes - Lieutenant Colonel Luís Gomes de Medeiros
- Major Sales - Francisco Evaristo de Queiroz Sales
- Marcelino Vieira - Marcelino Vieira da Costa, a farmer and breeder from Paraíba
- Messias Targino - Messias Targino da Cruz (1898-1972), an old member of an important family in the region
- Nísia Floresta - Nísia Floresta, writer
- Pedro Avelino - Pedro Celestino Costa Avelino (d.1923), journalist of the Municipality of Angicos
- Pedro Velho - Pedro de Albuquerque Maranhão (1856-1907), first governor of Rio Grande do Norte
- Rafael Fernandes - Dr. Rafael Fernandes Gurjão (1891-1952), Interventor Federal do Rio Grande do Norte
- Rodolfo Fernandes - Rodolfo Fernandes de Oliveira Martins (1875-1927), Mayor of Mossoró
- Ruy Barbosa - Ruy Barbosa (Brazilian jurist, politician and diplomat)
- Senador Elói de Souza - Elói de Sousa (1874-1959), senator of the republic
- Senador Georgino Avelino - José Georgino Alves e Sousa Avelino (1886-1959), state senator
- Severiano Melo - Severiano Régis de Melo (1871-1946), founder
- Tenente Ananias - Ananias Gomes da Silveira (1863-1950), lieutenant in the armed forces of Brazil
- Tenente Laurentino Cruz - Lieutenant Laurentino Theodoro da Cruz (1869–1951)

== Rio Grande do Sul ==
- Alegrete - Luís Teles da Silva Caminha e Meneses, 5th Marquis of Alegrete (1775-1828)
- Almirante Tamandaré do Sul - Joaquim Marques Lisboa, Marquis of Tamandaré
- Amaral Ferrador - General José Amaral Ferrador
- André da Rocha - Desembargador Manuel André da Rocha (1860-1942)
- Antônio Prado - Antônio da Silva Prado (1840 –1929), Minister of Agriculture
- Augusto Pestana - Augusto Pestana (politician), engineer and politician
- Barão de Cotegipe - João Maurício Vanderlei, Baron of Cotegipe
- Barão do Triunfo - Joaquim de Andrade Neves, Baron of Triunfo
- Barros Cassal - João de Barros Cassal (1858-1903), Governor of Rio Grande do Sul
- Benjamin Constant do Sul and Constantina - Benjamin Constant (military)
- Bento Gonçalves, Rio Grande do Sul - Bento Gonçalves da Silva, hero of the Farroupilha Revolution
- Cacique Doble - Cacique Faustino Ferreira Doble (1798-1864)
- Cândido Godói - Dr. José Cândido Godói (1858-1945)
- Carlos Barbosa - Carlos Barbosa Gonçalves (1851-1933), Governor of Rio Grande do Sul
- Carlos Gomes - Antônio Carlos Gomes, composer
- Coronel Barros - President Prudente de Morais
- David Canabarro - David Canabarro (1796–1867), leader of the Farroupilha Revolution
- Dom Feliciano - Feliciano José Rodrigues de Araújo Prates (1781-1858), Bishop of São Pedro do Rio Grande do Sul
- Dom Pedrito - Pedro Ansuateguy
- Dom Pedro de Alcântara - Pedro I of Brazil
- Dona Francisca - Princess Francisca of Brazil
- Doutor Maurício Cardoso - Dr. Mauricio Cardoso (1888-1938), Governor of Rio Grande do Sul who died in plane crash on 1938
- Doutor Ricardo - Dr. Ernesto Ricardo Heiseimann
- Fagundes Varela - Fagundes Varela, poet
- Flores da Cunha - José Antônio Flores da Cunha (1880-1959), Governor of Rio Grande do Sul
- Floriano Peixoto - President Floriano Peixoto
- Fontoura Xavier - Antônio Vicente da Fontoura Xavier (1856–1922), poet
- Frederico Westphalen - Frederico Westphalen (1876–1942), head of the Palmeira Land Commission
- Garibaldi - Giuseppe Garibaldi and Anita Garibaldi
- General Câmara - General José Antônio Corrêa Câmara
- Getúlio Vargas - President Getúlio Vargas, who was a native from Rio Grande do Sul
- Gramado dos Loureiros - João Pedro Loureiro de Mello, Paraguayan war veteran
- Júlio de Castilhos - Júlio de Castilhos, President of Rio Grande do Sul
- Liberato Salzano - Liberato Salzano Vieira da Cunha (1920–1957), Secretary of Education of Rio Grande do Sul
- Lindolfo Collor - Lindolfo Collor
- Manoel Viana - Colonel Manoel Viana
- Mariana Pimentel - named after Galdino Pimentel´s wife
- Maximiliano de Almeida - Colonel Maximiliano de Almeida
- Nicolau Vergueiro - Nicolau Pereira de Campos Vergueiro
- Osório - Manuel Luís Osório, Marquis of Erval
- Paim Filho - Firmino Paim Filho (1884-1971), state deputy and federal senator
- Parobé - Engineer João José Pereira Parobé (1853-1915)
- Pedro Osório - Colonel Pedro Osório (1854-1931), Mayor of Pelotas
- Pinheiro Machado - Pinheiro Machado (politician)
- Pinto Bandeira - General Rafael Pinto Bandeira (1740–1795)
- Porto Lucena and Presidente Lucena - Henrique Pereira de Lucena (1835-1913), President of the Province of Rio Grande do Sul
- Porto Mauá - Irineu Evangelista de Sousa, Viscount of Mauá
- Protásio Alves - General Protásio Alves
- Roque Gonzales - Saint Roque González y de Santa Cruz
- Saldanha Marinho - Joaquim Saldanha Marinho (1816–1895), lawyer
- São Gabriel - Gabriel de Avilez y del Fierro, viceroy of Spain on the Río de la Plata
- São José do Norte - Joseph I of Portugal
- São Leopoldo - Maria Leopoldina of Austria
- São Nicolau - Father Nicolau Mastrilli Duran (1570-1653), jesuit religious
- Senador Salgado Filho - Joaquim Pedro Salgado Filho
- Serafina Corrêa - Serafina Corrêa (1880-1945), wife of first Intendant of Guaporé
- Severiano de Almeida - Severiano de Souza e Almeida (1854-1927), Head of the Land and Colonization Commission of Jaguary
- Silveira Martins - Gaspar da Silveira Martins
- Sinimbu - João Lins Cansanção, Viscount of Sinimbu
- Tenente Portela - Engineering Lieutenant Mário Portela Fagundes (1898-1925), a member of the Prestes Column
- Tio Hugo - Hugo André Londero (1914-1993), owner of the gas station
- Tiradentes do Sul - Tiradentes
- Tucunduva - José Rodrigues Tucunduva Filho (1890-1933)
- Venâncio Aires - Venâncio de Oliveira Aires (1841-1885), journalist
- Vespasiano Correa - Vespasiano Correa (1871-1909), first Intendant of Guaporé
- Vicente Dutra - Dr. Vicente de Paula Dutra (1876–1955)
- Victor Graeff - Victor Oscar Graeff (1906-1965), state deputy

== Rondônia ==
- Costa Marques - Joaquim Augusto da Costa Marques (1861-1939), President of Mato Grosso
- Governador Jorge Teixeira and Teixeirópolis - Jorge Teixeira de Oliveira (1921-1987), creator of the State of Rondonia
- Ministro Andreazza - Colonel Mário Andreazza (1918-1988), Minister of Transport
- Pimenta Bueno - Francisco Antônio Pimenta Bueno (1836-1888), President of the province of Amazonas
- Presidente Médici, Brazil - President Emílio Garrastazu Médici
- Rolim de Moura - António Rolim de Moura Tavares, 1st Count of Azambuja
- Santa Luzia d'Oeste - Saint Lucy of Syracuse
- São Felipe d'Oeste - Saint Philip the Apostle
- São Francisco do Guaporé - Saint Francis of Assisi
- São Miguel do Guaporé - Saint Michael
- Vilhena - Álvaro Coutinho de Melo Vilhena (died on 1904)

== Roraima ==
- Iracema - Iracema Chagas Damasceno (died in 1982), wife of the first non-indigenous colonizer of the region
- São João da Baliza - João Pereira (1942-2020), pioneer and former mayor of the town
- São Luiz - Saint Louis IX of France

== Santa Catarina ==
- Abdon Batista - Dr. Abdon Batista (1852-1922), Mayor of Joinville
- Abelardo Luz - Abelardo Venceslau da Luz (1890-1958), federal deputy
- Alfredo Wagner - Alfredo Henrique Wagner
- Anchieta - Father Joseph of Anchieta
- Angelina - Ângelo Moniz da Silva Ferraz, Baron of Uruguaiana
- Anita Garibaldi and Anitápolis - Anita Garibaldi
- Antônio Carlos - Antônio Carlos Ribeiro de Andrada IV
- Blumenau - Hermann Blumenau (German founder of a colony)
- Brunópolis - Father Bruno Paris (1911-1993)
- Celso Ramos and Governador Celso Ramos - Celso Ramos (1897-1996), Governor of Santa Catarina
- Coronel Freitas - colonel João José de Oliveira Freitas
- Correia Pinto - António Correia Pinto de Macedo (1719-1783), founder of Lages
- Dionísio Cerqueira - Dionísio Evangelista de Castro Cerqueira (1847-1910), Foreign minister
- Dona Emma - Emma Dekke, wife of the director of the Hanseatic Colonization Society
- Doutor Pedrinho - João Pedro Ramos da Silva, father of Governor Aderbal Ramos da Silva
- Florianópolis - President Floriano Peixoto
- Frei Rogério - Friar Rogério Neuhaus (1863-1934), German Franciscan friar, priest and missionary
- Irineópolis - Irineu Bornhausen (1896-1974), Governor of Santa Catarina
- Joinville - François d'Orléans, Prince of Joinville
- José Boiteux - José Artur Boiteux (1865-1934), historian
- Lacerdópolis - Jorge Lacerda (1914-1958), Governor of Santa Catarina
- Lauro Müller - Lauro Müller
- Lebon Régis - General Gustavo Lebon Régis (1874-1930), Contestado War hero
- Leoberto Leal - Leoberto Laus Leal (1912–1958), state deputy
- Major Vieira - Major Tomaz Vieira, first superintendent of Canoinhas
- Orleans - Prince Gaston of Orleans, Count of Eu
- Otacílio Costa - Otacílio Vieira da Costa (1883-1950), state deputy and former mayor of Lages
- Paulo Lopes - Colonel Paulo Lopes Falcão, Azorean immigrant
- Presidente Castelo Branco - President Humberto de Alencar Castelo Branco
- Presidente Getúlio - President Getúlio Vargas
- Presidente Nereu - President Nereu Ramos
- São Bonifácio - Boniface of Brussels
- Santa Cecília - Saint Cecilia
- Santa Helena - Helena, mother of Constantine I
- Santa Rosa de Lima and Santa Rosa do Sul - Rose of Lima
- Santa Terezinha - Thérèse of Lisieux
- Santiago do Sul - James the Great
- Santo Amaro da Imperatriz - Teresa Cristina of the Two Sicilies
- São Bento do Sul - Benedict of Nursia
- São Bernardino - Bernardino of Siena
- São Carlos - Carlos Culmey (1879-1939), German civil engineer
- São Cristóvão do Sul - Saint Christopher
- São Domingos - Saint Dominic
- São Francisco do Sul - Francis of Assisi
- São João do Itaperiú - João Baptista Dal Ri (1874-1937)
- São João do Oeste and São João do Sul - John the Baptist
- São Joaquim - Saint Joachim
- São José, São José do Cedro and São José do Cerrito - Saint Joseph
- São Lourenço do Oeste - Saint Lawrence
- São Ludgero - Saint Ludger
- São Miguel do Oeste - Saint Michael
- São Pedro de Alcântara - Peter of Alcántara
- Schroeder - Christian Mathias Schröder, German senator and colonizer
- Vidal Ramos - Vidal Ramos (politician), Governor of Santa Catarina
- Vitor Meireles - Victor Meirelles, painter

== São Paulo ==
- Alfredo Marcondes - Alfredo Soares Marcondes (founder)
- Altinópolis - Altino Arantes, Governor of São Paulo
- Álvares Florence - Dr. Francisco Álvares Florence (1896-1948), President of the Legislative Assembly
- Álvares Machado - Francisco Álvares Machado (1791-1846), President of the province of Rio Grande do Sul
- Álvaro de Carvalho - Álvaro de Carvalho (1865-1933), federal senator
- Alvinlândia - Major Juvenal Alvim, father of deputy Joviano Alvim
- Américo Brasiliense - Américo Brasiliense, Governor of São Paulo
- Américo de Campos - Américo Brasílio de Campos (1838–1900), lawyer
- Andradina - Antônio Joaquim de Moura Andrade (1889-1962), cattler and founder
- Artur Nogueira - Artur Nogueira, donor of the land
- Bady Bassitt - Bady Bassitt (1917-1960), state deputy
- Barão de Antonina - João da Silva Machado, Baron of Antonina (1782-1875)
- Bento de Abreu - Bento de Abreu Sampaio Vidal (1872-1948), businessman
- Bernardino de Campos - Bernardino de Campos
- Brodowski - Aleksander Brodowski (Polish engineer)
- Cândido Mota - Candido Nazianzeno Nogueira da Mota (1870-1942)
- Cândido Rodrigues - General Antônio Cândido Rodrigues (1850–1934)
- Cerqueira César - Cerqueira César
- Cesário Lange - Cesario Lange Adrien (1843-1899), teacher
- Dumont - Alberto Santos-Dumont
- Engenheiro Coelho - engineer José Luiz Coelho
- Euclides da Cunha Paulista - Euclides da Cunha
- Fernando Prestes - Fernando Prestes de Albuquerque (1855-1937), Governor of São Paulo
- Fernandópolis - Fernando de Sousa Costa (1886-1946), Intervenor of the State of São Paulo
- Francisco Morato - Francisco Antônio de Almeida Morato (1868–1948), lawyer
- Franco da Rocha - Francisco Franco da Rocha (1864–1933), psychiatrist
- Gabriel Monteiro - Dr. Gabriel Monteiro da Silva (1900-1946)
- Gastão Vidigal - Gastão Vidigal (1889–1950), founder of Banco Mercantil de São Paulo
- Gavião Peixoto - Bernardo José Pinto Gavião Peixoto (1791-1859), President of the Province of São Paulo
- Herculândia - Uladislau Herculano de Freitas
- João Ramalho - João Ramalho, first bandeirante
- José Bonifácio - José Bonifácio de Andrada e Silva, Patriach of the independence
- Júlio Mesquita - Júlio César Ferreira de Mesquita (1862–1927), lawyer and journalist
- Junqueirópolis - Álvaro de Oliveira Junqueira (1901-1977)
- Macedônia - João de Mello Macedo (1905-1981), founder
- Mariápolis - Maria J. Bata (1902-1987), wife of Jan A. Bata
- Miguelópolis - Saint Michael
- Monteiro Lobato - Monteiro Lobato, writer
- Oscar Bressane - Oscar Augusto de Barros Bressane (1919-1946)
- Osvaldo Cruz - Oswaldo Cruz, scientist
- Paulo de Faria - Paulo de Faria, former secretary who died in a plane crash
- Pedro de Toledo - Pedro Manuel de Toledo, Governor of São Paulo
- Pereira Barreto - Dr. Luís Pereira Barreto (1840-1923)
- Porto Ferreira - João Inácio Ferreira (1815-1877), ferryman
- Presidente Alves - President Rodrigues Alves
- Presidente Bernardes - President Artur Bernardes
- Presidente Epitácio - President Epitâcio da Silva Pessoa
- Presidente Prudente - President Prudente José de Morais Barros
- Presidente Venceslau - President Venceslau Brás
- Rafard - Júlio Henrique Raffard (1851-1906), businessman
- Regente Feijó - Diogo Feijó
- Rinópolis - Colonel Eugênio Rino, founder
- Rosana - Rosana Camargo de Arruda (b.1942), daughter of a founder of the construction company Camargo Corrêa
- Sandovalina - Antônio Sandoval Neto, founder
- Salesópolis - President Manuel Ferraz de Campos Sales
- São Carlos - Saint Charles
- São Manuel - Saint Manuel (martyr)
- São Paulo - Saint Paul
- São Sebastião - Saint Sebastian
- São Vicente - Saint Vincent
- Sud Mennucci - journalist and educator Sud Mennucci
- Suzanápolis - Suzana Schmidt, wife of Colonel Ernesto Schmidt
- Suzano - engineer Joaquim Augusto Suzano Brandão (1861–1926)
- Teodoro Sampaio - Teodoro Fernandes Sampaio
- Valentim Gentil - Valentim Salvador Gentil (1900-1948), President of the Legislative Assembly of the State of São Paulo
- Zacarias - Antonio Zacarias (1894-1982), founder

== Sergipe ==
- Cedro de São João - John the Baptist
- Cristinápolis - Teresa Cristina of the Two Sicilies
- Frei Paulo - Fray Paulo de Casanova (1813-1891)
- General Maynard - Augusto Maynard Gomes (1886-1957), governor of Sergipe
- Gracho Cardoso - Maurício Graccho Cardoso (1874-1950), state senator of Sergipe
- Simão Dias - Simão Dias, early settler of Sergipe
- Tobias Paulo - Tobias Barreto, poet

== Tocantins ==
- Abreulândia - the Abreu Family
- Augustinópolis - Augusto Pereira Costa, founder
- Bernardo Sayão - Bernardo Sayão Carvalho Araújo (1901-1959), agronomist and politician
- Couto de Magalhães - José Vieira Couto de Magalhães, Governor of Goías
- Darcinópolis - Darcy Gomes Marinho (1909-1973), state deputy
- Fátima - Our Lady of Fátima
- Figueirópolis - Cândido dos Santos Figueira, founder
- Lizarda - Lizarda Maria de Freitas, daughter of the landowner José Benedito da Silva
- Pedro Afonso - Pedro Afonso, Prince Imperial of Brazil
- Presidente Kennedy - John F. Kennedy
- Sandolândia - Sandoval Lopes Nogueira, founder
- Silvanópolis - the Silva Guimarães Family

== See also ==
- List of places named after people
  - List of country subdivisions named after people
  - List of islands named after people
- Buildings and structures named after people
  - List of eponyms of airports
  - List of convention centers named after people
  - List of railway stations named after people
- Lists of places by eponym
- List of eponyms
- Lists of etymologies
