= Presidente Médici =

Presidente Médici may refer to:

- Emílio Garrastazu Médici, President of Brazil from 1969 to 1974
- Presidente Médici, Maranhão, a municipality in Maranhão, Brazil
- Presidente Médici, Rondônia, a municipality in Rondônia, Brazil
- Presidente Médici International Airport, a defunct airport in Brazil
