= Viçoso =

Viçoso may refer to:

- Antônio Ferreira Viçoso (1787–1875), Portuguese Roman Catholic prelate
- Dom Viçoso, municipality in Brazil
