= Regis (place) =

Latin for "of the king" referring to locations

Regis, Latin for "of the king", occurs in numerous English place names. The name usually recalls the historical ownership of lands or manors by the Crown. In other places it honours royal associations rather than ownership. The "Regis" form was often used in the past as an alternative form to "King's", for instance at King's Bromley and King's Lynn.

== Examples in England ==
=== Bedfordshire ===
- Houghton Regis

=== Devon ===
- Salcombe Regis

=== Dorset ===
- Bere Regis
- Lyme Regis
- Melcombe Regis
- Wyke Regis

=== Essex ===
- Hatfield Regis, now Hatfield Broad Oak

=== Gloucestershire ===
- Barton Regis Hundred, which historically included the county of Bristol

=== Kent ===
- Milton Regis

=== Norfolk ===
- Beeston Regis

=== Northamptonshire ===
- Grafton Regis

=== Oxfordshire ===
- Letcombe Regis

=== Somerset ===
- Brompton Regis
- Kingsbury Regis

=== Warwickshire ===
- Newton Regis

=== West Midlands ===
- Rowley Regis
- Tettenhall Regis, Wolverhampton

=== West Sussex ===
- Bognor Regis – In 1929 George V, having spent months recuperating from a serious illness in the seaside resort, allowed it the Regis addition.

== Examples in other countries ==
=== Brazil ===
- Lebon Régis
- Pedro Régis

== See also ==
- List of place names with royal patronage in the United Kingdom
