= Landri =

Landri may refer to:

- Landri Sales, municipality in Brazil
- Derek Landri (born 1983), American football player
