= Dom Expedito Lopes =

Coordinates: 6.95889°S 41.6408°W

- Municipality
- Flag

- Country: Brazil
- Region: Nordeste
- State: Piauí
- Mesoregion: Sudeste Piauiense

Population (2020)
  - Total: 6,922
- Time zone: UTC−3 (BRT)

Dom Expedito Lopes is a municipality in the state of Piauí in the Northeast region of Brazil.

The name is a homage to the Catholic bishop Francisco Expedito Lopes (1914-1957).

== See also ==
- List of municipalities in Piauí
