= Dr. Orlando =

Brazilian politician (born 1978)

Member-elect of the Chamber of Deputies
- Assuming office 1 February 2027
- Constituency: Maranhão

Personal details
- Born: Orlando Mauro Sousa Arouche; 20 March 1978 (age 48) São Luís, Maranhão, Brazil
- Party: PL
- Other political affiliations: PPS; PCdoB
- Profession: Physician

Orlando Mauro Sousa Arouche (born 20 March 1978), better known as Dr. Orlando, is a Brazilian politician who was elected member of the Chamber of Deputies in 2026. He received 82.827 votes or 2.09% of the valid votes in the state.

From 2017 to 2024, he served as mayor of Senador Alexandre Costa.
