= Vieirópolis =

Coordinates: 6.50694°S 38.2558°W

- Municipality
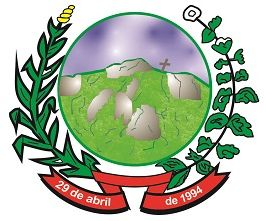
- Coat of arms
- Interactive map of Vieirópolis
- Country: Brazil
- Region: Northeast
- State: Paraíba
- Mesoregion: Sertao Paraibana

Population (2020)
  - Total: 5,372
- Time zone: UTC−3 (BRT)

Vieirópolis is a municipality in the state of Paraíba in the Northeast Region of Brazil.

== See also ==
- List of municipalities in Paraíba
