= Anahy =

Coordinates: 24.6439°S 53.135°W

- Municipality
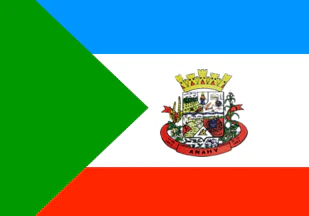
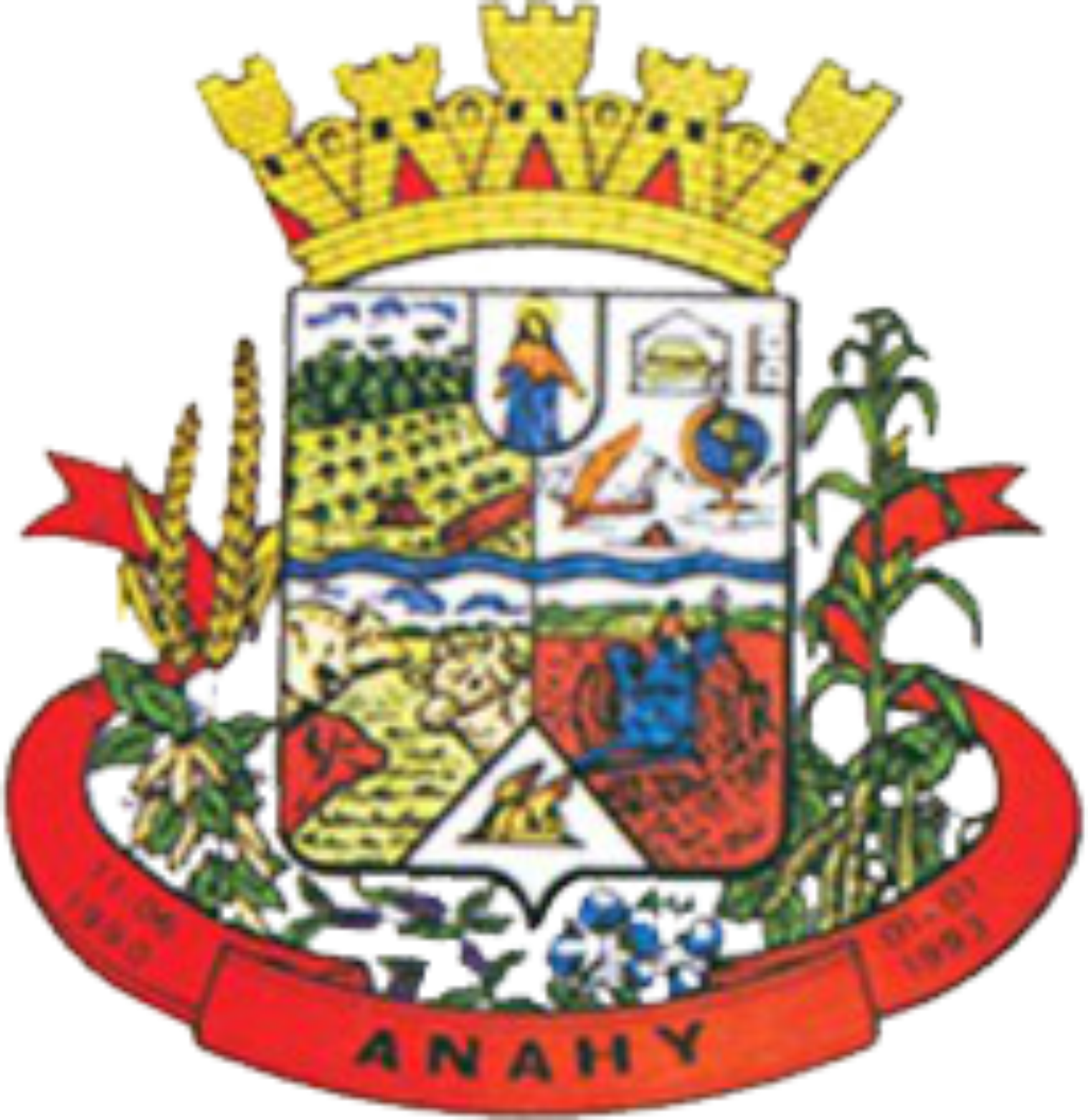
- Flag Coat of arms
- Interactive map of Anahy
- Country: Brazil
- Region: Southern
- State: Paraná
- Mesoregion: Oeste Paranaense

Population (2020)
  - Total: 2,788
- Time zone: UTC−3 (BRT)

Anahy is a municipality in the state of Paraná in the Southern Region of Brazil.

== See also ==
- List of municipalities in Paraná
