= Santa Rosa de Lima, Santa Catarina =

Coordinates: 28°02′21″S 49°07′40″W

- Municipality
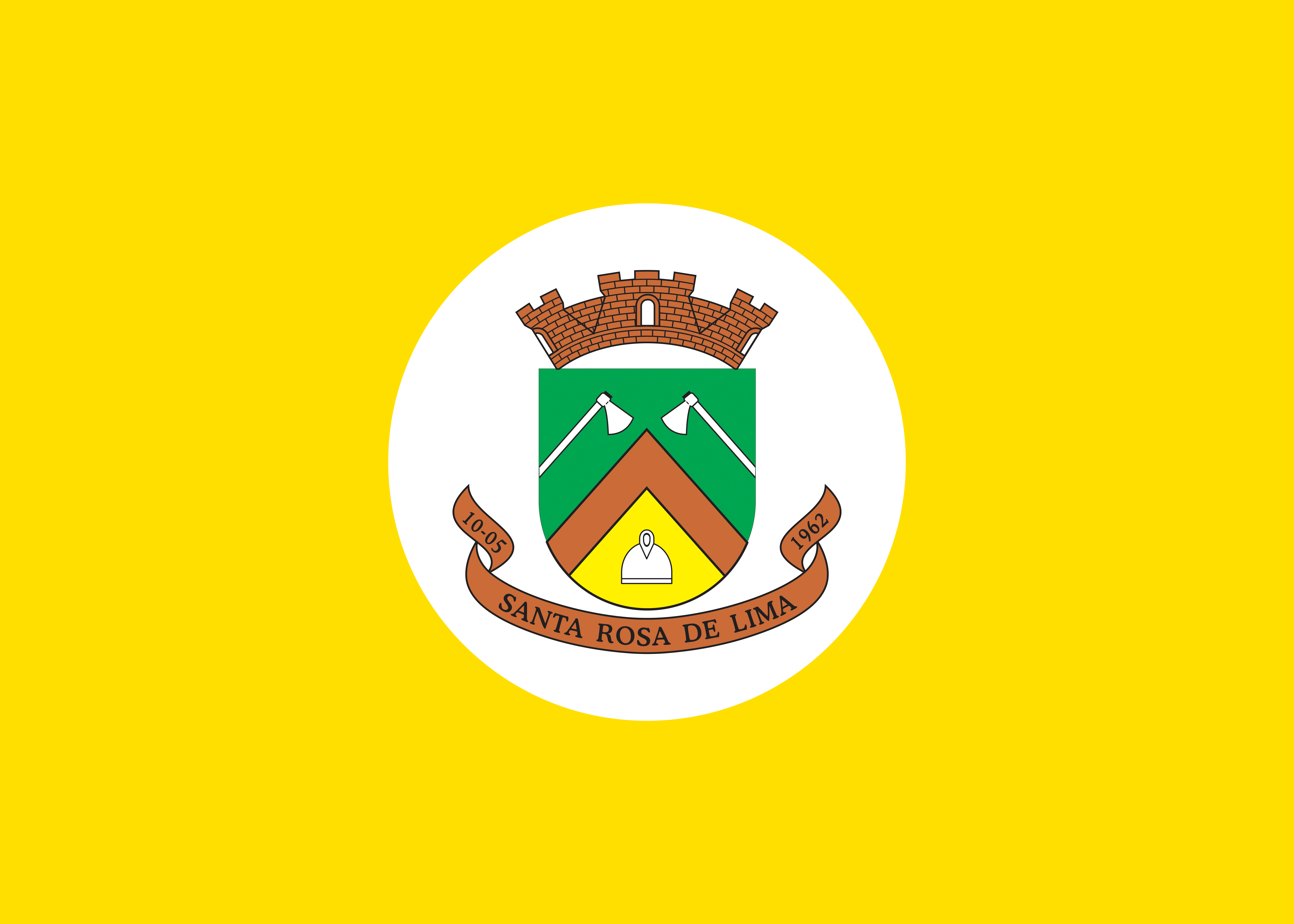
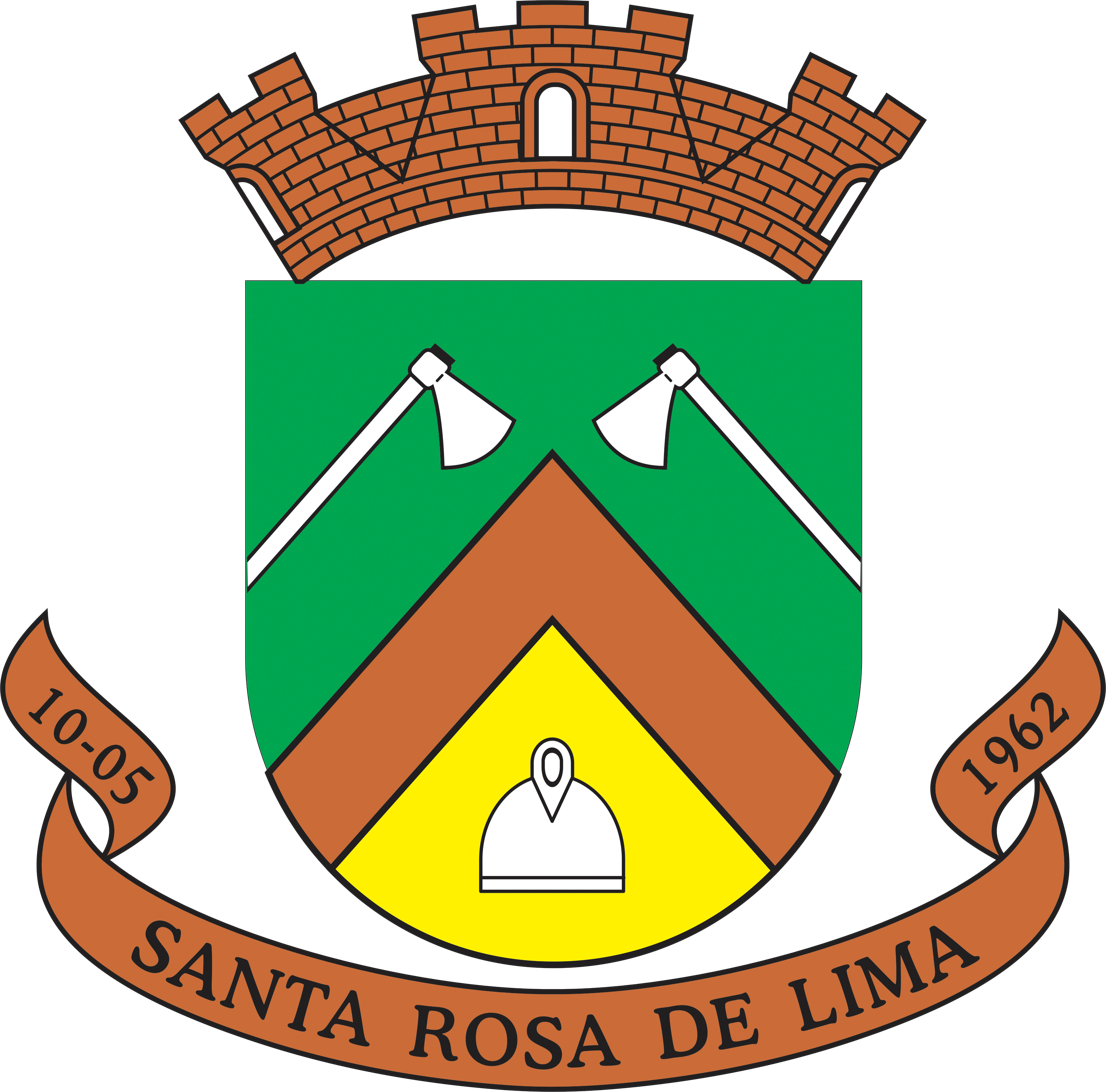
- Flag Coat of arms
- Interactive map of Santa Rosa de Lima, Santa Catarina
- Country: Brazil
- Region: South
- State: Santa Catarina
- Mesoregion: Sul Catarinense

Population (2010)
  - Total: 2,065
- Time zone: UTC -3
- Website: santarosadelima.sc.gov.br

Santa Rosa de Lima, Santa Catarina is a municipality in the state of Santa Catarina in the South region of Brazil.

== See also ==
- List of municipalities in Santa Catarina
