= Sátiro Dias =

Coordinates: 11°36′S 38°36′W

- Municipality
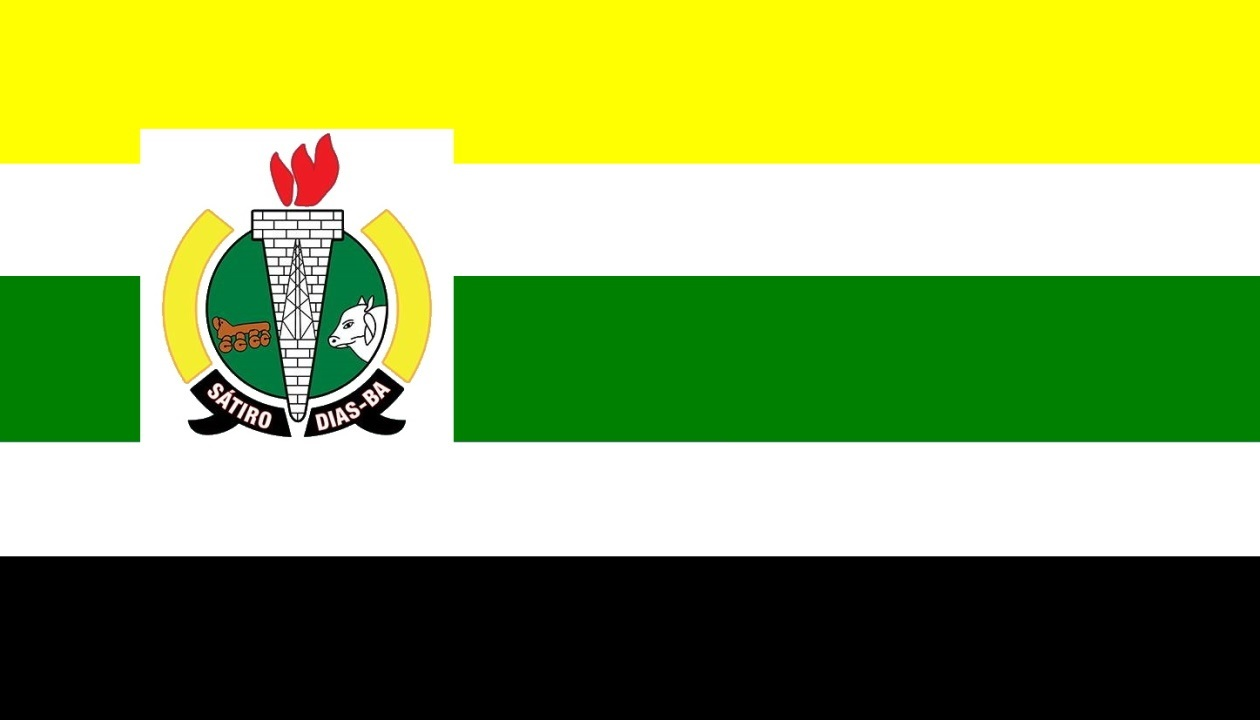
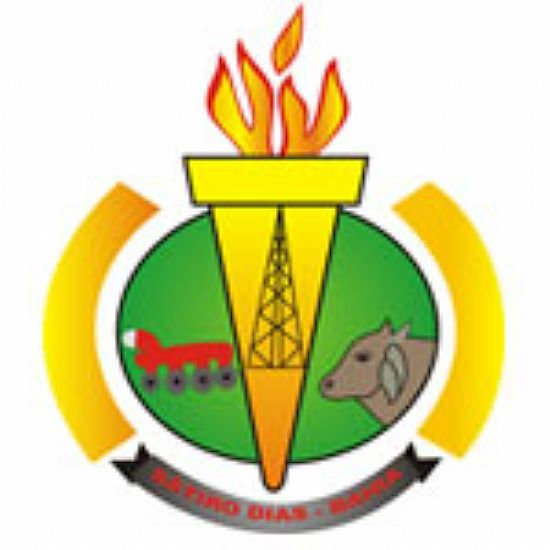
- Flag Coat of arms
- Interactive map of Sátiro Dias
- Country: Brazil
- Region: Nordeste
- State: Bahia

Population (2020)
  - Total: 17,302
- Time zone: UTC−3 (BRT)

Sátiro Dias is a municipality in the state of Bahia in the North-East region of Brazil.

== See also ==
- List of municipalities in Bahia
