= Paes Landim =

Coordinates: 7°48′S 42°16′W

- Municipality
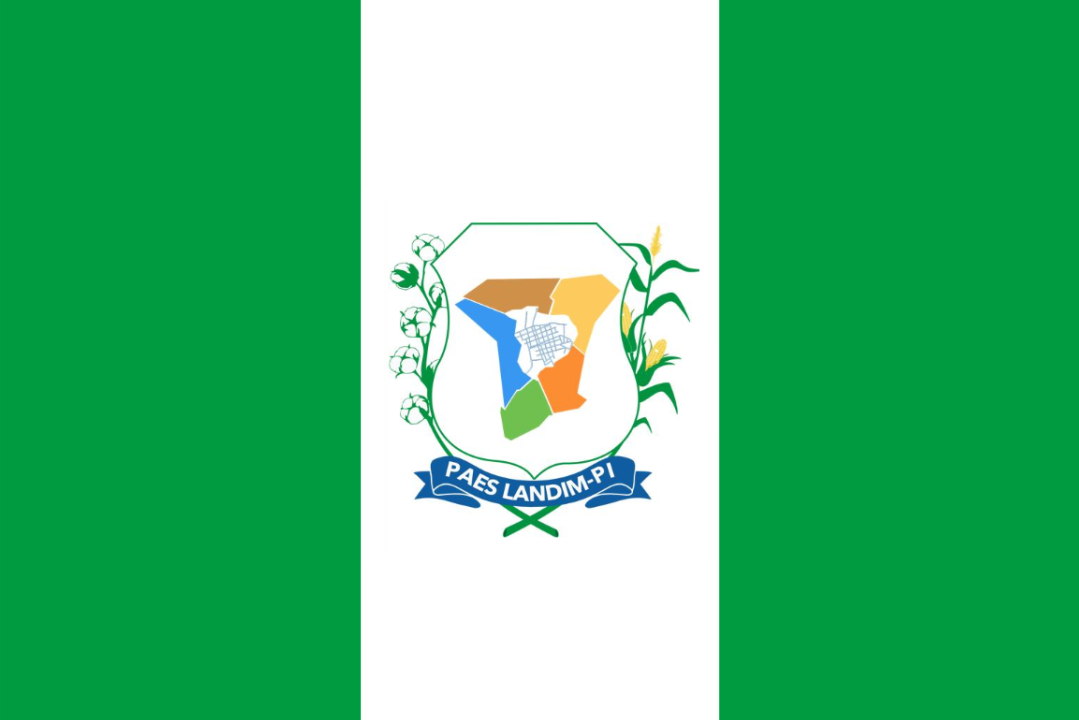
- Flag

- Country: Brazil
- Region: Nordeste
- State: Piauí
- Mesoregion: Sudeste Piauiense

Population (2020)
  - Total: 4,126
- Time zone: UTC−3 (BRT)

Paes Landim is a municipality in the state of Piauí in the Northeast region of Brazil.

== See also ==
- List of municipalities in Piauí
