= Pedro Alexandre =

Municipality of Bahia, Brazil

Coordinates: 10°00′50″S 37°53′38″W

- Municipality
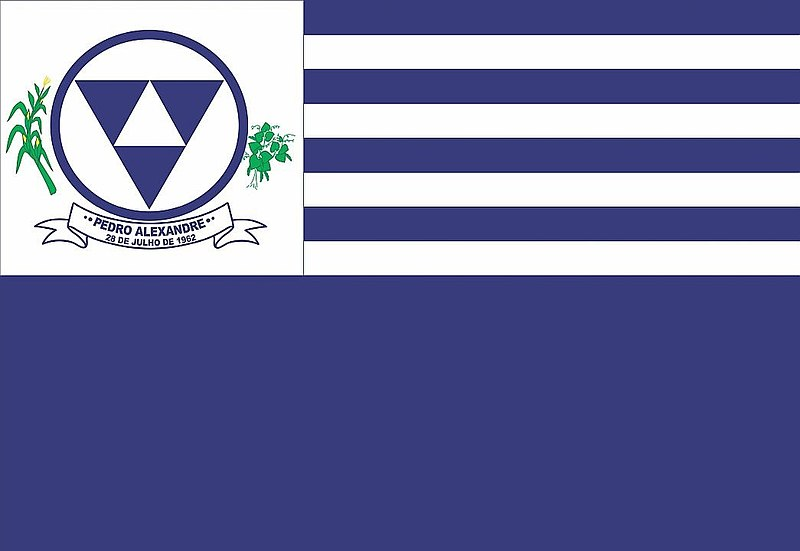
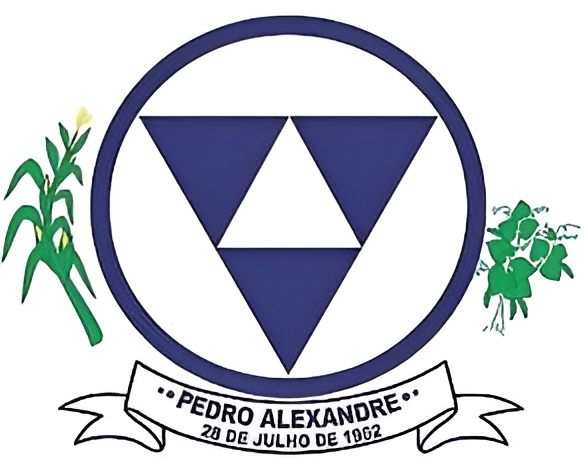
- Flag Coat of arms
- Interactive map of Pedro Alexandre
- Country: Brazil
- Region: Nordeste
- State: Bahia

Population (2020)
  - Total: 16,682
- Time zone: UTC−3 (BRT)

Pedro Alexandre is a municipality in the state of Bahia in the North-East region of Brazil.

== See also ==
- List of municipalities in Bahia
