= Dom Silvério =

Brazilian municipality located in the state of Minas Gerais

Coordinates: 20°09′S 42°58′W

- Municipality
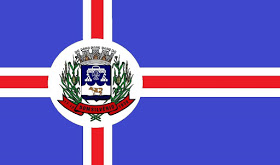
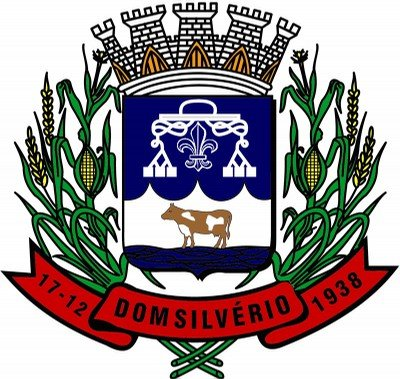
- Flag Coat of arms
- Interactive map of Dom Silvério
- Country: Brazil
- State: Minas Gerais
- Region: Southeast
- Time zone: UTC−3 (BRT)

Location of Dom Silvério within Minas Gerais

Dom Silvério is a municipality in the Brazilian state of Minas Gerais. As of 2020, the estimated population was 5,232.

== See also ==
- List of municipalities in Minas Gerais
