= Presidente Jânio Quadros =

Municipality of Bahia, Brazil

Coordinates: 14°41′20″S 41°40′40″W

- Municipality
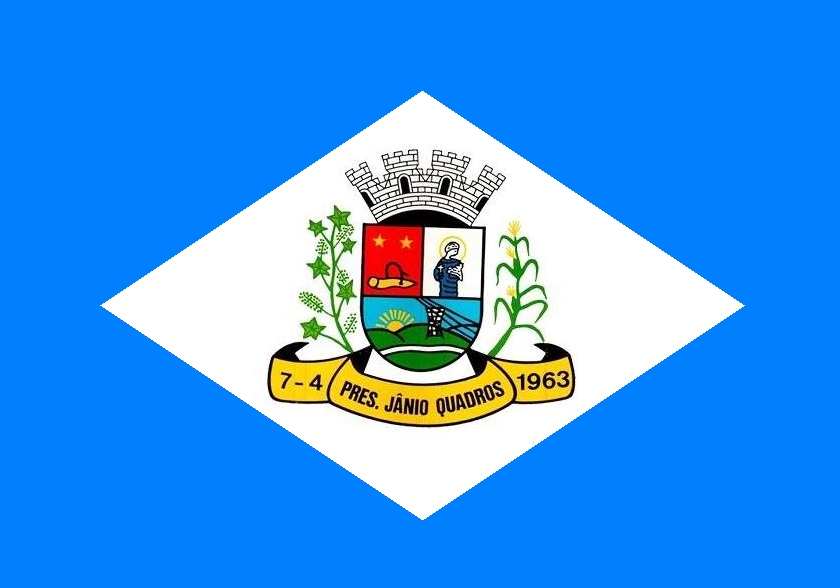
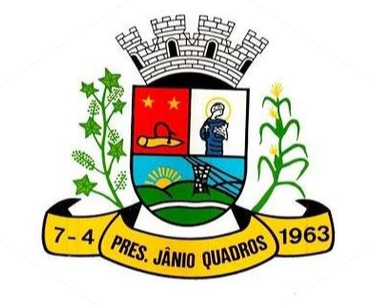
- Flag Coat of arms
- Interactive map of Presidente Jânio Quadros
- Country: Brazil
- Region: Nordeste
- State: Bahia

Population (2020)
  - Total: 12,179
- Time zone: UTC−3 (BRT)

Presidente Jânio Quadros is a municipality in the state of Bahia in the North-East region of Brazil.

== See also ==
- List of municipalities in Bahia
