= Santiago do Sul =

Coordinates: 26.6394°S 52.6847°W

- Municipality
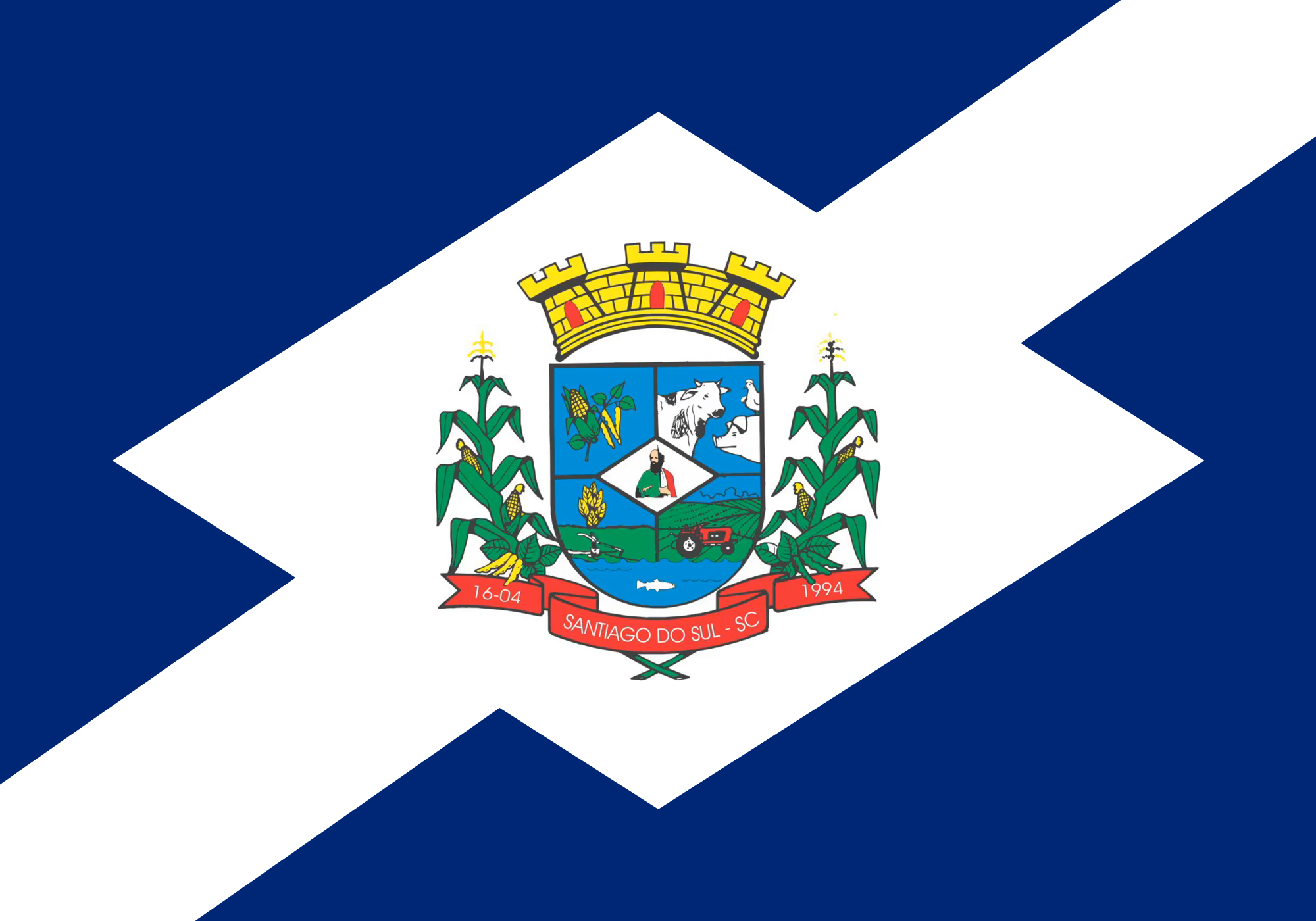
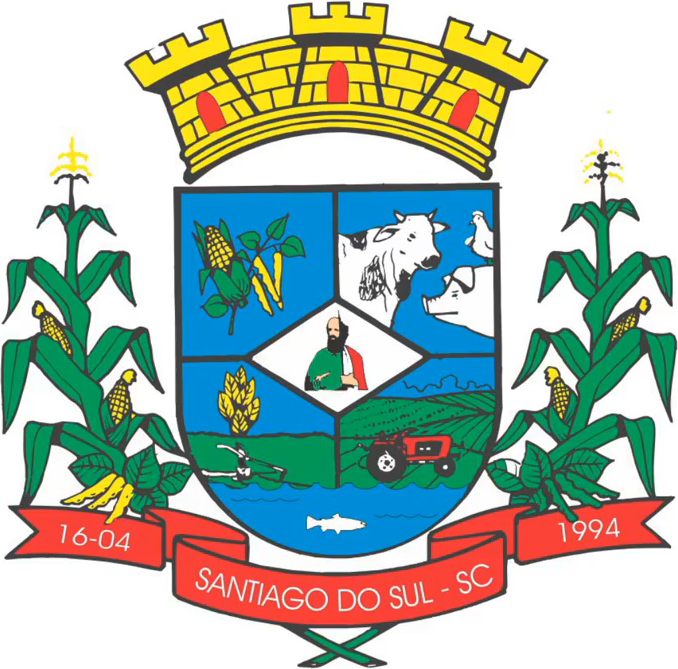
- Flag Coat of arms
- Interactive map of Santiago do Sul
- Country: Brazil
- Region: South
- State: Santa Catarina
- Mesoregion: Oeste Catarinense

Population (2020)
  - Total: 1,235
- Time zone: UTC -3
- Website: www.santiagodosul.sc.gov.br

Santiago do Sul is a municipality in the state of Santa Catarina in the South region of Brazil. It was created in 1994 out of the existing municipality of Quilombo.

== See also ==
- List of municipalities in Santa Catarina
