= Santa Helena, Santa Catarina =

Santa Helena
- Municipality
- The Municipality of Santa Helena
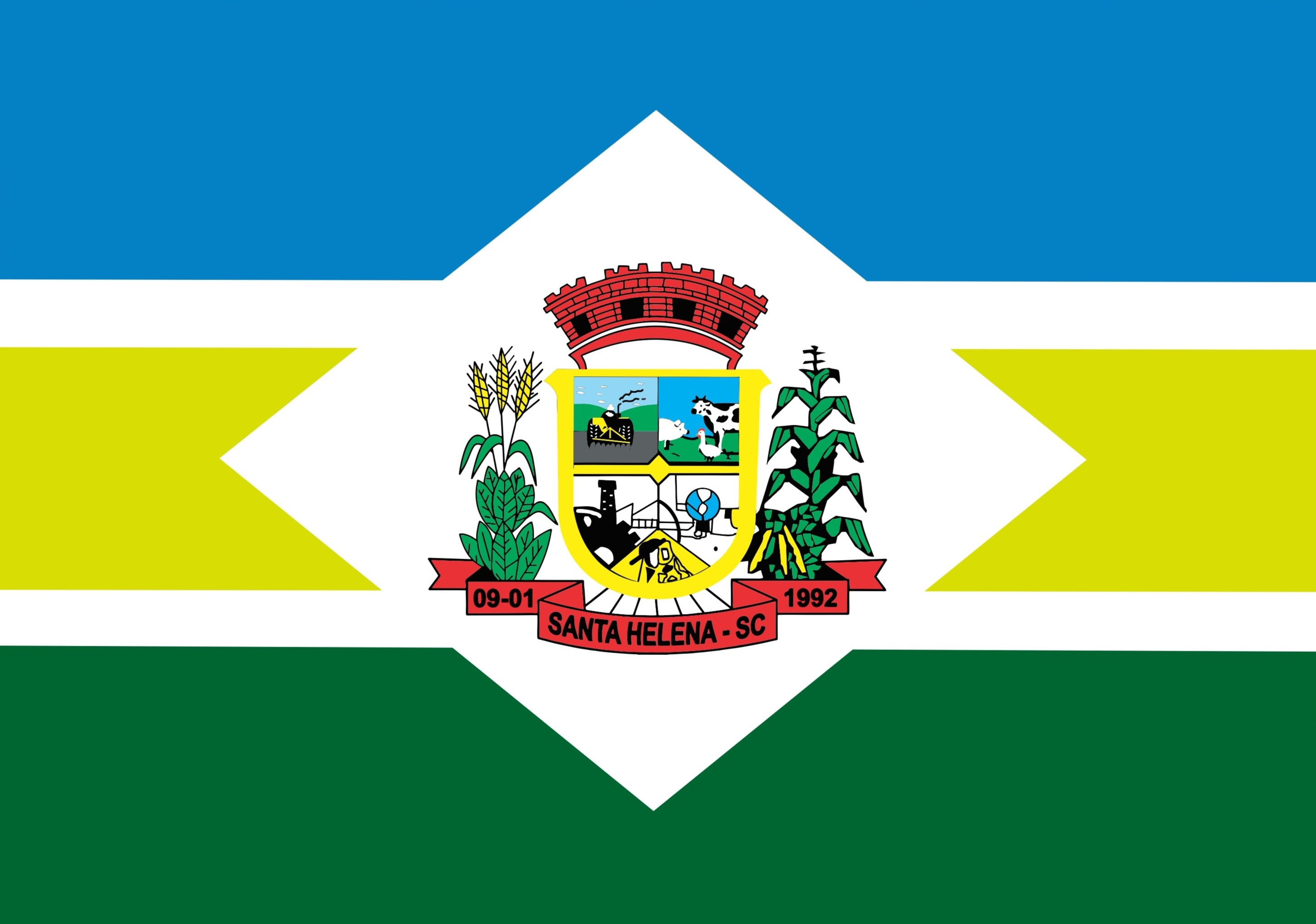
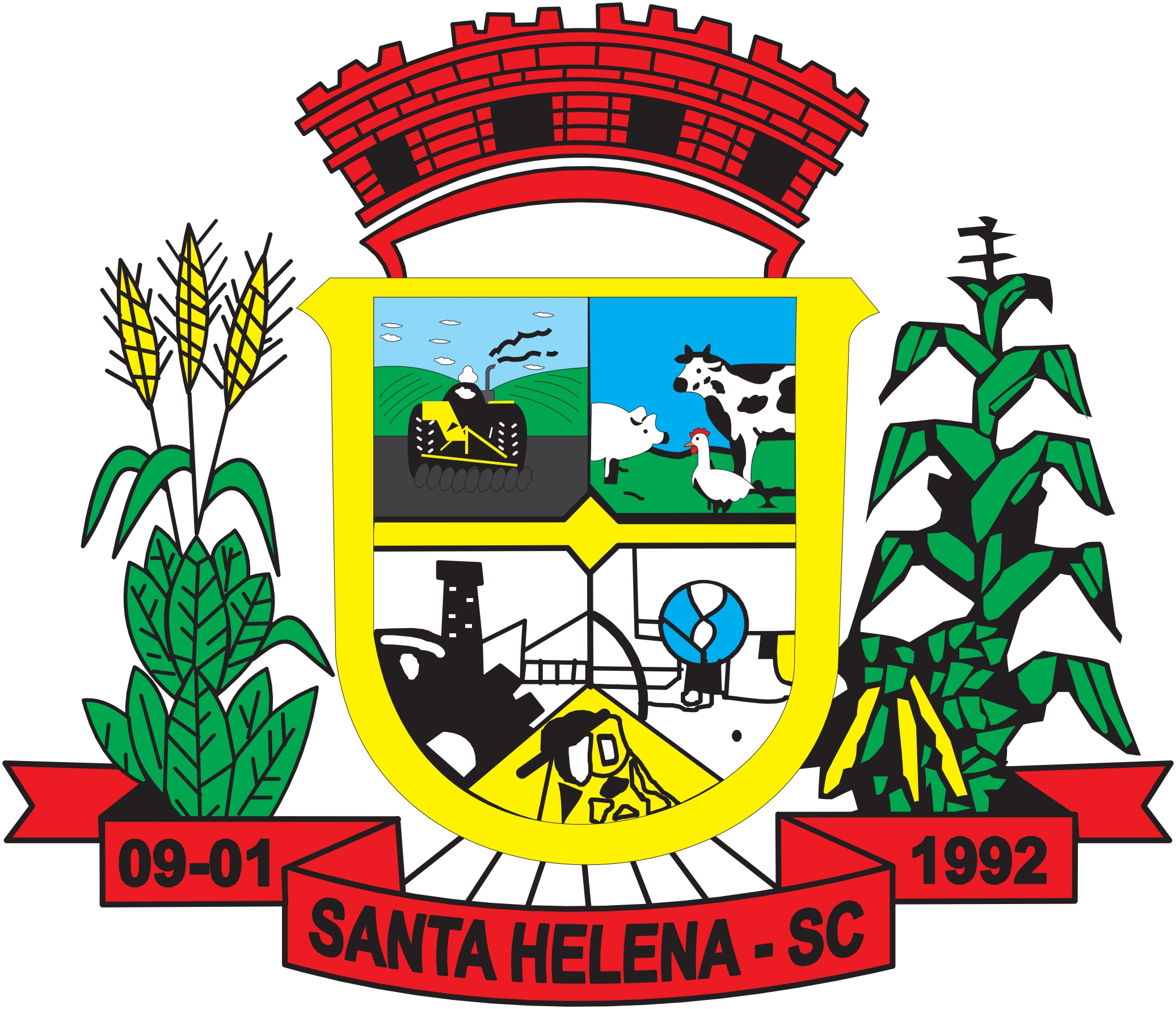
- Flag Coat of arms

- Location of Santa Helena in Santa Catarina state
- Coordinates: 26°56′16″S 53°37′08″W
- Country: Brazil
- Region: South
- State: Santa Catarina
- Founded: January 9, 1992

Government
  - Mayor: Gilberto Giordano (PMDB)

Area
  - Total: 80.982 km^{2} (31.267 sq mi)
- Elevation: 530 m (1,740 ft)

Population (2020)
  - Total: 2,200
  - Density: 27/km^{2} (70/sq mi)
- Time zone: UTC-3 (UTC-3)
  - Summer (DST): UTC-2 (UTC-2)
- HDI (2000): 0.787 – medium
- Website: www.santahelena.sc.gov.br

Santa Helena is a municipality in the state of Santa Catarina in the South region of Brazil.

== See also ==
- List of municipalities in Santa Catarina
