= São Bernardino =

Coordinates: 26.47°S 52.9644°W

- Municipality
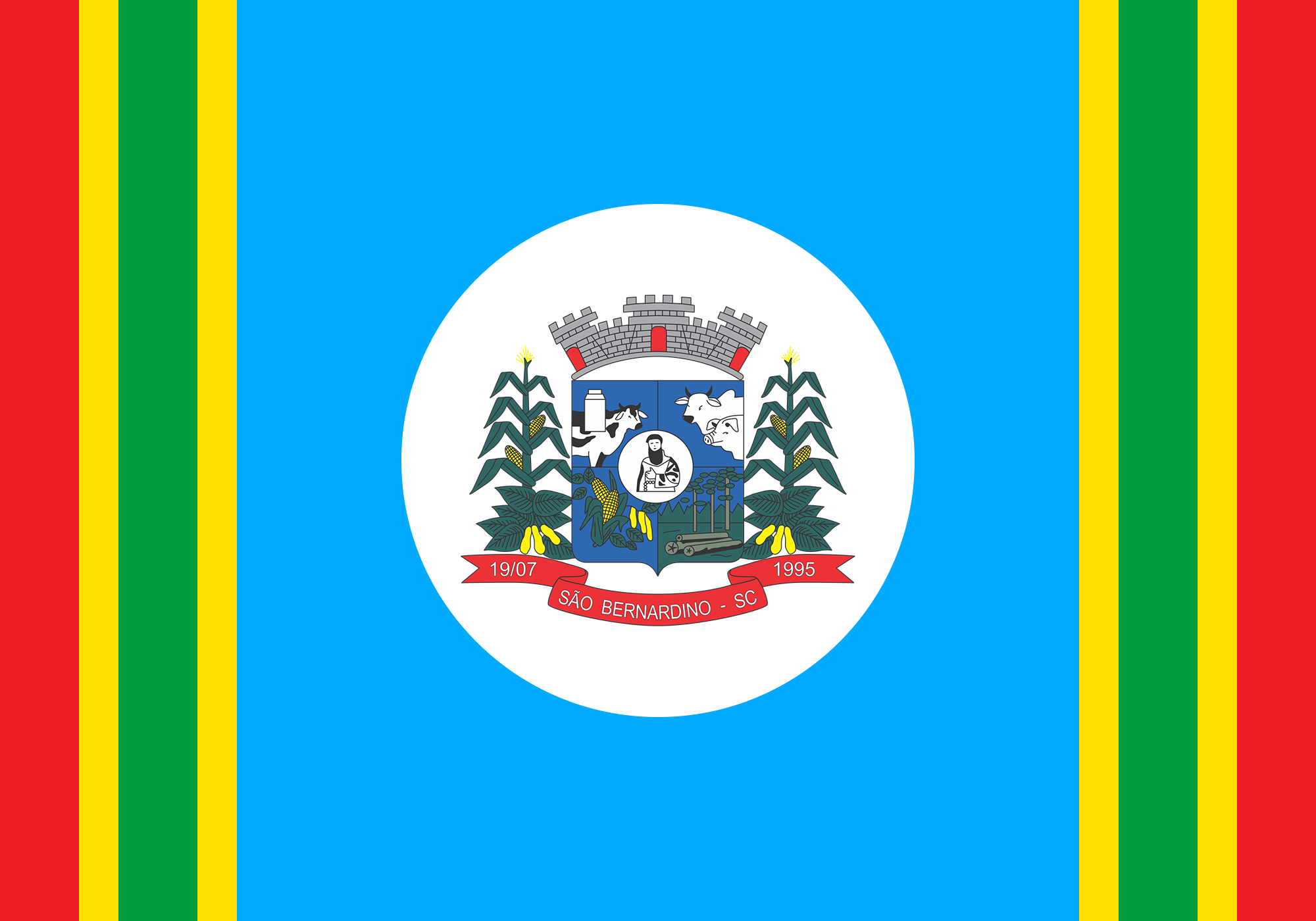
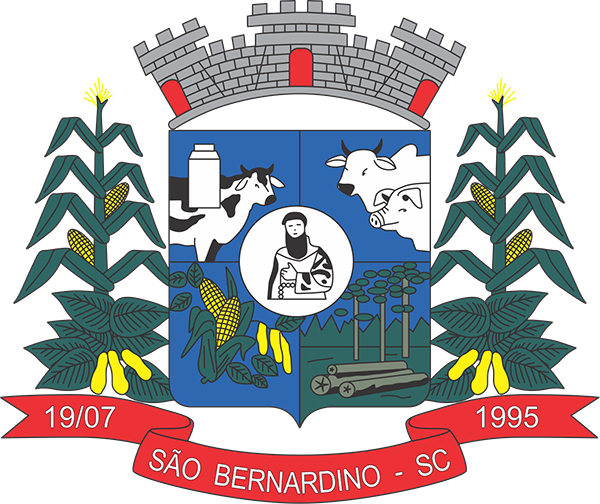
- Flag Coat of arms
- Interactive map of São Bernardino
- Country: Brazil
- Region: South
- State: Santa Catarina
- Mesoregion: Oeste Catarinense

Population (2020)
  - Total: 2,287
- Time zone: UTC -3
- Website: www.saobernardino.sc.gov.br

São Bernardino is a municipality in the state of Santa Catarina in the South region of Brazil. It was created in 1995 out of the municipality of Campo Erê.

== See also ==
- List of municipalities in Santa Catarina
