= Cândido de Abreu =

Coordinates: 24°35′S 51°20′W

- Municipality
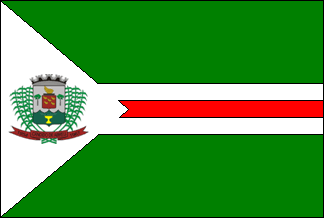
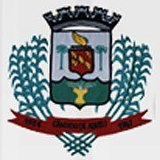
- Flag Coat of arms
- Interactive map of Cândido de Abreu
- Country: Brazil
- Region: Southern
- State: Paraná
- Mesoregion: Norte Central Paranaense

Population (2020)
  - Total: 14,809
- Time zone: UTC−3 (BRT)

Cândido de Abreu is a municipality in the state of Paraná in the Southern Region of Brazil.

== Climate ==
Climate data for Cândido de Abreu, elevation 645 m (2,116 ft), (1976–2005 normals, extremes 1989–1998)
Month	Jan	Feb	Mar	Apr	May	Jun	Jul	Aug	Sep	Oct	Nov	Dec	Year
Record high °C (°F)	34.8 (94.6)	34.5 (94.1)	34.8 (94.6)	32.1 (89.8)	30.3 (86.5)	28.3 (82.9)	29.0 (84.2)	33.8 (92.8)	34.9 (94.8)	34.2 (93.6)	35.0 (95.0)	35.1 (95.2)	35.1 (95.2)
Mean daily maximum °C (°F)	29.3 (84.7)	29.3 (84.7)	28.4 (83.1)	26.5 (79.7)	23.2 (73.8)	21.3 (70.3)	21.6 (70.9)	24.3 (75.7)	24.9 (76.8)	26.7 (80.1)	28.7 (83.7)	29.7 (85.5)	26.2 (79.1)
Daily mean °C (°F)	23.1 (73.6)	22.9 (73.2)	22.0 (71.6)	19.8 (67.6)	16.7 (62.1)	14.9 (58.8)	14.4 (57.9)	16.6 (61.9)	18.0 (64.4)	20.1 (68.2)	21.8 (71.2)	23.0 (73.4)	19.4 (67.0)
Mean daily minimum °C (°F)	19.1 (66.4)	19.1 (66.4)	18.1 (64.6)	15.8 (60.4)	12.9 (55.2)	11.1 (52.0)	10.1 (50.2)	11.9 (53.4)	13.5 (56.3)	15.7 (60.3)	16.9 (62.4)	18.5 (65.3)	15.2 (59.4)
Record low °C (°F)	11.0 (51.8)	10.3 (50.5)	9.9 (49.8)	4.8 (40.6)	1.5 (34.7)	−2.5 (27.5)	−1.6 (29.1)	−1.5 (29.3)	3.4 (38.1)	6.2 (43.2)	8.6 (47.5)	11.5 (52.7)	−2.5 (27.5)
Average precipitation mm (inches)	260.4 (10.25)	137.4 (5.41)	170.0 (6.69)	122.3 (4.81)	128.3 (5.05)	124.5 (4.90)	140.9 (5.55)	73.8 (2.91)	178.4 (7.02)	193.3 (7.61)	122.4 (4.82)	174.3 (6.86)	1,826 (71.88)
Average precipitation days (≥ 1.0 mm)	18	15	14	10	8	8	8	7	12	14	12	14	140
Average relative humidity (%)	78	79	79	79	80	82	76	70	71	73	69	73	76
Mean monthly sunshine hours	199.1	186.2	210.1	216.4	210.5	178.6	214.6	211.6	173.3	200.7	228.8	231.3	2,461.2
Source 1: Empresa Brasileira de Pesquisa Agropecuária (EMBRAPA)
Source 2: IDR-Paraná (precipitation and sun 1989–1998)

== See also ==
- List of municipalities in Paraná
