= Lidianópolis =

Coordinates: 24.1089°S 51.6528°W

- Municipality
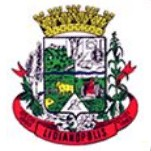
- Coat of arms
- Interactive map of Lidianópolis
- Country: Brazil
- Region: Southern
- State: Paraná
- Mesoregion: Norte Central Paranaense

Population (2020)
  - Total: 3,231
- Time zone: UTC−3 (BRT)

Lidianópolis is a municipality in the state of Paraná in the Southern Region of Brazil.

== See also ==
- List of municipalities in Paraná
