= Antônio Cardoso =

Municipality in the state of Bahia, Brazil

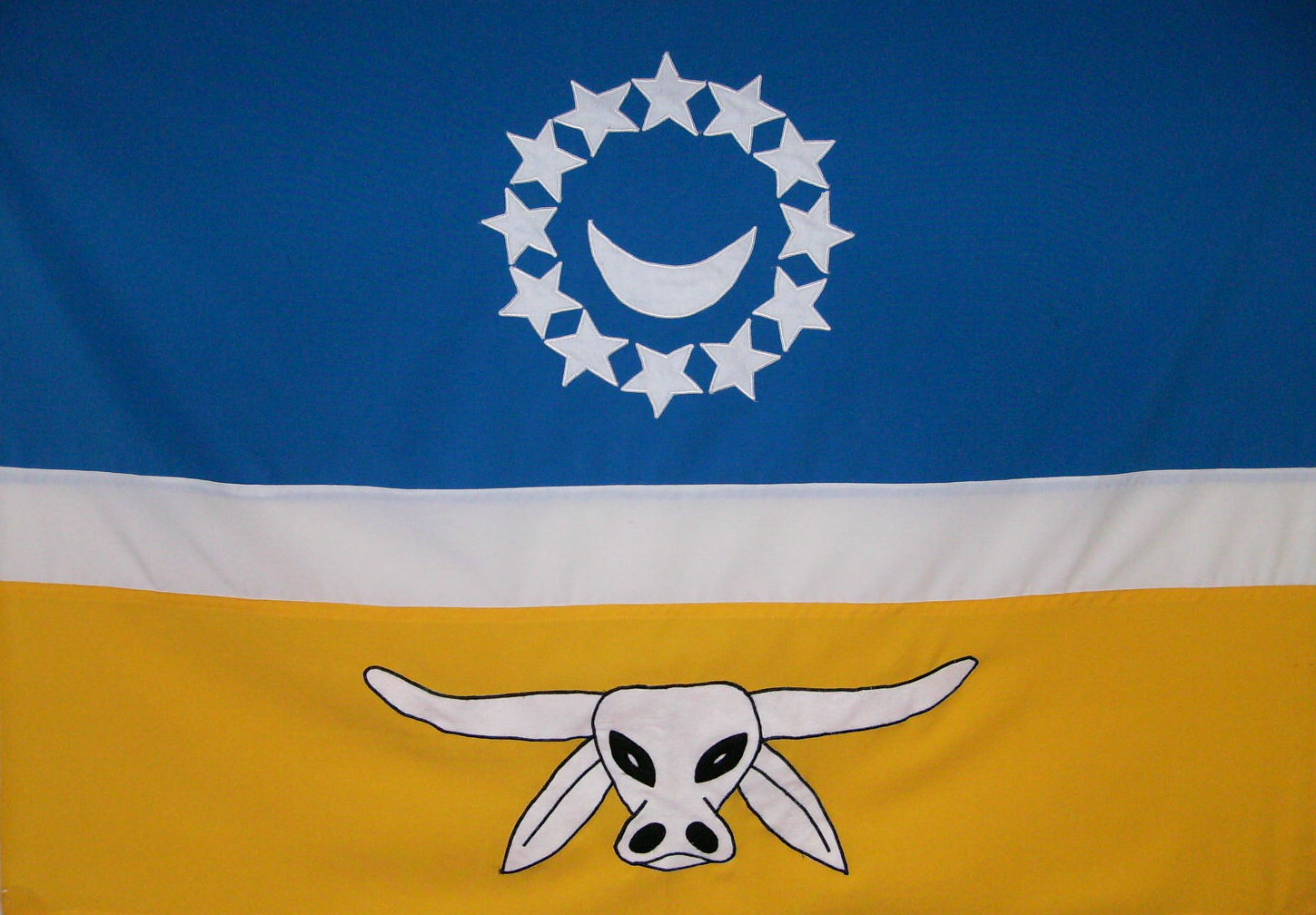
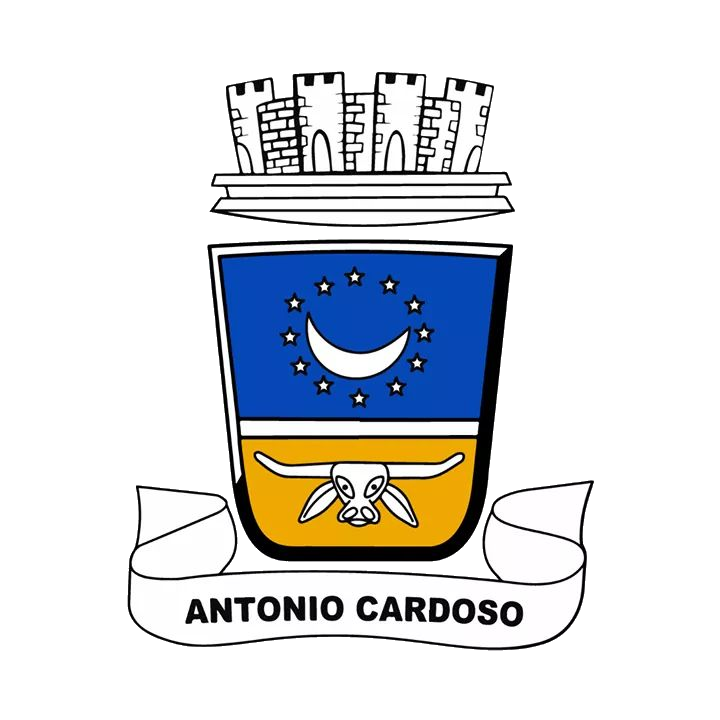
- Flag Coat of arms

- Coordinates: 12°26′06″S 39°07′12″W
- Country: Brazil
- Region: Northeast
- State: Bahia
- Founded: 18 April 1962

Population (2022)
  - Total: 11,146
  - Density: 37.97/km^{2} (98.3/sq mi)
- Demonym: cardosense
- Time zone: UTC−3 (BRT)
- Postal code: 2901700

Antônio Cardoso is a municipality in the state of Bahia in the Northeast region of Brazil. Its name is a tribute to Colonel Antônio Cardoso de Sousa (1848–1932), the former owner of extensive properties and a figure with political and economic power. A namesake grandson was the first mayor of the municipality. The occupation of the territory of Antônio Cardoso began in the 17th century, with Jesuits who built a chapel in honor of Saint Stephen. The former inhabitants were the Paiaiá indigenous people. As of 2022, its population was divided into 55% Black, 40% Pardo, 4.9% White, and 0.1% Indigenous and 0.1% Asian.

== See also ==
- List of municipalities in Bahia
