= Marizópolis =

Coordinates: 6°50′S 38°21′W

- Municipality
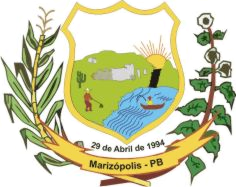
- Flag Coat of arms
- Interactive map of Marizópolis
- Country: Brazil
- Region: Northeast
- State: Paraíba
- Mesoregion: Sertao Paraibana

Population (2010)
  - Total: 6,173
- Time zone: UTC−3 (BRT)

Marizópolis is a municipality in the state of Paraíba in the Northeast Region of Brazil.

== See also ==
- List of municipalities in Paraíba
