= Manfrinópolis =

Coordinates: 26.1439°S 53.3108°W

- Municipality
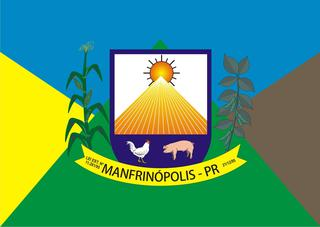
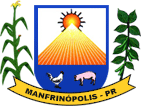
- Flag Coat of arms
- Interactive map of Manfrinópolis
- Country: Brazil
- Region: Southern
- State: Paraná
- Mesoregion: Sudoeste Paranaense

Population (2020)
  - Total: 2,506
- Time zone: UTC−3 (BRT)

Manfrinópolis is a municipality in the state of Paraná in the Southern Region of Brazil.

== See also ==
- List of municipalities in Paraná
