= Rondon, Paraná =

Rondon
- Municipality
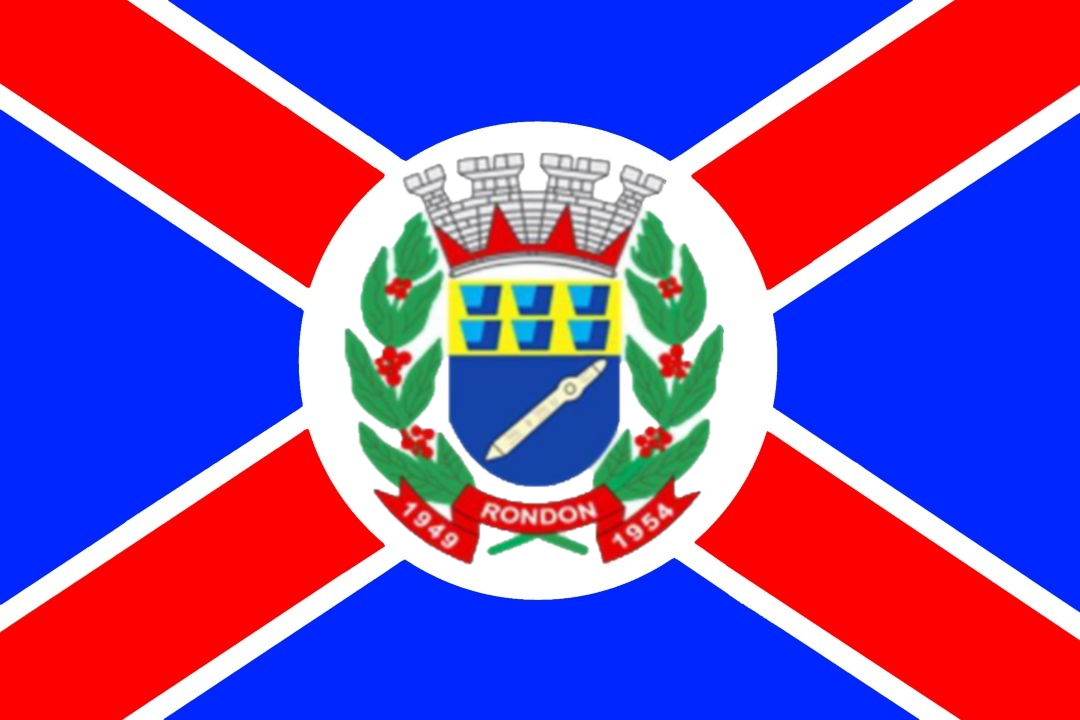
- Flag

- Location in Brazil
- Coordinates: 23°24′39″S 52°45′39″W
- Country: Brazil
- Region: Southern
- State: Paraná
- Mesoregion: Nortoeste Paranaense

Population (2020)
  - Total: 9,622
- Time zone: UTC−3 (BRT)

Rondon is a municipality in the state of Paraná in the Southern Region of Brazil.

== See also ==
- List of municipalities in Paraná
