= Doutor Ulysses =

- Municipality
- Location in Brazil
- Coordinates: 24°34′4″S 49°25′12″W
- Country: Brazil
- Region: Southern
- State: Paraná
- Mesoregion: Metropolitana de Curitiba

Population (2020)
  - Total: 5,552
- Time zone: UTC−3 (BRT)

Doutor Ulysses is a municipality in the state of Paraná in the Southern Region of Brazil.

== Etymology ==
The municipality is named in honor of Ulysses Guimarães, a prominent brazilian politician and lawyer who played a key role in the country's redemocratization process during the 1980s. Following his tragic death in a helicopter crash in October 1992, the Legislative Assembly of Paraná passed State Law No. 10,164 on December 7, 1992, officially renaming the city. The title "Doutor" (Doctor) refers to his background in law and the multiple honorary doctorates (Honoris Causa) he received throughout his career.

The region was initially known as Varzeão when it became an administrative district belonging to Cerro Azul in 1947. Upon gaining political independence and being elevated to municipality status through State Law No. 9,443 on November 20, 1990, the settlement was initially named Vila Branca. Two years later, on December 7, 1992, the current name, Doutor Ulysses, was adopted via State Law No. 10,164 to honor the late politician Ulysses Guimarães, who had died in an aviation accident a couple of months prior. The municipality was officially installed under its current name on January 1, 1993.

== Climate ==
According to the Köppen climate classification, Doutor Ulysses is classified as oceanic climate (Köppen: Cfb), frosts are common on winter.

== See also ==
- List of municipalities in Paraná
