= Maria Helena =

Coordinates: 23°35′S 53°10′W

- Municipality
- Interactive map of Maria Helena
- Country: Brazil
- Region: Southern
- State: Paraná
- Mesoregion: Noroeste Paranaense

Population (2020)
  - Total: 5,634
- Time zone: UTC−3 (BRT)

Maria Helena is a municipality in the state of Paraná in the Southern Region of Brazil.

== See also ==
- List of municipalities in Paraná
