= Cândido Sales =

Municipality of Bahia, Brazil

Coordinates: 15.505°S 41.2389°W

- Municipality
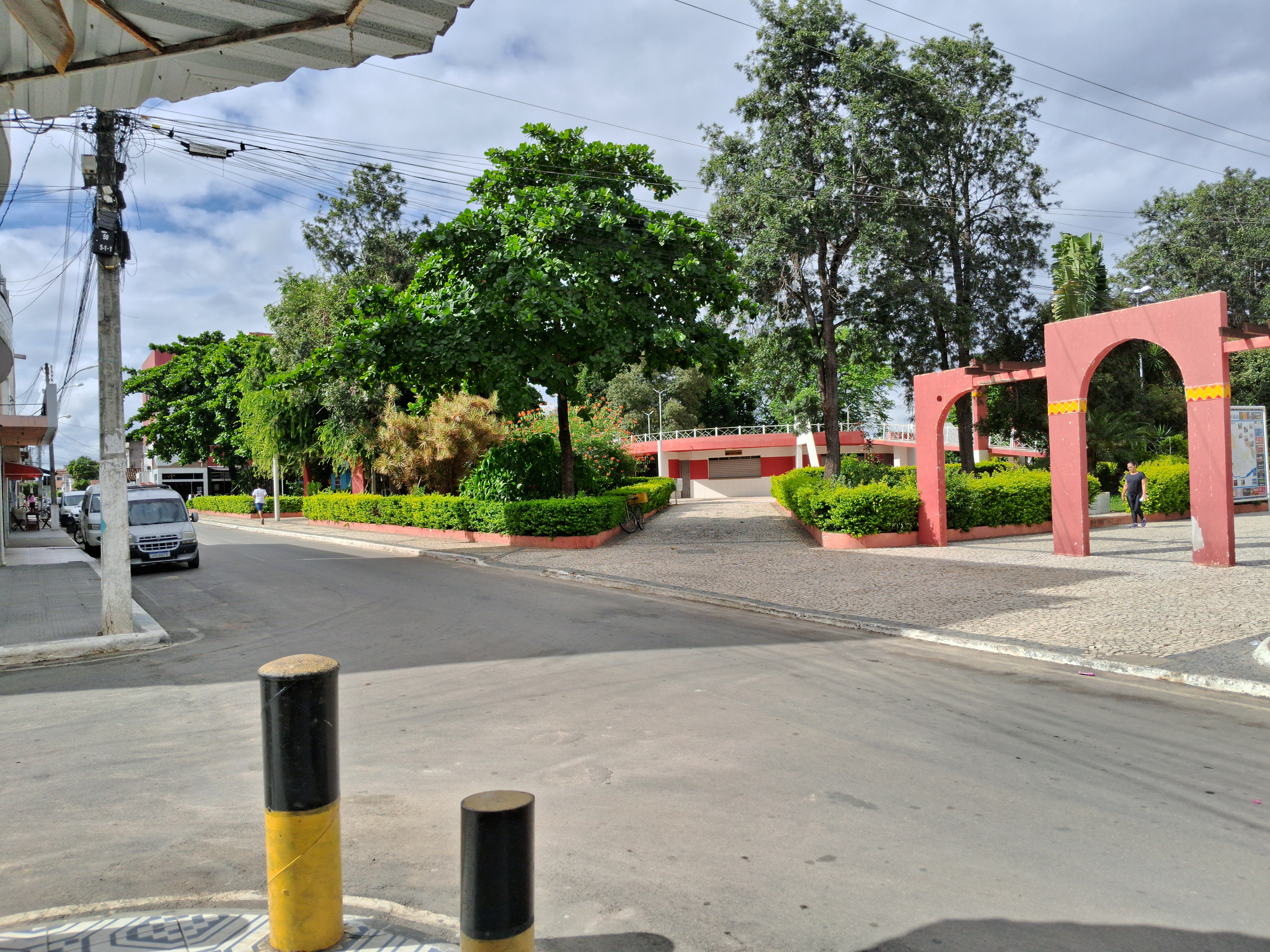
- Main square of Cândido Sales, city center

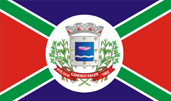
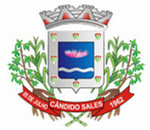
- Flag Coat of arms
- Interactive map of Cândido Sales
- Country: Brazil
- Region: Nordeste
- State: Bahia

Population (2020)
  - Total: 25,053
- Time zone: UTC−3 (BRT)

Cândido Sales is a municipality in the state of Bahia in the North-East region of Brazil.

== See also ==
- List of municipalities in Bahia
