= Belfort Roxo =

- Born: 11 September 1838
- Died: 17 November 1896 (aged 58)
- Occupation: Engineer

Raimundo Teixeira Belfort Roxo, better known as Belfort Roxo (São Luís do Maranhão, 11 September 1838 — Rio de Janeiro, 17 November 1896), was a Brazilian engineer. He was the son of José Rodrigues Roxo and Maria Rita Teixeira Vieira Belfort.

Belfort Roxo was General Inspector of Works of Rio de Janeiro. Along with fellow engineer Paulo de Frontin, Belfort Roxo solved the problem of water shortage suffered by the people of Rio de Janeiro in 1889.

Belfort Roxo expanded the modernization of the port of Sao Luis, Maranhao, and oversaw the construction of the Minas Gerais - Rio de Janeiro Railroad. He was also the director of the Inspector General of Public Works of Rio de Janeiro.

== Education ==
Belfort Roxo earned a Bachelor of Physical and Mathematical Sciences degree at the Central School of Rio de Janeiro, later called the Polytechnic School of Rio de Janeiro. Along with Paulo de Frontin and Pereira Passos, he was sent by D. Pedro II in Europe, to study there. He graduated from the Institute of Civil Engineers in London and the School of Bridges and Sidewalks in Paris.

== Tributes ==
In 1888 the region of Baixada Fluminense suffered a major drought. The city instituted a plan contrived by Paulo de Frontin and Belfort Roxo that involved the transportation of 15 million liters of water to the city of Corte over the course of 6 days. At some point after his death and in tribute for his services in alleviating the drought, his name was given to a sugar plantation around which Nova Iguaçu later grew and enveloped. On 3 April 1990 the city of Belford Roxo was created out of Nova Iguaçu.

In the Copacabana neighborhood of Rio de Janeiro, Belfort Roxo's name was also given to a street.
