= Senador Alexandre Costa =

Coordinates: 5.25583°S 44.0558°W

- Municipality
- Senador Alexandre Costa

- Country: Brazil
- Region: Nordeste
- State: Maranhão
- Mesoregion: Centro Maranhense
- Established: 2024

Government
  - Mayor: Dr. Nilo (REP)

Area
  - Total: 16,466 sq mi (42,646 km^{2})

Population (2020)
  - Total: 11,214
- Time zone: UTC−3 (BRT)
- Website: Senador Alexandre Costa

Senador Alexandre Costa is a municipality in the state of Maranhão in the Northeast region of Brazil.

== Mayors ==
- Dr Nilo (2024-present)
- Dr. Orlando (2017-2024)

== See also ==
- List of municipalities in Maranhão
