= Matias Olímpio =

Coordinates: 3°43′S 42°33′W

- Municipality
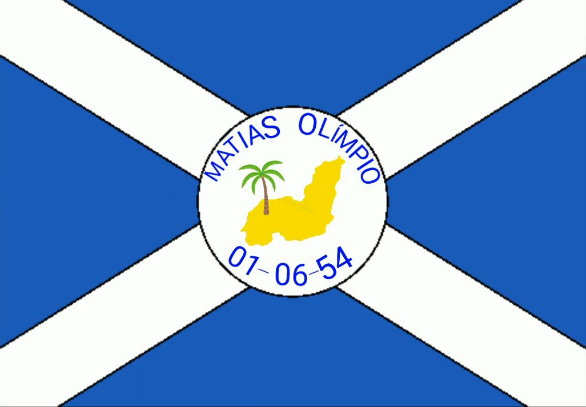
- Flag

- Country: Brazil
- Region: Nordeste
- State: Piauí
- Mesoregion: Norte Piauiense

Population (2020)
  - Total: 10,958
- Time zone: UTC−3 (BRT)

Matias Olímpio is a municipality in the state of Piauí in the Northeast region of Brazil.

== See also ==
- List of municipalities in Piauí
