= Dom Viçoso =

- Municipality
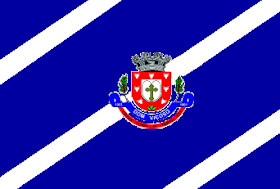
- Flag Coat of arms

- Location in the State of Minas Gerais
- Coordinates: 22°15′14″S 45°09′39″W
- Country: Brazil
- Region: Southeast
- State: Minas Gerais
- Founded: December 12, 1953

Area
  - Total: 113.178 km^{2} (43.698 sq mi)

Population (2020)
  - Total: 2,997
  - Density: 27.9/km^{2} (72/sq mi)
- Time zone: UTC−3 (BRT)
- Postal Code: 37474-000

Dom Viçoso is a municipality in the state of Minas Gerais in the Southeast region of Brazil.

== See also ==
- List of municipalities in Minas Gerais
