= Presidente Médici, Rondônia =

Municipality in Rondônia, Brazil

Presidente Médici
- Municipality
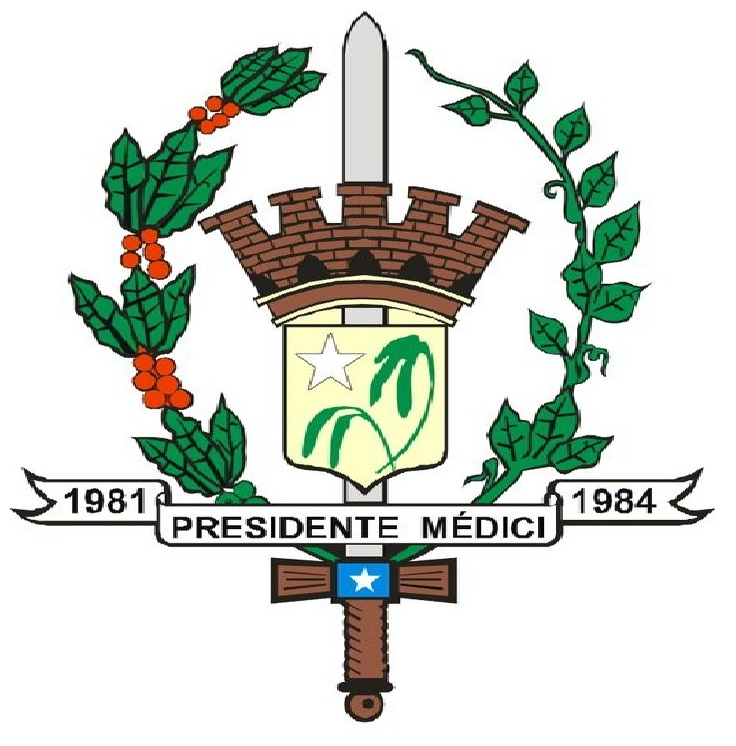
- Flag Coat of arms

- Municipality of Presidente Médici, Brazil
- Coordinates: 11°10′33″S 61°54′03″W

Population (2020)
  - Total: 18,571

Presidente Médici is a municipality located in the Brazilian state of Rondônia. It has a population of 18,571 (2020). Its area is 1,758 km^{2}. Presidente Médici municipality is divided into four bairros (quarters): Centro, Ernandes Gonçalves, Cunha e Silva, and Lino Alves Teixeira.

== Origin of name ==
From 1973 organized as a sub-district named in so-called "homage" to former Brazilian military president Emílio Garrastazu Médici, who had been appointed as president by the military junta, the region was elevated to full municipal status in 1981. Despite his severe rule, which included press censorship and even torture of guerrillas and left-wing groups seeking promote the apply a Cuban modeled dictatorship, Médici remained popular in several parts of Brazil because his rule promoted a period of rapid economic growth.

== History ==
In 1915 Major Cândido Rondon of the Corps of Military Engineers, who was directing the construction of a telegraph line from Cuiabá in neighbouring Mato Grosso state to Santo Antonio do Madeira near Porto Velho, reported that the region was inhabited by rubber tappers and plantation workers in São Pedro do Muqui. The region remained virtually unchanged for about 50 years, until highway construction eventually made the state of Rondônia accessible for colonization. The first settlers arrived in the 1960s, settling in four tents along the muddy right-of-way. The town became known as Vila Trinta e Três, referring to its location 33 km from Vila de Rondônia, now the town of Ji-Paraná.

Settlement activity intensified after 1970, creating conflicts with purported landowner José Milton de Andrade Rios, who accused new arrivals of being squatters invading his land. The settler-occupied lands were situated between the Preto and Leitão streams, which he alleged were part of his property. The National Institute for Colonization and Agrarian Reform (INCRA) attempted to prevent settlement at the site because it was still unclear whether the land in fact belonged to Milton Rios or to the national government. With new settlers continuing to arrive, the village grew, and INCRA Rondônia created the Leitão sector as an extension of the Ouro Preto Integrated Colonization Project to regulate settlement activity.

By mid-1972, the village population had reached 800, and buses linking Cuiabá in Mato Grosso to Porto Velho in Rondônia would stop at the townsite, now having the status of a sub-district. Wanting a new name to replace the prosaic "Vila 33", they put plaques in front of their houses suggesting various names, such as Getúlio Vargas, Presidente Médici, Fátima do Norte, Cruzeiros do Sul, as well as Nova Canaã, Nova Jerusalém, and others. By plebiscite the residents eventually chose "Presidente Médici", a name which Rondônia territorial governor Teodorico Gahyva confirmed as official on July 30, 1973.

== See also ==
- List of municipalities in Rondônia
