= Pedro Régis =

Coordinates: 6.63278°S 35.2969°W

- Municipality
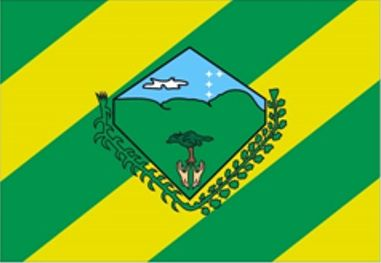
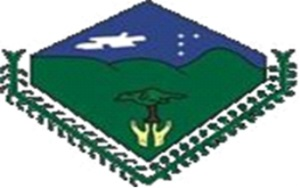
- Flag Coat of arms
- Interactive map of Pedro Régis
- Country: Brazil
- Region: South
- State: Paraíba
- Mesoregion: Mata Paraibana

Population (2020)
  - Total: 6,114
- Time zone: UTC−3 (BRT)

Pedro Régis is a municipality in the state of Paraíba in the Northeast Region of Brazil.

== See also ==
- List of municipalities in Paraíba
