= Landri Sales =

Coordinates: 7°16′S 43°55′W

- Municipality
- Country: Brazil
- Region: Nordeste
- State: Piauí
- Mesoregion: Sudoeste Piauiense

Population (2020)
  - Total: 5,283
- Time zone: UTC−3 (BRT)

Landri Sales is a municipality in the state of Piauí in the Northeast region of Brazil.

== See also ==
- List of municipalities in Piauí
