= Francisco Expedito Lopes =

Brazilian Catholic bishop

- Bishop of Garanhuns
- Church: Catholic Church
- Diocese: Diocese of Garanhuns
- In office: 24 August 1954 – 2 July 1957
- Predecessor: Juvêncio de Brito
- Successor: José Adelino Dantas
- Previous post: Bishop of Oeiras (1948-1954)

Orders
- Ordination: 30 October 1938
- Consecration: 12 December 1948 by José Tupinambá da Frota

Personal details
- Born: 8 July 1914 Meruoca, Ceará, Republic of the United States of Brazil
- Died: 2 July 1957 (aged 42) Garanhuns, Pernambuco, Republic of the United States of Brazil

Francisco Expedito Lopes (8 July 1914 – 2 July 1957) was a Brazilian Catholic bishop.

== Biography ==
He was born in Sítio Jerusalém (Vila de Meruoca) in Sobral, in the state of Ceará. He was ordained a priest in Rome in 1938, bishop in Sobral in 1948, and was elected first bishop in Oeiras, in the state of Piauí. In 1955, he was sworn in as the fifth bishop of Garanhuns in the state of Pernambuco. He founded the Institute of the Missionaries of Our Lady of Fatima of Brazil. He was shot by Father Hosana de Siqueira e Silva in Garanhuns on 1 July 1957, and died the next day.

His motto was "Restore everything in Christ."

Considered a saint by the population, Don Acácio Rodrigues Alves became the postulator of his beatification in the Diocese of Garanhuns.
