= Presidente Médici, Maranhão =

Coordinates: 2°23′S 45°48′W

Presidente Médici
- Municipality
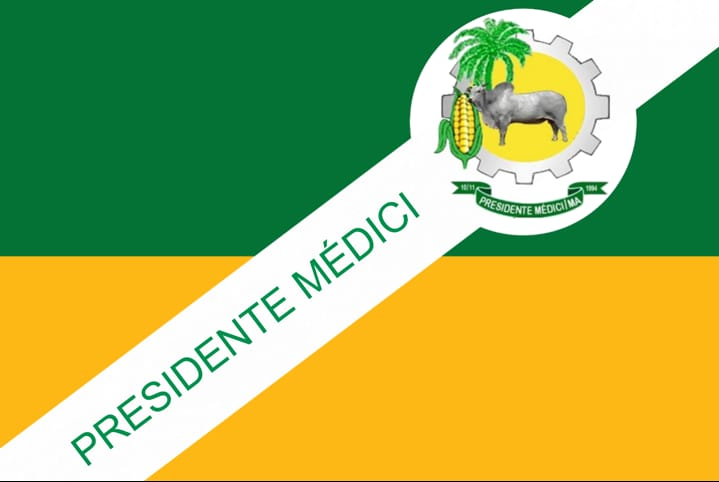
- Flag
- Interactive map of Presidente Médici
- Country: Brazil
- Region: Nordeste
- State: Maranhão
- Mesoregion: Oeste Maranhense

Population (2020)
  - Total: 7,070
- Time zone: UTC−3 (BRT)

Presidente Médici is a municipality in the state of Maranhão in the Northeast region of Brazil.

== See also ==
- List of municipalities in Maranhão
