= Saint Anne =

Mother of Mary in Christian tradition

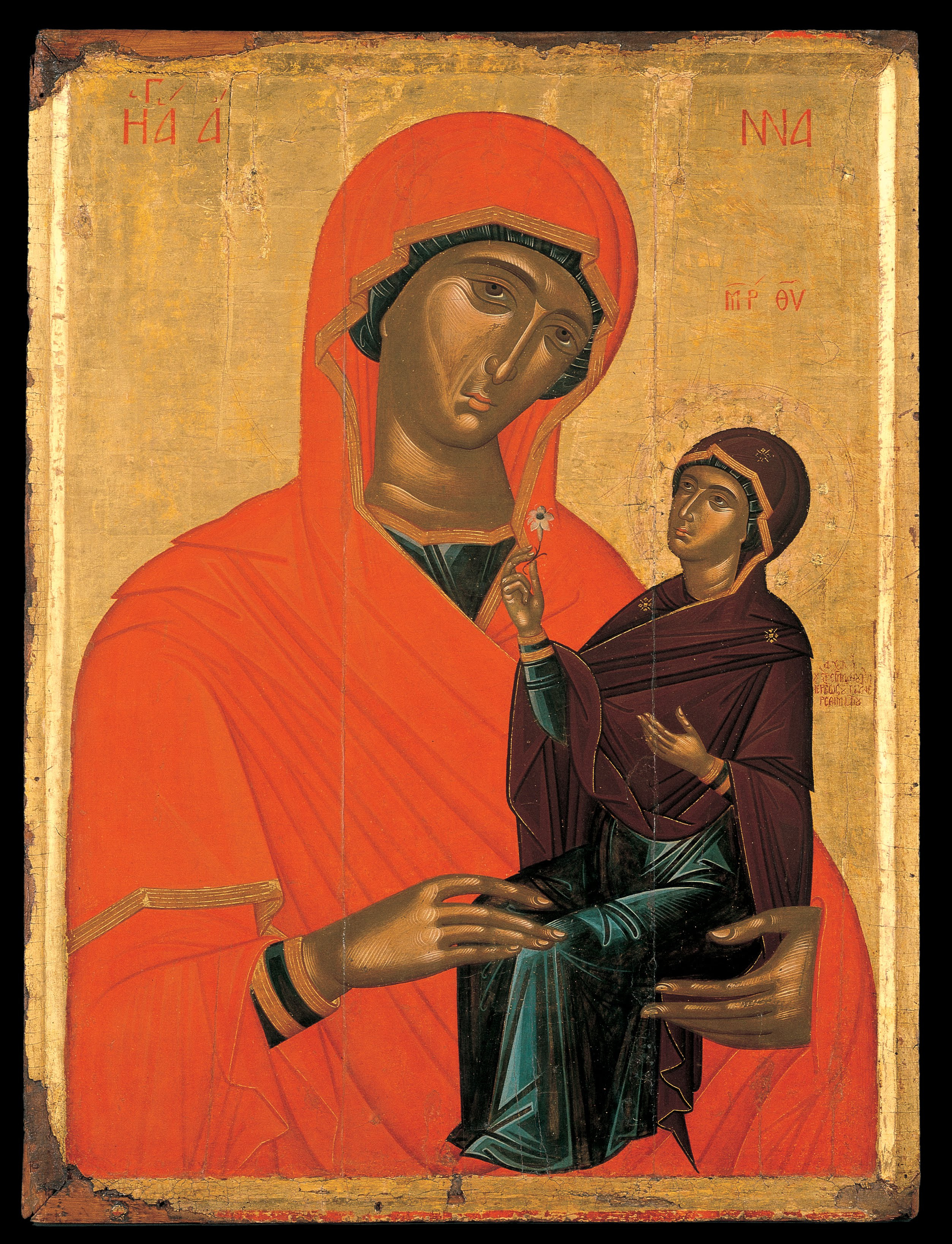
- Greek icon of Saint Anne with the Virgin, by Angelos Akotantos (c. 1420–1450)

Mother of the Virgin, Maternal Heroine Woman of Amram
- Born: Before c. 49 BC; Bethlehem, Hasmonean Judea
- Died: After c. 4 AD
- Venerated in: Catholic Church; Eastern Orthodox Church; Oriental Orthodox Church; Anglican Communion; Lutheranism; Islam; Afro-American religions
- Canonized: Pre-Congregation
- Major shrine: Apt Cathedral, Basilica of Sainte-Anne d'Auray, Basilica of Sainte-Anne-de-Beaupré
- Feast: Catholic Church: 26 July; Eastern Orthodox Church: 9 September 25 July
- Attributes: Book; door; with Mary, Jesus or Joachim; woman dressed in red or green
- Patronage: Mothers; grandparents; pregnant women; children; unmarried people; teachers; carpenters; child care providers; seamstresses; lacemakers; secondhand-clothes dealers; equestrians; stablemen; miners; lost things; loving homes; poverty; sterility; Brittany; Canada; Detroit; Taguig; Triana, Seville; Santa Ana, Pampanga; Hagonoy, Bulacan; Barili, Cebu; Molo, Iloilo City; Kurunegala Catholic Diocese, Sri Lanka; Fasnia, Tenerife; Mainar; Marsaskala; Carmelites

According to Christian tradition, Saint Anne (also known as Ann or Anna) was the mother of Mary, the wife of Joachim and the maternal grandmother of Jesus. Mary's mother is not named in the Bible's canonical gospels. In writing, Anne's name and that of her husband Joachim come from New Testament apocrypha, of which the Gospel of James (written perhaps around 150 AD) seems to be the earliest that mentions them. The mother of Mary is mentioned but not named in the Quran.

== Christian tradition ==
The story is similar to that of Samuel, whose mother Hannah (Hebrew: חַנָּה Ḥannāh "favour, grace"; the name Anne is derived from Hannah) had also been childless. The Immaculate Conception was eventually made dogma by the Catholic Church following an increased devotion to Anne in the twelfth century. Dedications to Anne in Eastern Christianity occur as early as the sixth century. In the Eastern Orthodox tradition, Anne and Joachim are ascribed the title Ancestors of God, and both the Nativity of Mary and the Presentation of Mary (in the Temple) are celebrated as two of the twelve Great Feasts of the Orthodox Church. The Dormition of Anne is also a minor feast in Eastern Christianity. In Lutheran Protestantism, it is held that Martin Luther chose to enter religious life as an Augustinian friar after invoking St. Anne while endangered by lightning.

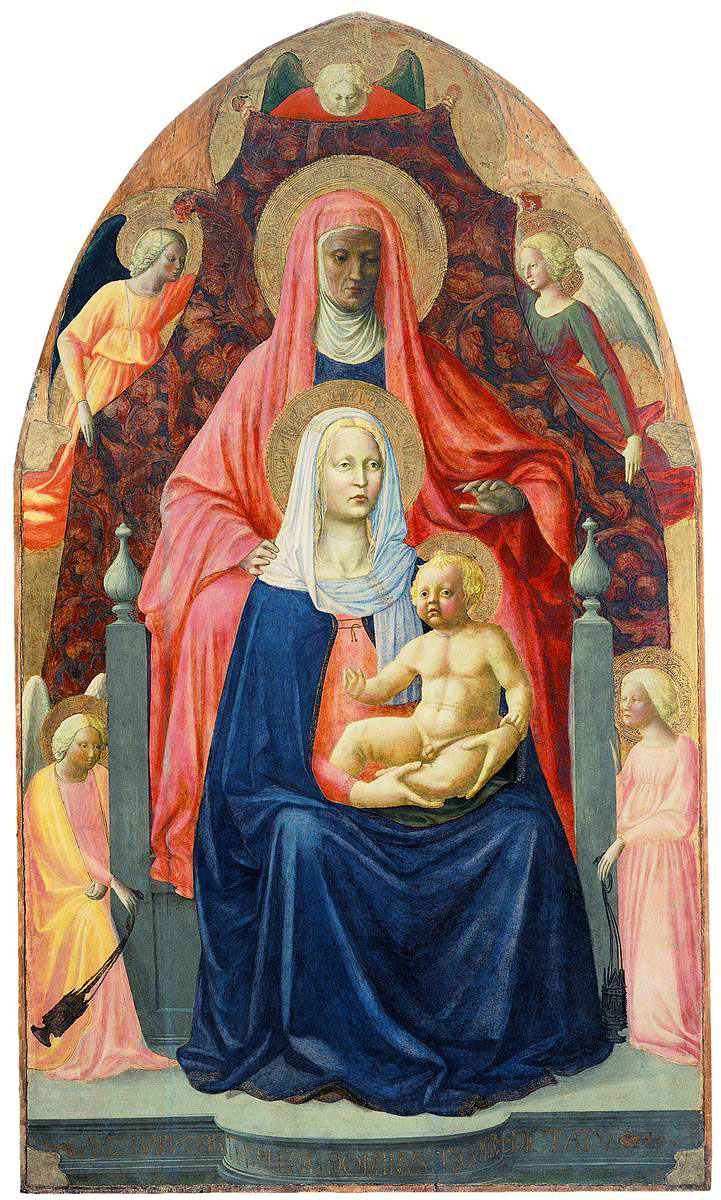
Masolino and Masaccio, Virgin and Child with Saint Anne (c. 1424), Uffizi, Florence

== Beliefs ==
Although the canonical books of the New Testament never mention the mother of the Virgin Mary, traditions about her family, childhood, education, and eventual betrothal to Joseph developed very early in the history of the church. The oldest and most influential source for these is the apocryphal Gospel of James, first written in Koine Greek around the middle of the second century AD. In the West, the Gospel of James fell under a cloud in the fourth and fifth centuries when it was accused of "absurdities" by Jerome and condemned as untrustworthy by Pope Damasus I, Pope Innocent I, and Pope Gelasius I. However, despite having been condemned by the Church, it was taken over almost in toto by another apocryphal work, the Gospel of Pseudo-Matthew, which popularised most of its stories.

Ancient belief, attested to by a sermon of John of Damascus, was that Anne married once. The sister of Saint Anne was Sobe, mother of Elizabeth. In the fifteenth century, the Catholic cleric Johann Eck related in a sermon that St Anne's parents were named Stollanus and Emerentia. Frederick George Holweck, writing in the Catholic Encyclopedia (1907) regards this genealogy as spurious.

In the 4th century and then much later in the fifteenth century, a belief arose that Mary was conceived of Anne without original sin. This belief in the Immaculate Conception states that God preserved Mary's body and soul intact and sinless from her first moment of existence, through the merits of Jesus Christ. The Immaculate Conception, often confused with the Annunciation of the Incarnation (Mary's virgin birth of Jesus), was defined dogma in the Catholic church by Pope Pius IX's papal bull, Ineffabilis Deus, in 1854. The 13th century Speculum Maius of Vincent of Beauvais incorporates information regarding the life of Saint Anne from an earlier work by Hrotsvitha of Gandersheim Abbey.

== Veneration ==
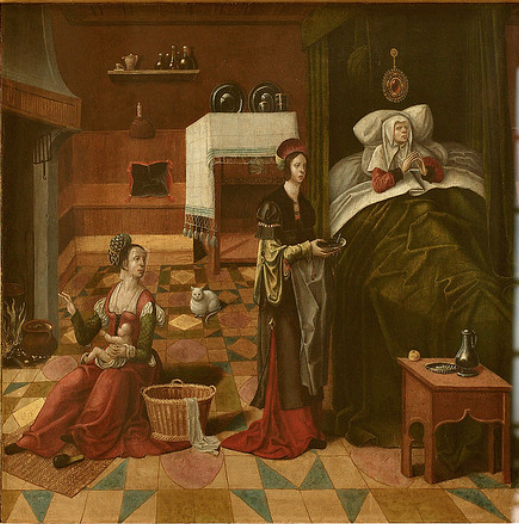
Birth of St. Anne, by Adriaen van Overbeke (c. 1521–1525)

In the Eastern church, the veneration of Anne herself may go back as far as c. 550, when Justinian built a church in Constantinople in her honour. The earliest pictorial sign of her veneration in the West is an eighth-century fresco in the church of Santa Maria Antiqua, Rome. The Feast of the Conception of the Virgin Mary had reached southern Italy by the ninth century. In the Latin Church St. Anne was not venerated, except, perhaps, in the south of France, before the thirteenth century. A shrine at Douai, in northern France, was one of the early centres of devotion to St. Anne in the West.

The Anna Selbdritt was a type of iconography depicting the three generations of Saint Anne, Mary, and the child Jesus. Emphasizing the humanity of Jesus, it drew on the earlier conventions of the Seat of Wisdom, and was popular in northern Germany in the 1500s. During the High Middle Ages, Saint Anne became increasingly identified as a maritime saint, protecting sailors and fisherman, and invoked against storms.

Two well-known shrines to St. Anne are that of Ste-Anne-d'Auray in Brittany, France; and that of Ste-Anne-de-Beaupré near the city of Québec. The number of visitors to the Basilica of Ste-Anne-de-Beaupré is greatest on St Anne's Feast Day, 26 July, and the Sunday before the Nativity of the Virgin Mary, 8 September. In 1892, Pope Leo XIII sent a relic of St Anne to the church.

In the Maltese language, the Milky Way galaxy is called It-Triq ta' Sant'Anna, literally "The Way of St. Anne". In the United States, the Daughters of the Holy Spirit named the former Annhurst College in her honor.

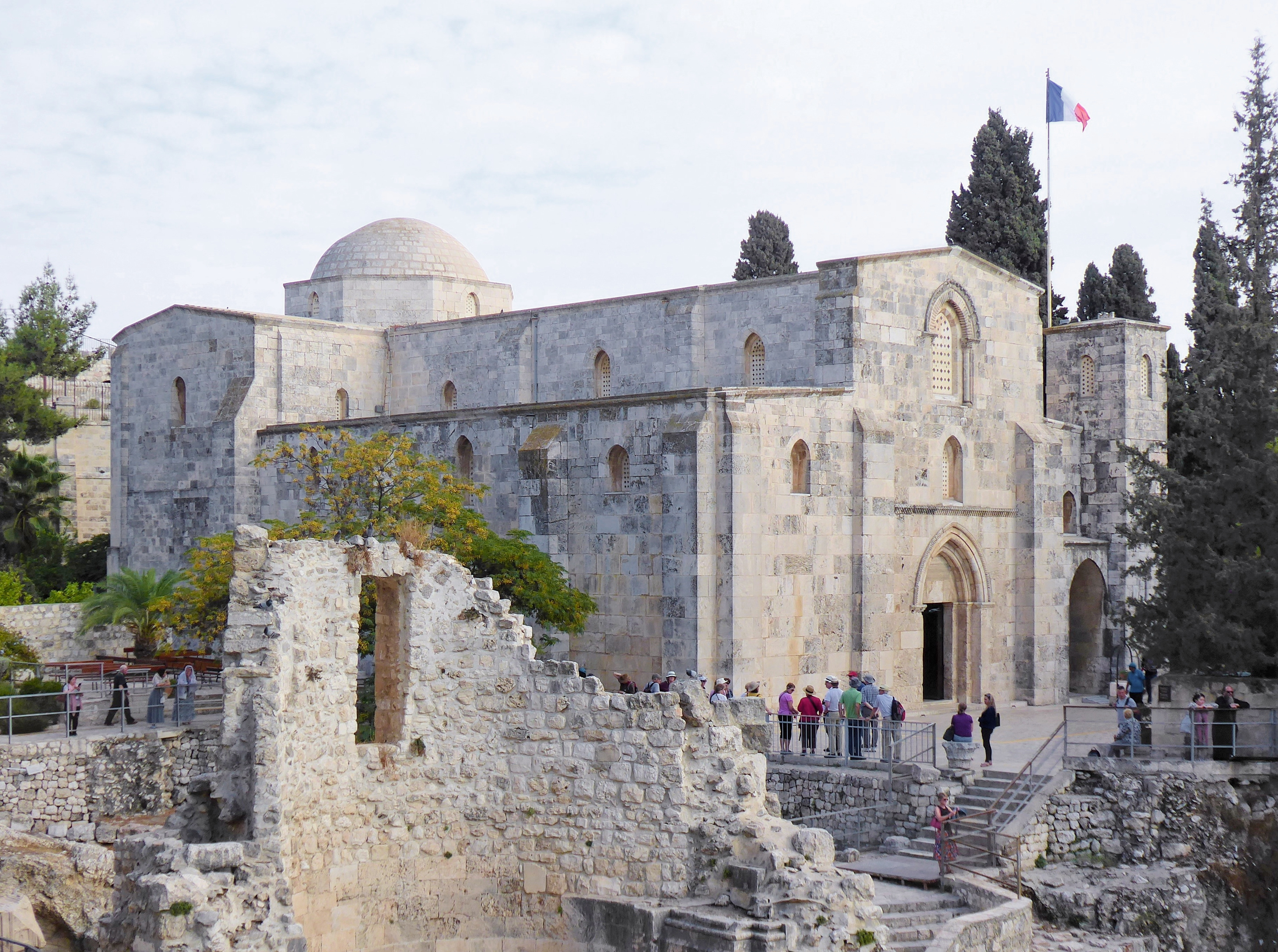
Church of St. Anne in Jerusalem, c. 1140

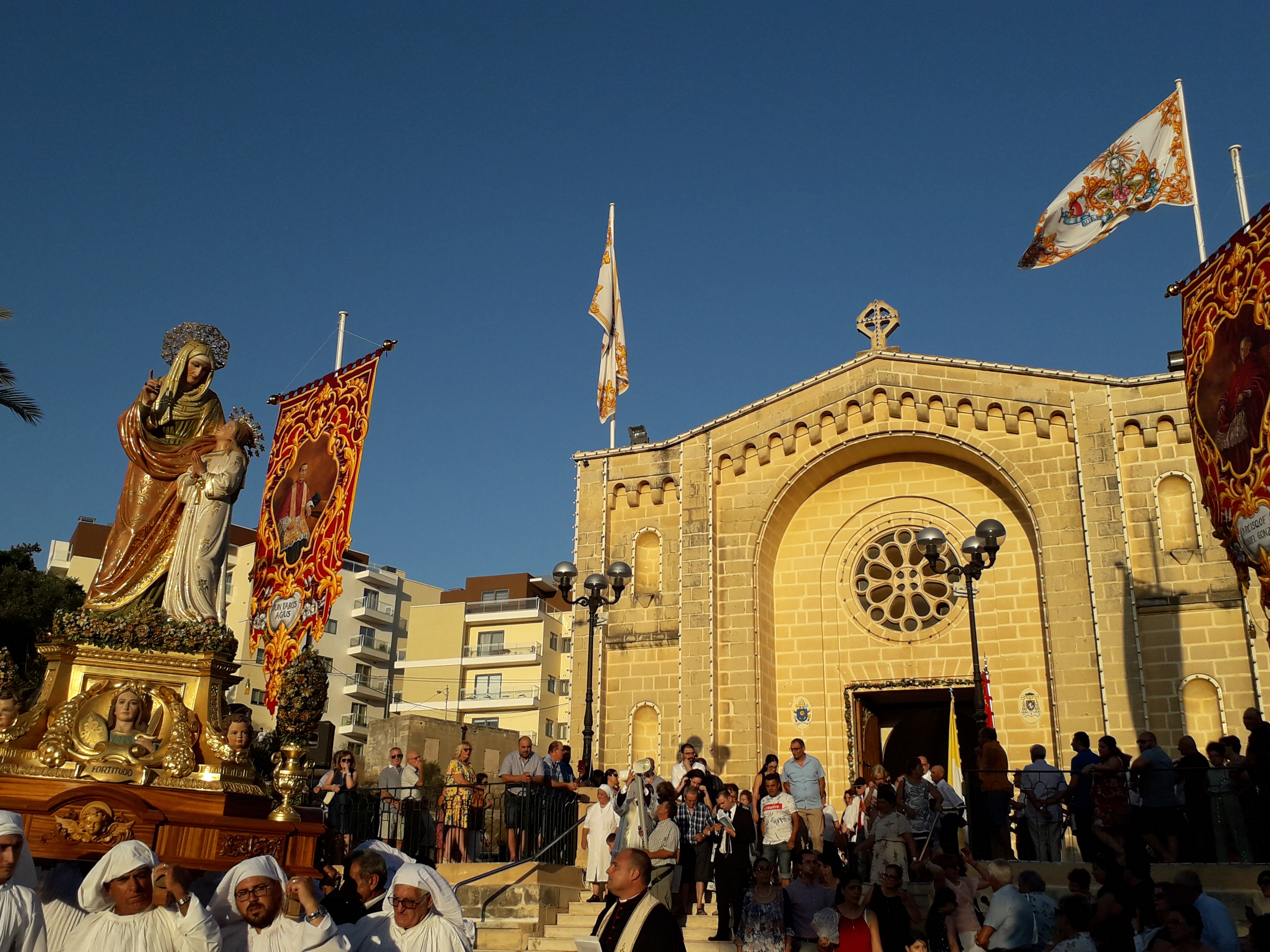
Feast of Saint Anne in Marsaskala Parish Church, Malta

== Commemoration ==
By the middle of the 7th century, a distinct feast day, the Conception of St. Anne (Maternity of Holy Anna) celebrating the conception of Mary by Saint Anne, was observed at the Monastery of Saint Sabas. It is now known in the Greek Orthodox Church as the feast of "The Conception by St. Anne of the Most Holy Theotokos", and celebrated on 9 December. In the Catholic Church, the Feast of Saints Anne and Joachim is celebrated on 26 July.

=== Feast Day ===
==== Catholic Church ====
- 26 July

==== Eastern Orthodox Church ====
- 25 July: (Dormition of the Righteous Anna, the Mother of the Most Holy Theotokos)
- 9 September: (Holy and Righteous Ancestors of God, Joachim and Anna, Afterfeast of the Nativity of the Mother of God)
- 9 December (The Conception by Righteous Anna of the Most Holy Mother of God)

==== Anglican Communion ====
- 26 July: Anne is remembered (with Joachim) in the Church of England with a Lesser Festival on 26 July.

==== Lutheranism ====
- 26 July

==== Coptic Orthodox Church and Ethiopian Orthodox Tewahedo Church ====
- 7 November (The Departure of St. Anna (Hannah), the mother of the Theotokos)

==== Armenian Apostolic Church ====
- 9 December (The Conception by Righteous Anna of the Most Holy Mother of God)
- Tuesday, 2nd week after Dormition of the Mother of God (with Joachim)

==== Syro-Malabar Church ====
- 26 July (Anne and Joachim)

==== Syro-Malankara Catholic Church ====
- 9 September (Mar Joachim and Martha Anna)

==== Maronite Church ====
- 9 September (St. Anne and Joachim, Parents of the Blessed Virgin Mary)

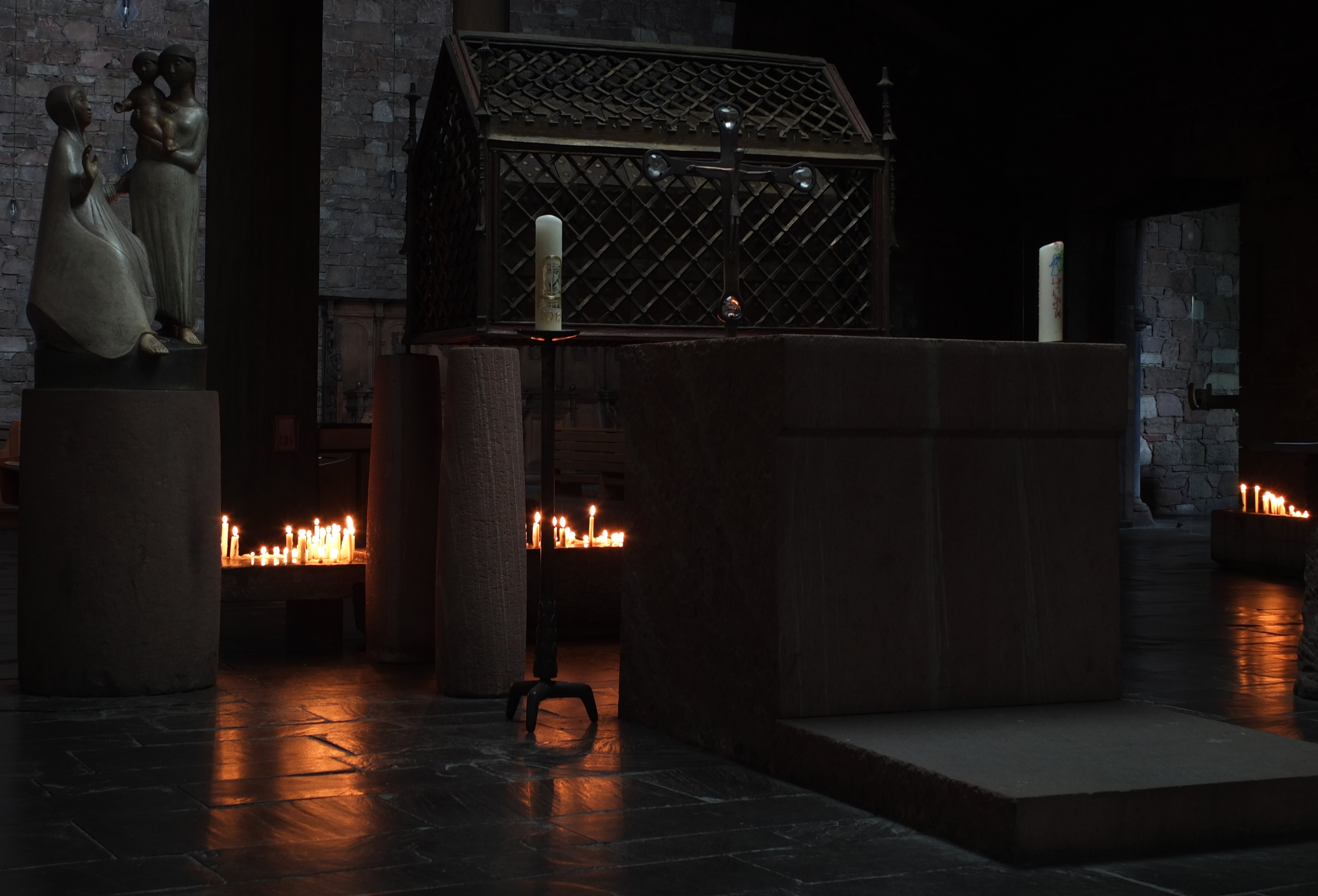
St. Anne's Shrine, with the reliquary of her skull, Annakirche, Düren

=== Relics ===
The alleged relics of St. Anne were brought from the Holy Land to Constantinople in 710 and were kept there in the church of St. Sophia as late as 1333. During the 12th and 13th centuries, returning crusaders and pilgrims from the East brought relics of Anne to a number of churches, including most famously those at Apt, in Provence, Ghent, and Chartres. St. Anne's relics have been preserved and venerated in the many cathedrals and monasteries dedicated to her name, for example in Austria, Canada, Germany, Italy, and Greece in the semi-autonomous Mount Athos, and the city of Katerini. Medieval and baroque craftsmanship is evidenced in, for example, the metalwork of the life-size reliquaries containing the bones of her forearm. Examples employing folk art techniques are also known. Düren has been the main place of pilgrimage for Anne since 1506, when Pope Julius II decreed that her relics should be kept there, after they were stolen from the church of St. Stephen in Mainz.

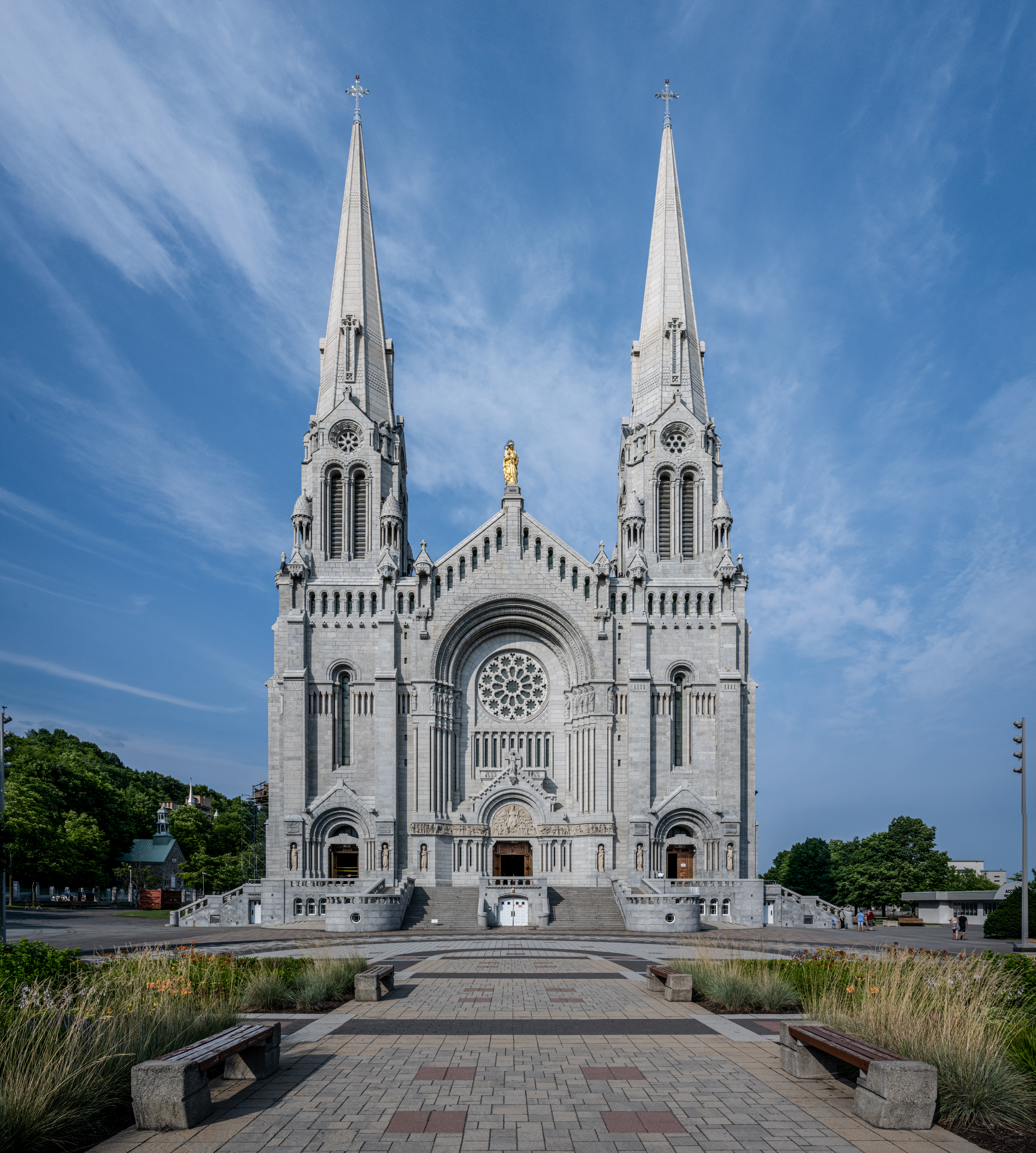
Basilica of Sainte-Anne-de-Beaupré, Quebec, Canada

== Patronage ==
The Church of Saint Anne in Beit Guvrin National Park was built by the Byzantines and the Crusaders in the 12th century, known in Arabic as Khirbet (lit. 'ruin') Sandahanna, the mound of Maresha being called Tell Sandahanna. Saint Anne is the patroness of unmarried women, housewives, women in labour or who want to be pregnant, grandmothers, mothers and educators. She is also a patroness of horseback riders, cabinet-makers and miners. As the mother of Mary, this devotion to Saint Anne as the patron of miners arises from the medieval comparison between Mary and Christ and the precious metals silver and gold. Anne's womb was considered the source from which these precious metals were mined.

Saint Anne is the patron saint of Anápolis, Cavalcante, Inhumas, Posse, Uruaçu and the state of Goiás (Goiás, Brazil), Anahy, Castro, Laranjeiras do Sul, Paulo Frontin, Pitanga, Ponta Grossa, Santana do Itararé (Paraná, Brazil), Analândia, Areias, Botucatu, Herculândia, Iporanga, Ipuã, Itapeva, Itapirapuã Paulista, Mogi das Cruzes, Pedreira, Pedro de Toledo, Roseira, Santana da Ponte Pensa, Santana de Parnaíba, Sumaré, Trabiju, Vargem Grande do Sul, Vinhedo (São Paulo, Brazil), the Mi'kmaq people, Quebec (Canada), Cuenca (Ecuador), Santa Ana, Jucuarán (El Salvador), Brittany (France), Staufen im Breisgau (Germany),, Garadna (Hungary), Castelbuono (Italy), Bukit Mertajam, Port Klang (Malaysia), Marsaskala (Malta), Chinandega (Nicaragua), Town of Sta Ana Province of Pampanga, Molo, Iloilo City, Balasan, Iloilo, Hagonoy, Santa Ana, Taguig City, Saint Anne Shrine, Malicboy, Pagbilao, Quezon and Malinao, Albay (Philippines), Adjuntas (Puerto Rico), Sainte Anne Island, Baie Sainte Anne and Praslin Island (Seychelles), Kľúčové (Slovakia), Kishegyes (Serbia) Chiclana de la Frontera, Tudela, Atarfe and Fasnia (Spain), Santa Ana (California), Norwich (Connecticut), Saint Anne (Illinois), Detroit (Michigan), Berlin (New Hampshire), Santa Ana Pueblo, Seama, Taos (New Mexico), and South Vietnam. The parish church of Vatican City is Sant'Anna dei Palafrenieri. There is a shrine dedicated to Saint Anne in the Woods in Bristol, United Kingdom.

== In art ==
=== Iconography ===
The subject of Joachim and Anne The Meeting at the Golden Gate was a regular component of artistic cycles of the Life of the Virgin. The couple meet at the Golden Gate of Jerusalem and embrace. They are aware of Anne's pregnancy, of which they have been separately informed by an archangel. This moment stood for the conception of Mary, and the feast was celebrated on the same day as the Immaculate Conception. Artworks representing the Golden Gate and the events leading up to it were influenced by the narrative in the widely read Golden Legend of Jacobus de Voragine. The Birth of Mary, the Presentation of Mary and the Marriage of the Virgin were usual components of cycles of the Life of the Virgin in which Anne is normally shown here. Her emblem is a door. She is often portrayed wearing red and green, representing love and life.

Anne is never shown as present at the Nativity of Christ but is frequently shown with the infant Christ in various subjects. She is sometimes believed to be depicted in scenes of the Presentation of Jesus at the Temple and the Circumcision of Christ, but in the former case, this likely reflects a misidentification through confusion with Anna the Prophetess. There was a tradition that Anne went (separately) to Egypt and rejoined the Holy Family after their Flight to Egypt. Anne is not seen with the adult Christ, so was regarded as having died during the youth of Jesus. Anne is also shown as the matriarch of the Holy Kinship, the extended family of Jesus, a popular subject in late medieval Germany; some versions of these pictorial and sculptural depictions include Emerentia who was reputed in the fifteenth century to be Anne's mother. In modern devotions, Anne and her husband are invoked for protection for the unborn.

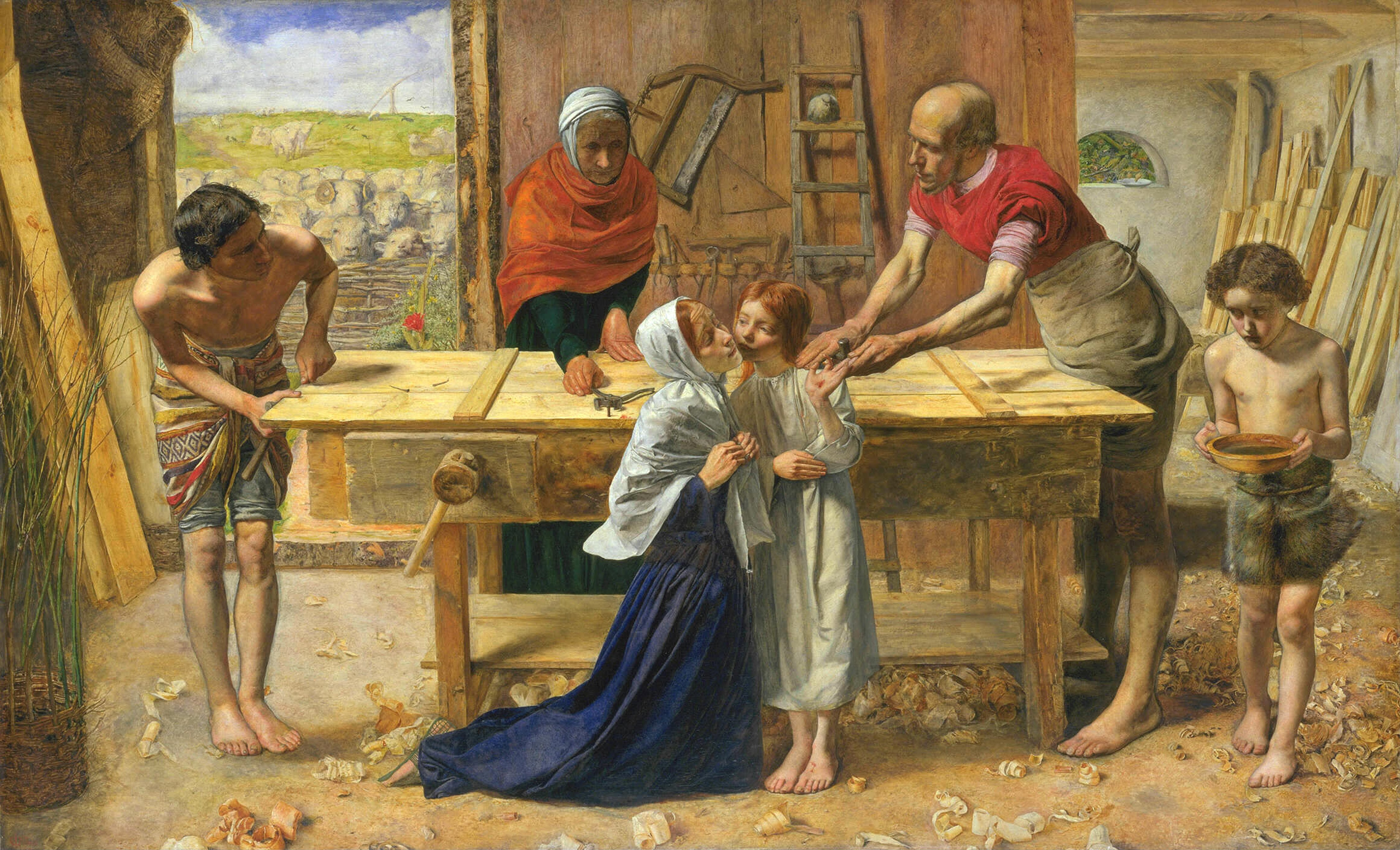
Christ in the House of His Parents by John Everett Millais, 1849–50

=== Virgin and Child with Saint Anne ===
The role of the Messiah's grandparents in salvation history was commonly depicted in early medieval devotional art in a vertical double-Madonna arrangement known as the Virgin and Child with Saint Anne, and developed into less hierarchical compositions. The painted or sculpted group is called in Italian Metterza, in French Sainte Anne trinitaire, and in German Anna selbdritt. Another typical subject has Anne teaching the Virgin Mary the scriptures.

=== Christ in the House of His Parents ===
In John Everett Millais's 1849–50 work, Christ in the House of His Parents, Anne is shown in her son-in-law Joseph's carpentry shop. Her daughter Mary, and Joseph are caring for a young Jesus who had cut his hand on a nail, prefiguring the wounds of his Crucifixion. The coeval John the Baptist carries a bowl of water to clean the injured hand of Jesus, also prefiguring the Baptism of Jesus.

== In Islam ==
Anne (Arabic: حنة بنت فاقوذ, romanized: Ḥannah bint Faḳūdh) is also revered in Islam, recognized as a highly spiritual woman and as the mother of Mary. She is not named in the Quran, where she is referred to as "the wife of Imran". The Quran describes her remaining childless until her old age. One day, Anne saw a bird feeding its young while sitting in the shade of a tree, which awakened her desire to have children of her own. She prayed for a child and eventually conceived; her husband, Imran, died before the child was born. Expecting the child to be male, Anne vowed to dedicate him to isolation and service in the Second Temple; (Note: "O my Lord! I do dedicate into Thee what is in my womb for Thy special service: So accept this of me: For Thou hearest and knowest all things." (Quran 3:35).) however, Anne bore a daughter instead, and named her Mary. Her words upon delivering Mary reflect her status as a great mystic, realising that while she had wanted a son, this daughter was God's gift to her:

When she delivered, she said, "My Lord! I have given birth to a girl," —and Allah fully knew what she had delivered—" and the male is not like the female. I have named her Mary, and I seek Your protection for her and her offspring from Satan, the accursed." So her Lord accepted her graciously and blessed her with a pleasant upbringing—entrusting her to the care of Zachariah...

— Surah Al Imran 3:36-37

== Gallery ==
Various depictions of Saint Anne

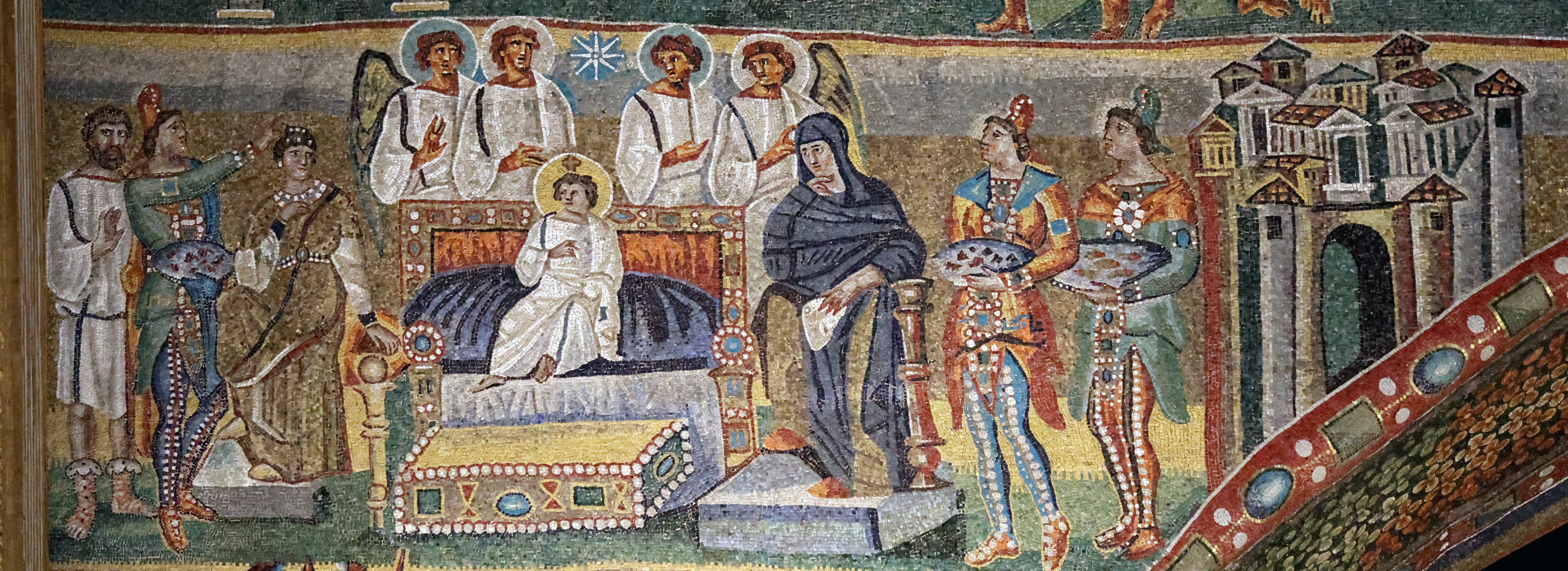
Adoration of the Magi, with (supposedly) St. Anne in the center (5th ct.), Santa Maria Maggiore, Rome

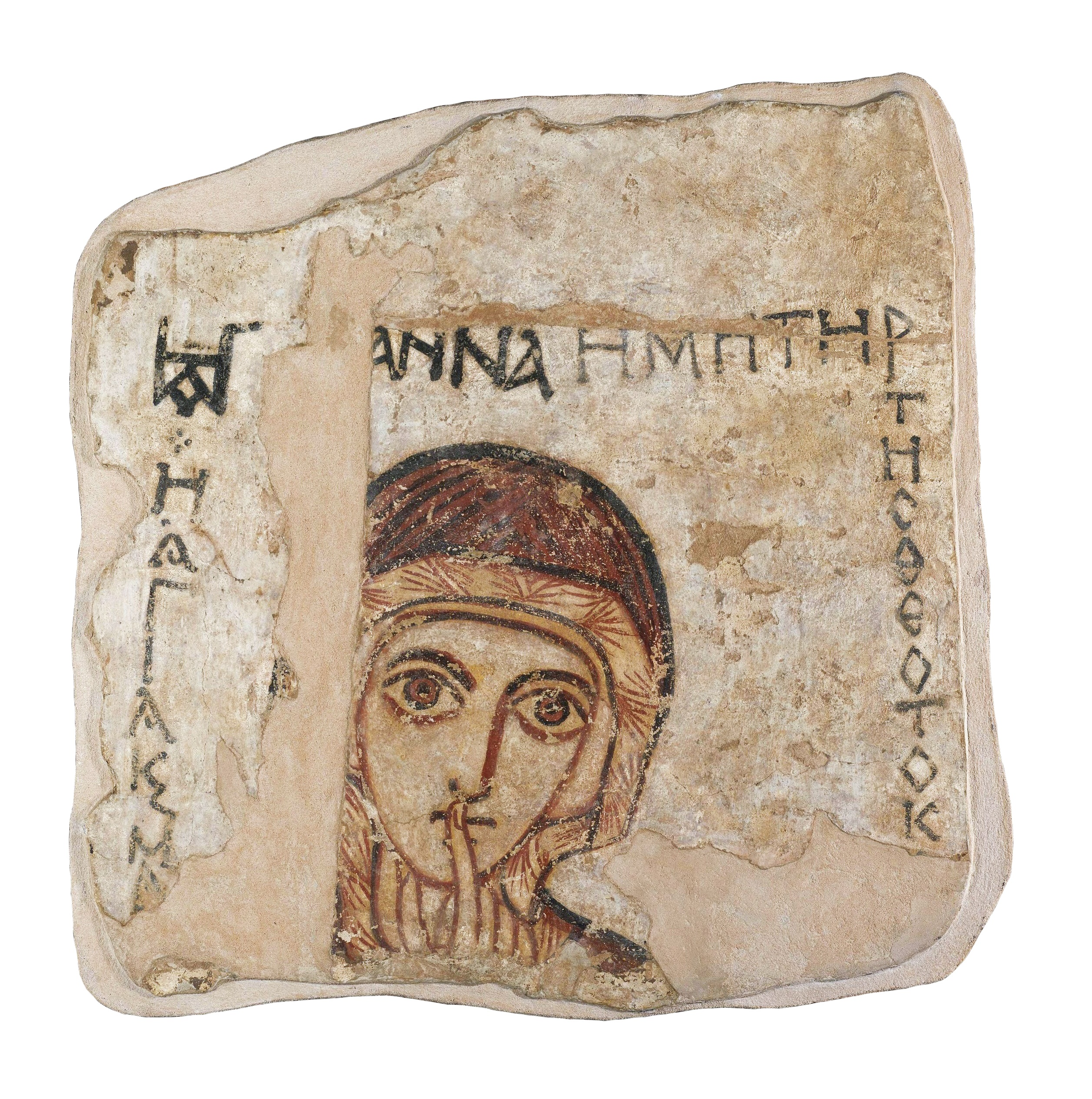
Coptic Saint Anne from Faras, Nubia (8th century), National Museum in Warsaw

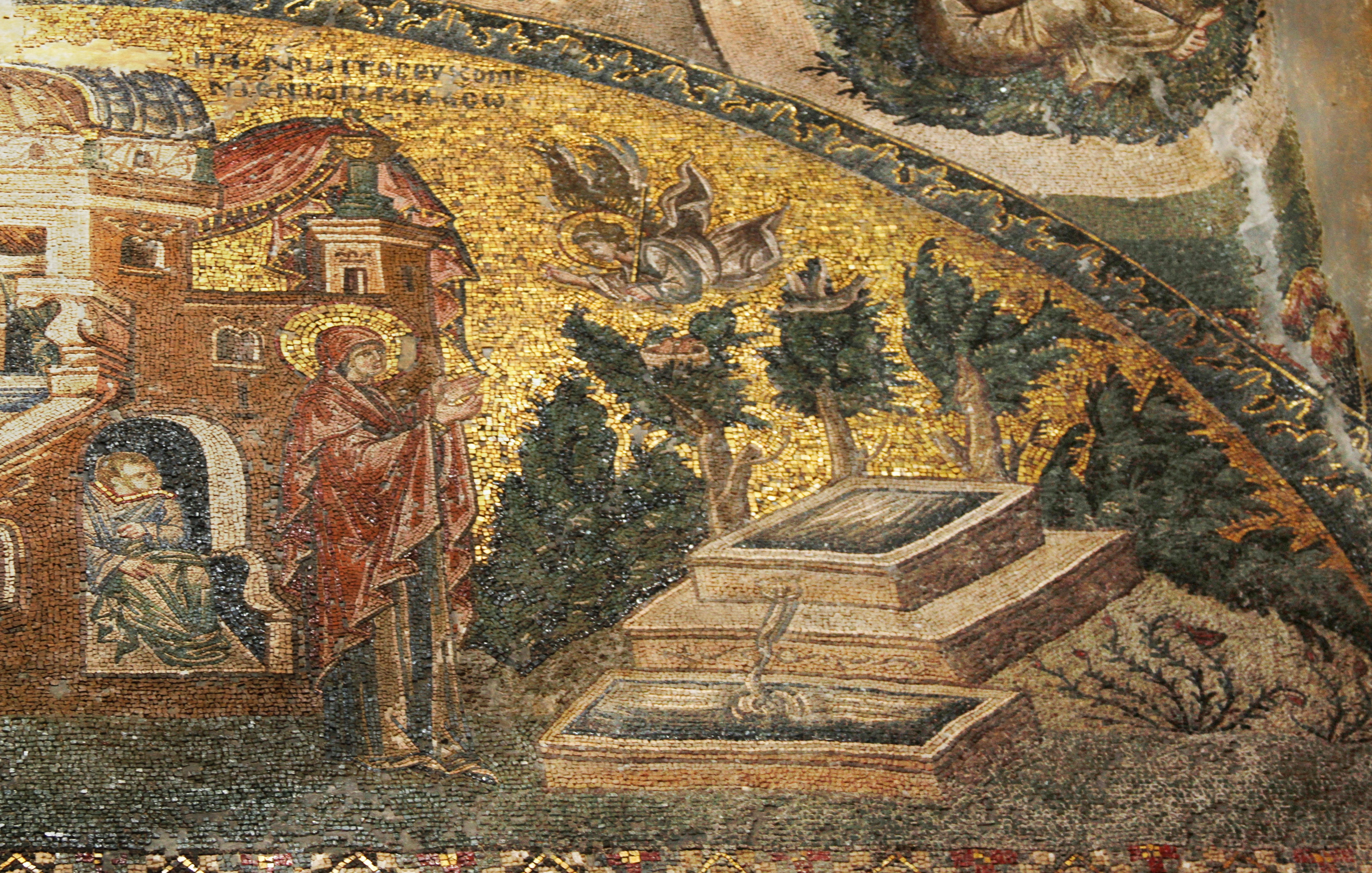
Annunciation to Anne, mosaic (11th ct), Chora Church, Istanbul

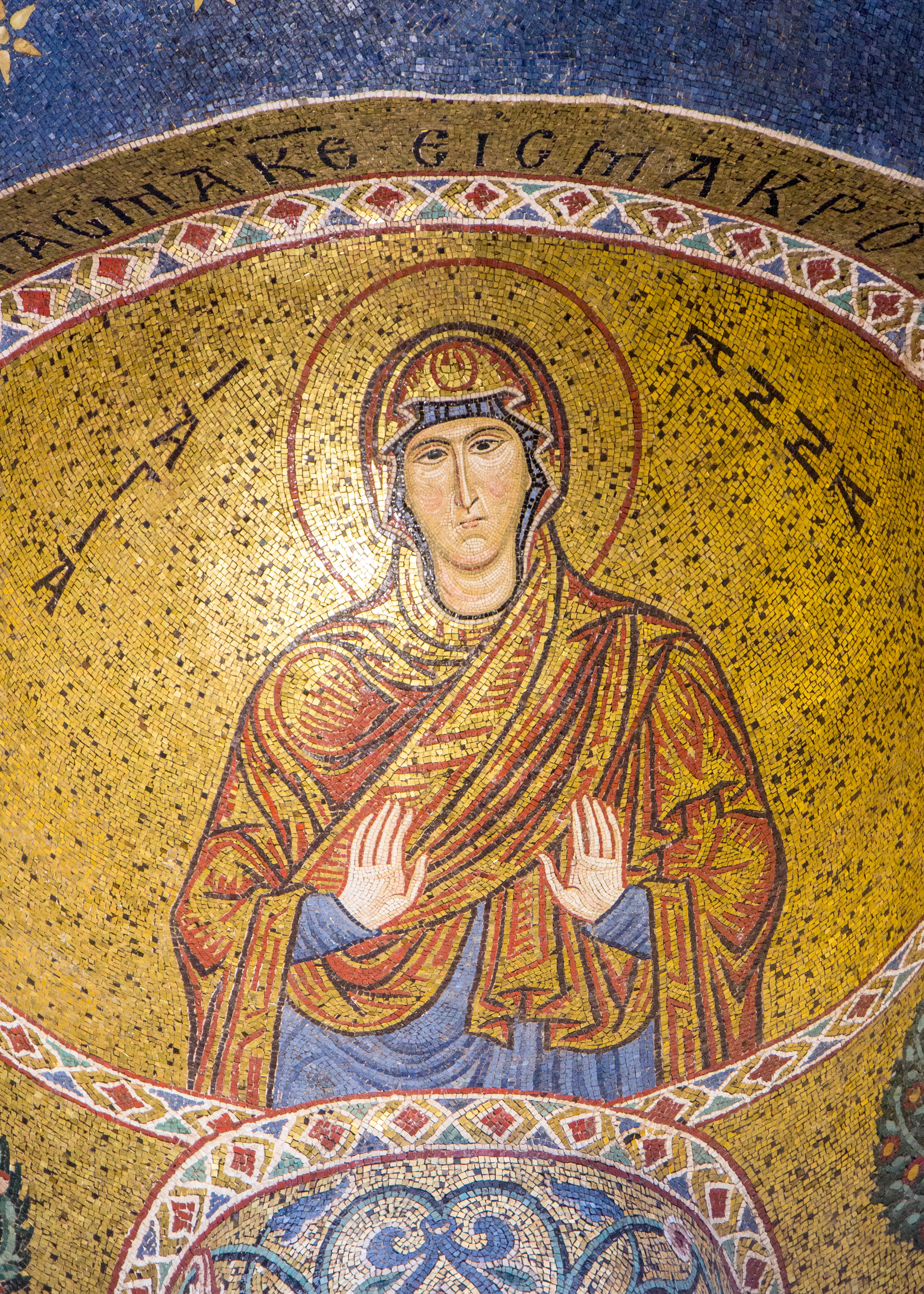
Eastern Orthodox church la Martorana (12th ct.), Palermo, Sicily

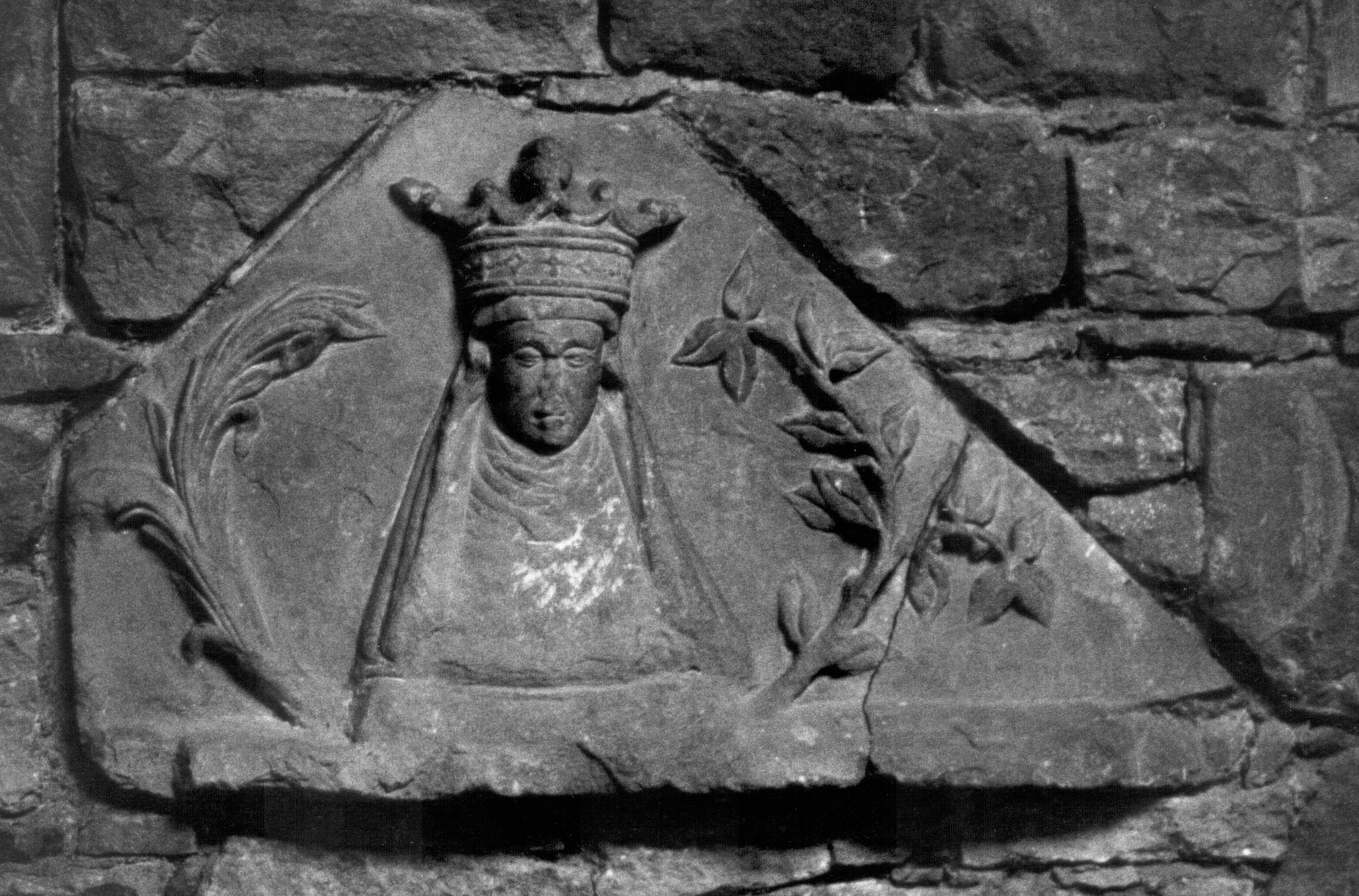
Late Gothic Relief bust of crowned St. Anne (as spolia in the rebuilt) Annakirche, Düren, Germany

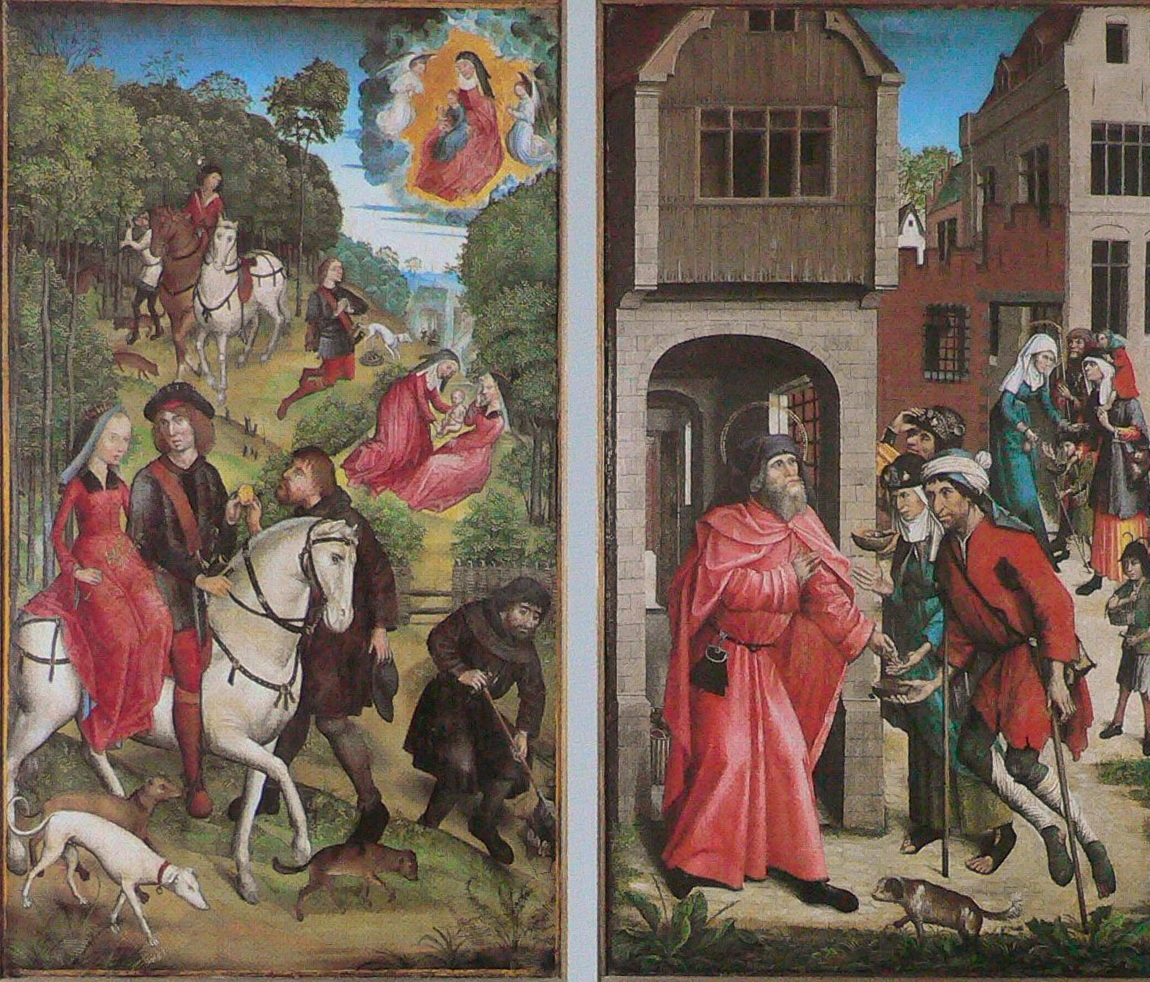
Legends of St. Anne (15th ct.), altar of St. Anne, cloister of the Carmelites, Frankfurt

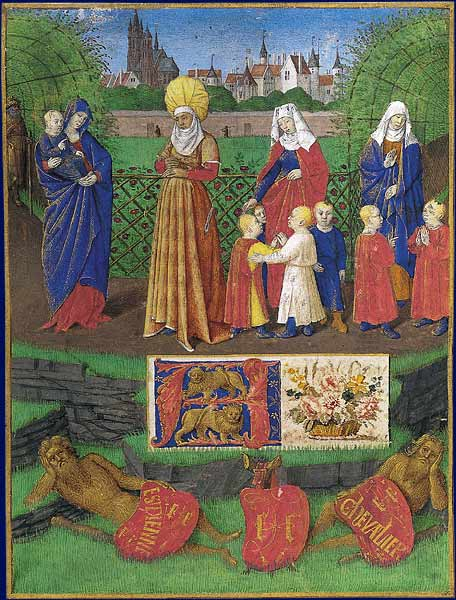
Saint Anne and the Three Marys, from Hours of Étienne Chevalier, illuminated by Jean Fouquet (late 15th ct.), Bibliothèque nationale de France, Paris

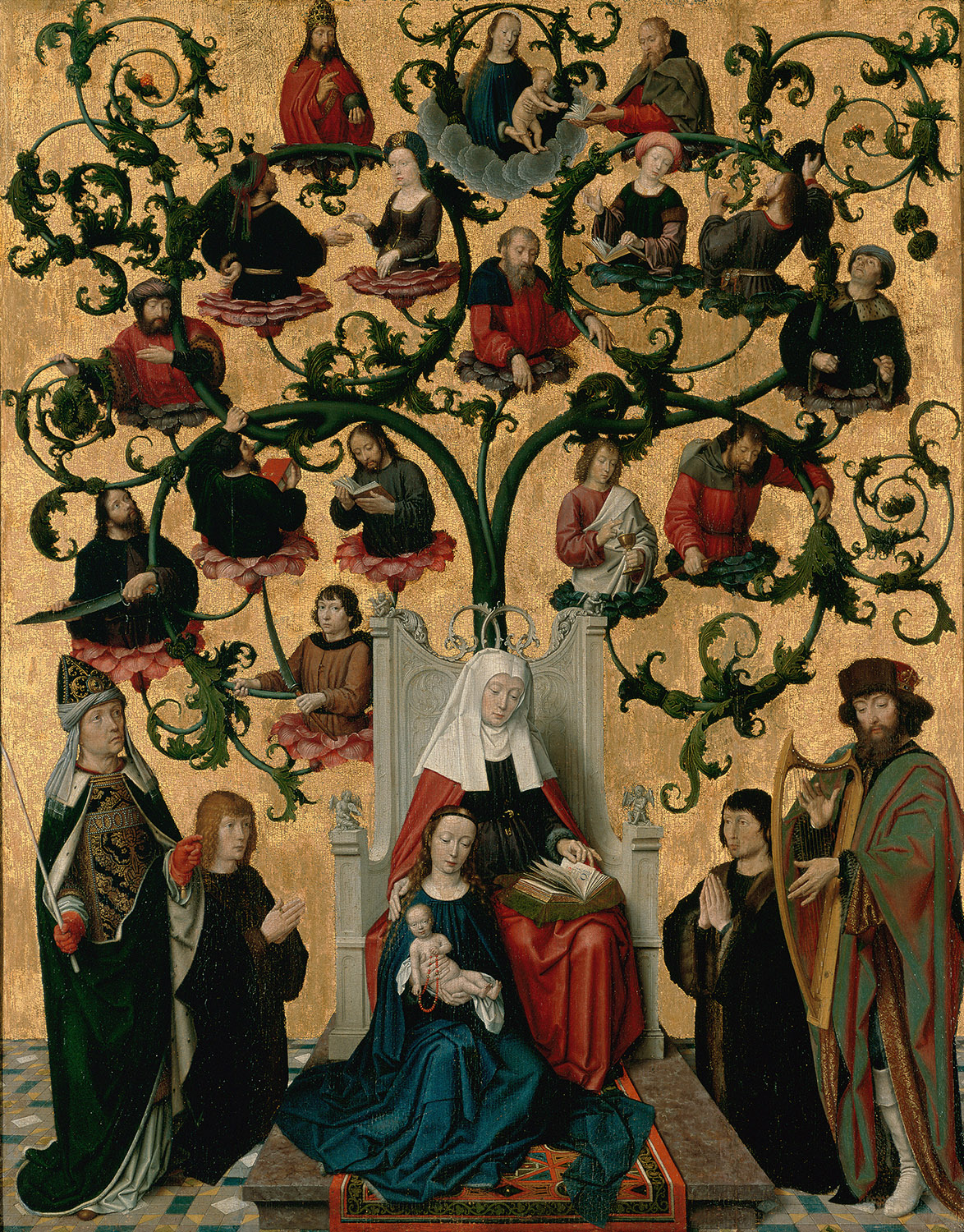
The Line of Saint Anne, Gérard David (c. 1500), Musée des Beaux-Arts de Lyon

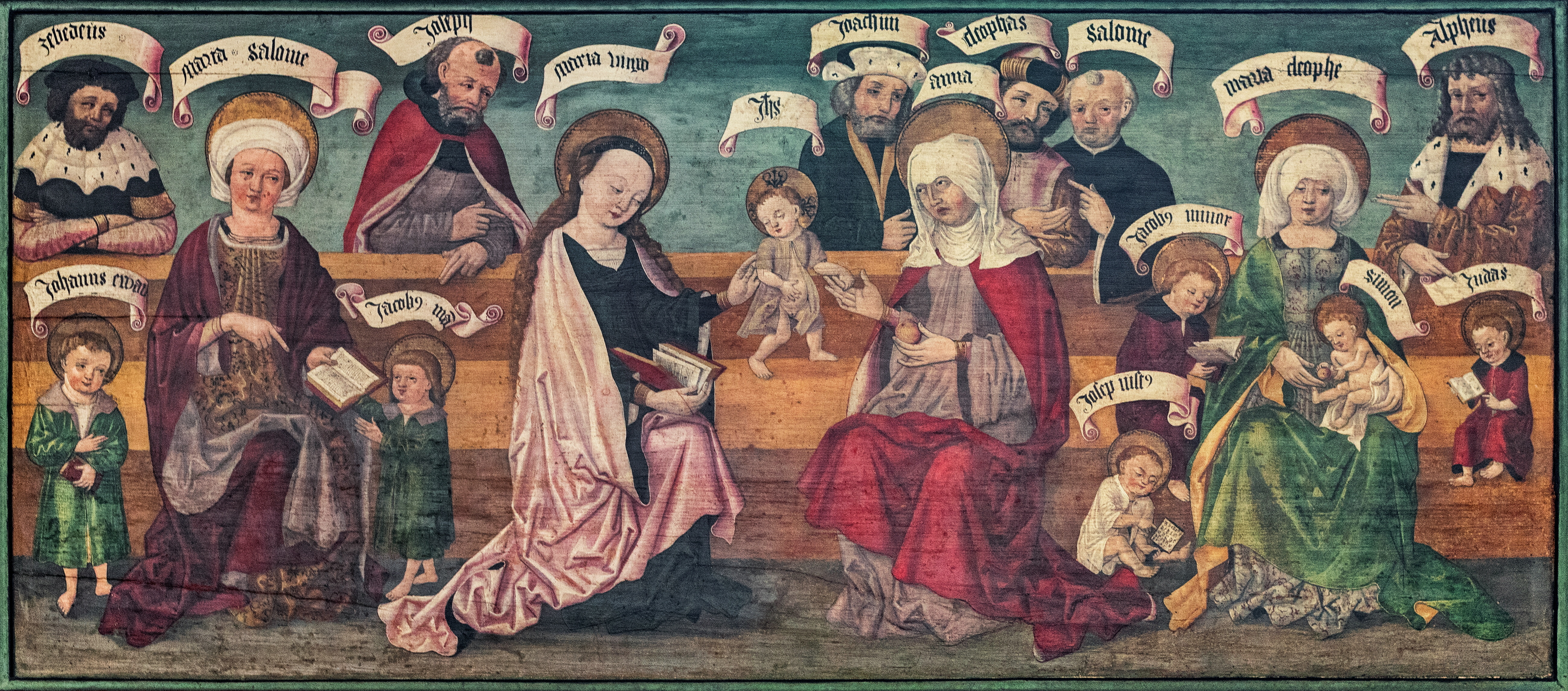
The Holy Kinship (early 16th ct.), Liebfrauenkirche Oberwesel, Germany

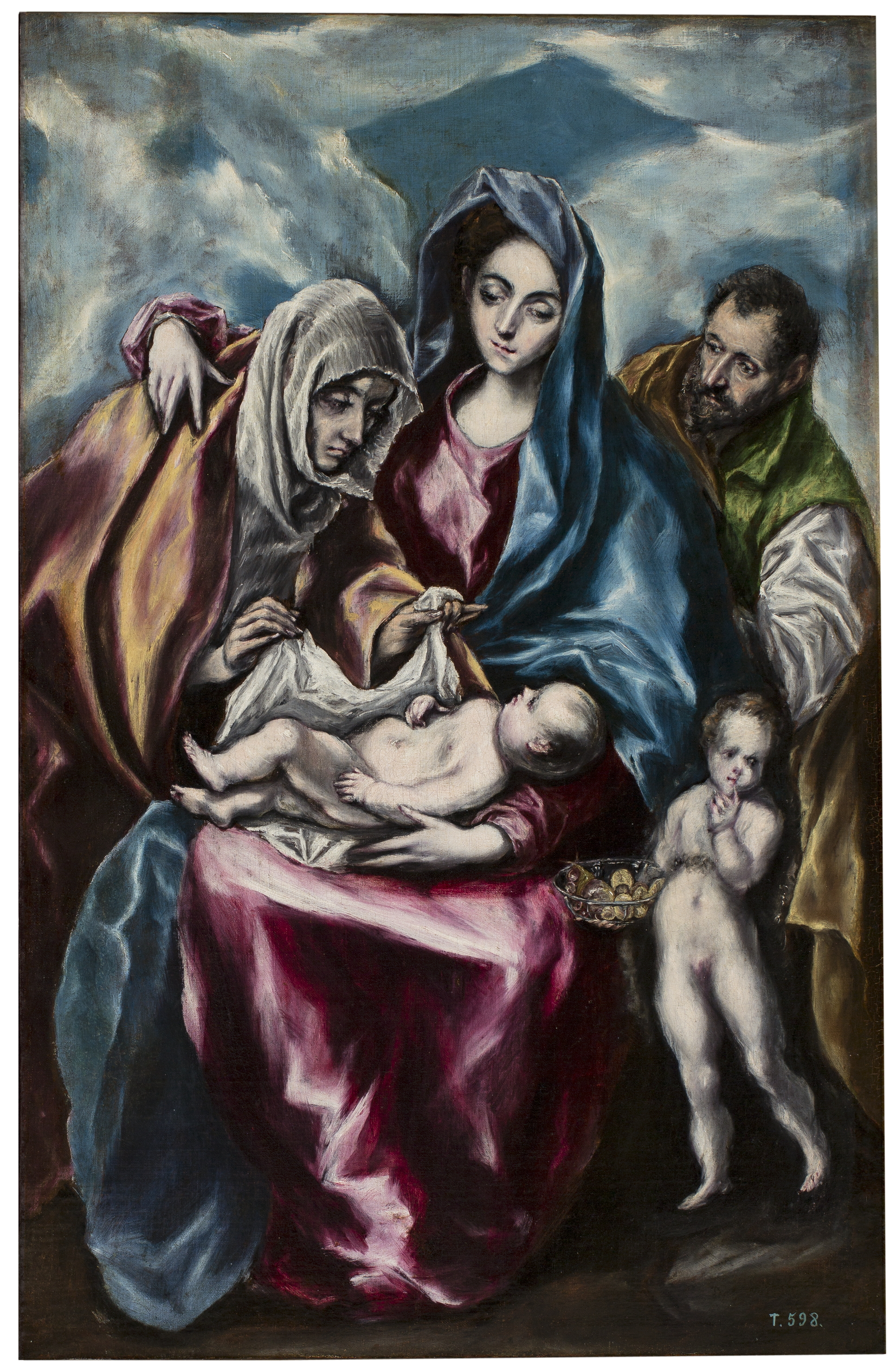
The Holy Family with St. Anne and St. John by El Greco (c. 1600), Biblioteca Museu Víctor Balaguer, Vilanova i la Geltrú (Barcelona)

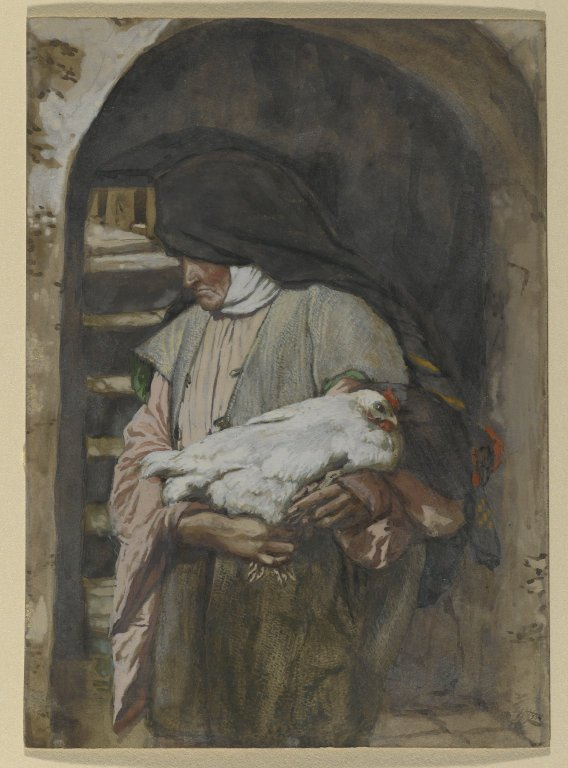
Saint Anne, James Tissot (late 19th ct.), Brooklyn Museum, New York
The Virgin and Child with Saint Anne

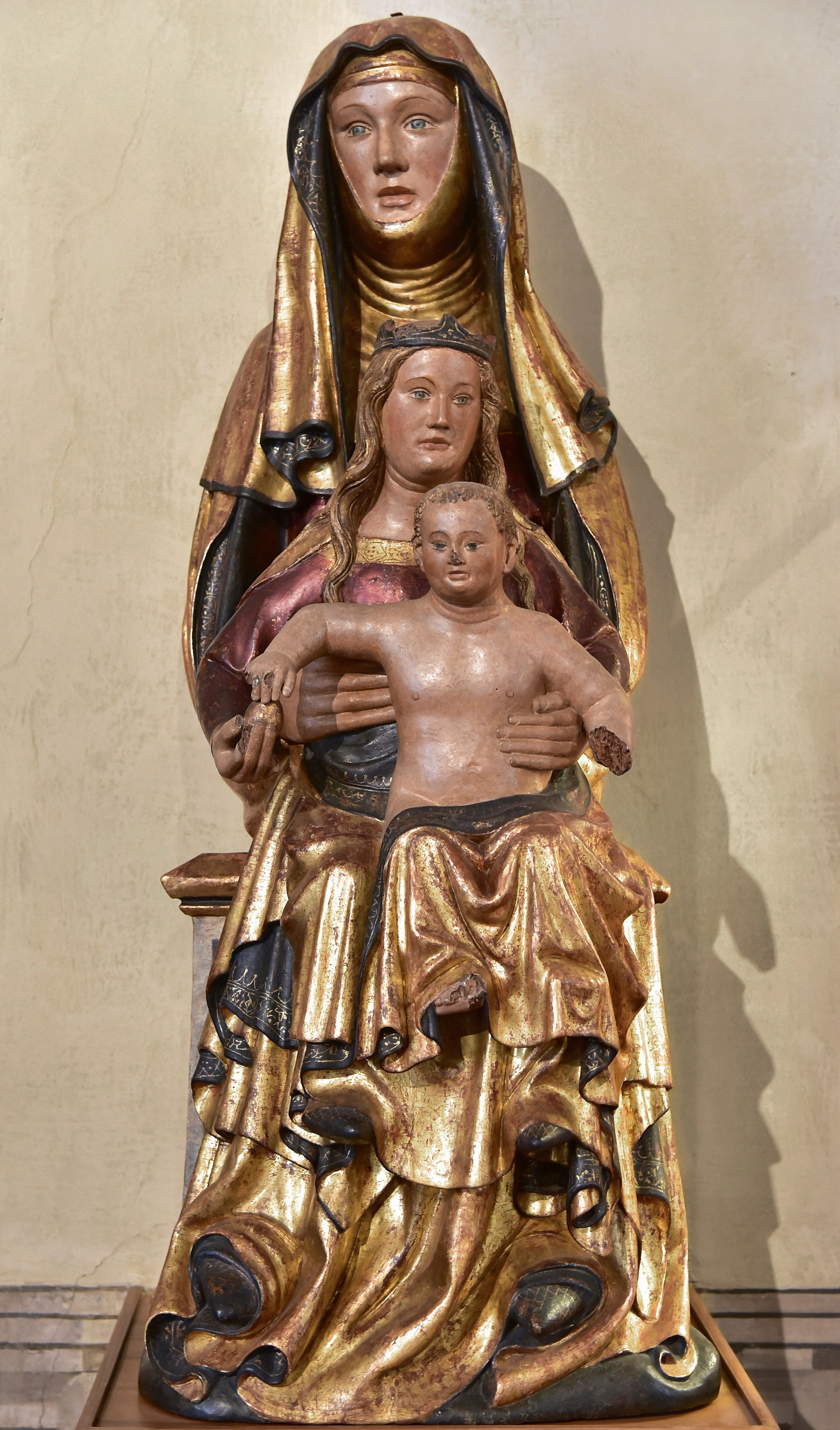
French polychromed wood sculpture (late 14th century), Bargello, Florence

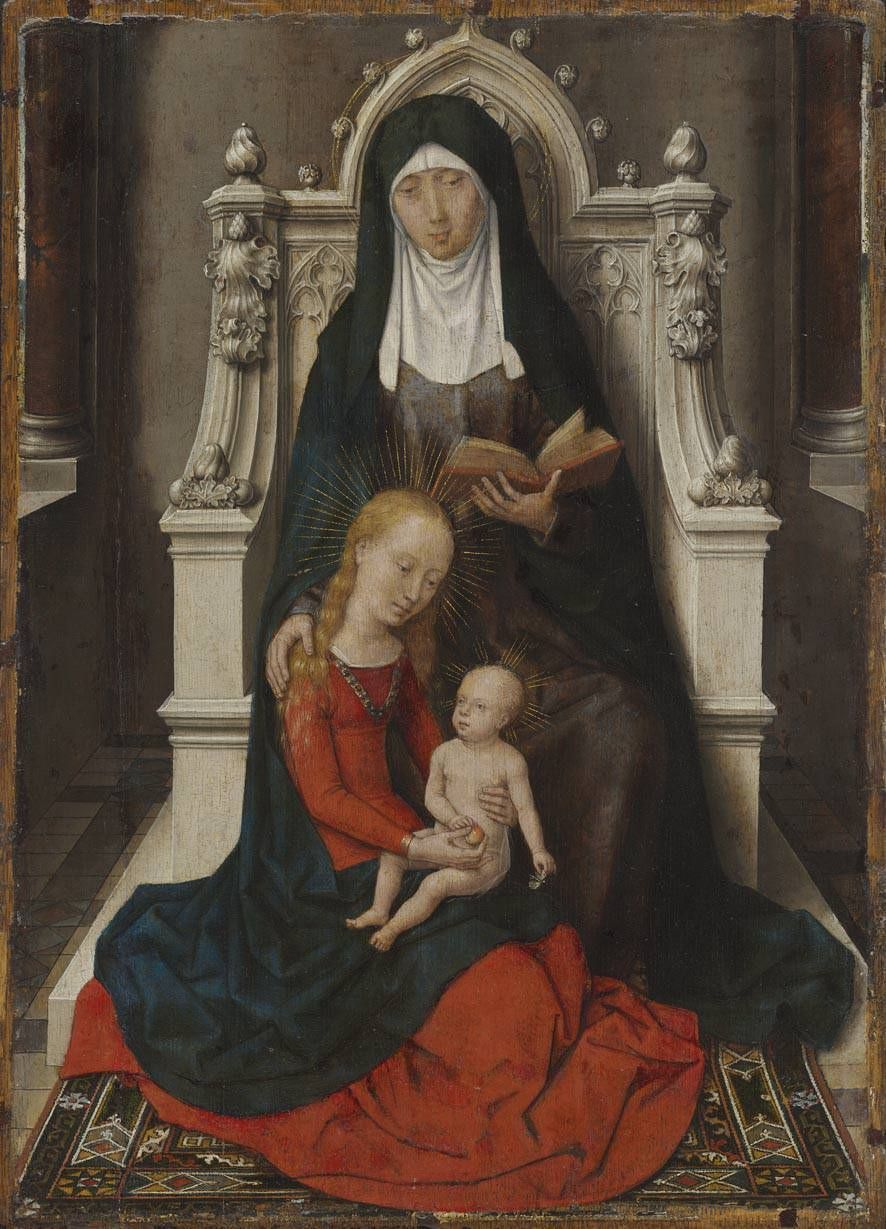
Hans Memling, reverse of Munich Diptych (1480), Alte Pinakothek, Munich

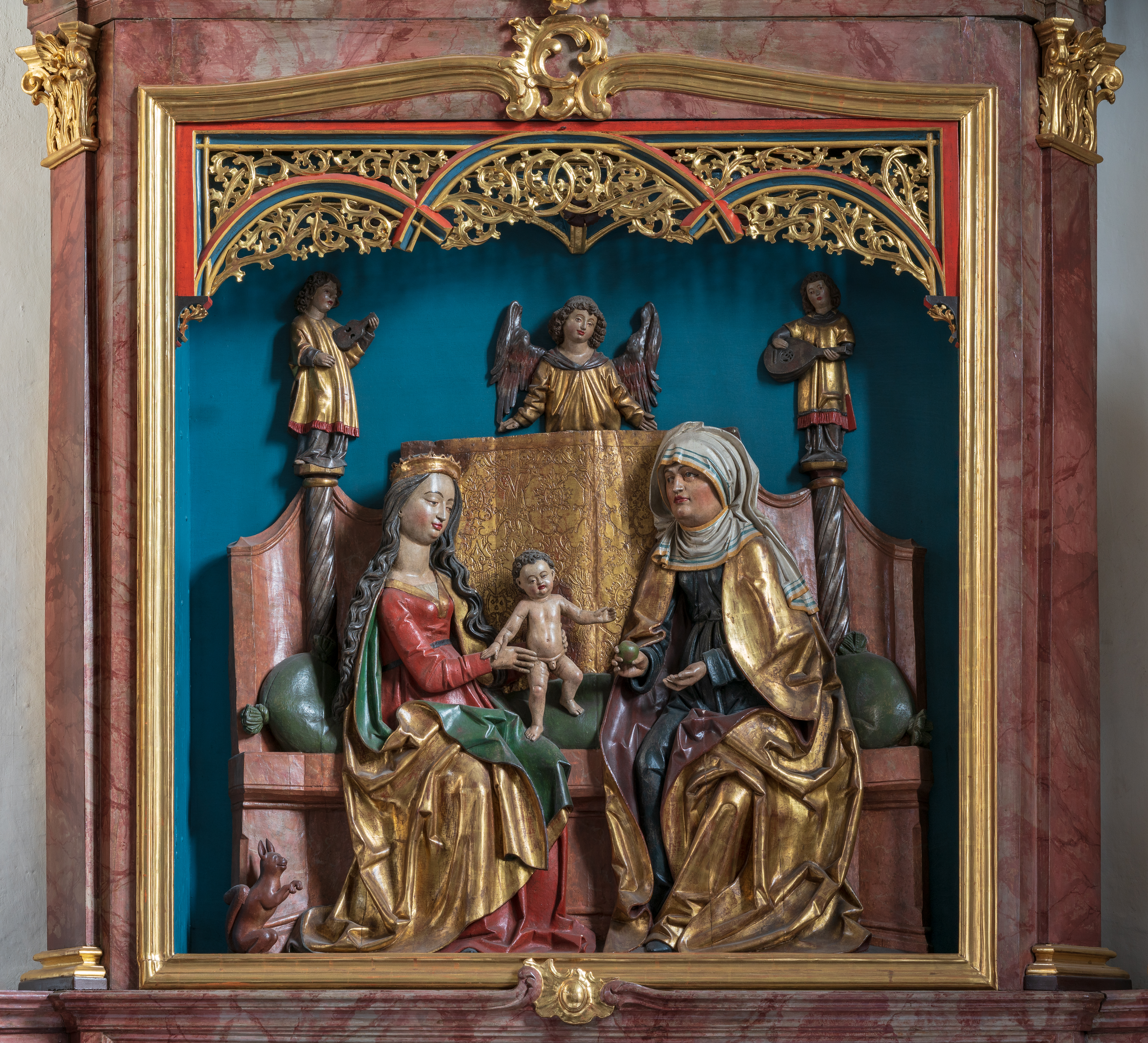
Anna selbdritt (1500), St. Nicholas, Gundelsheim, Germany

Leonardo da Vinci's Virgin and Child with Saint Anne (c. 1501–19), Louvre, Paris

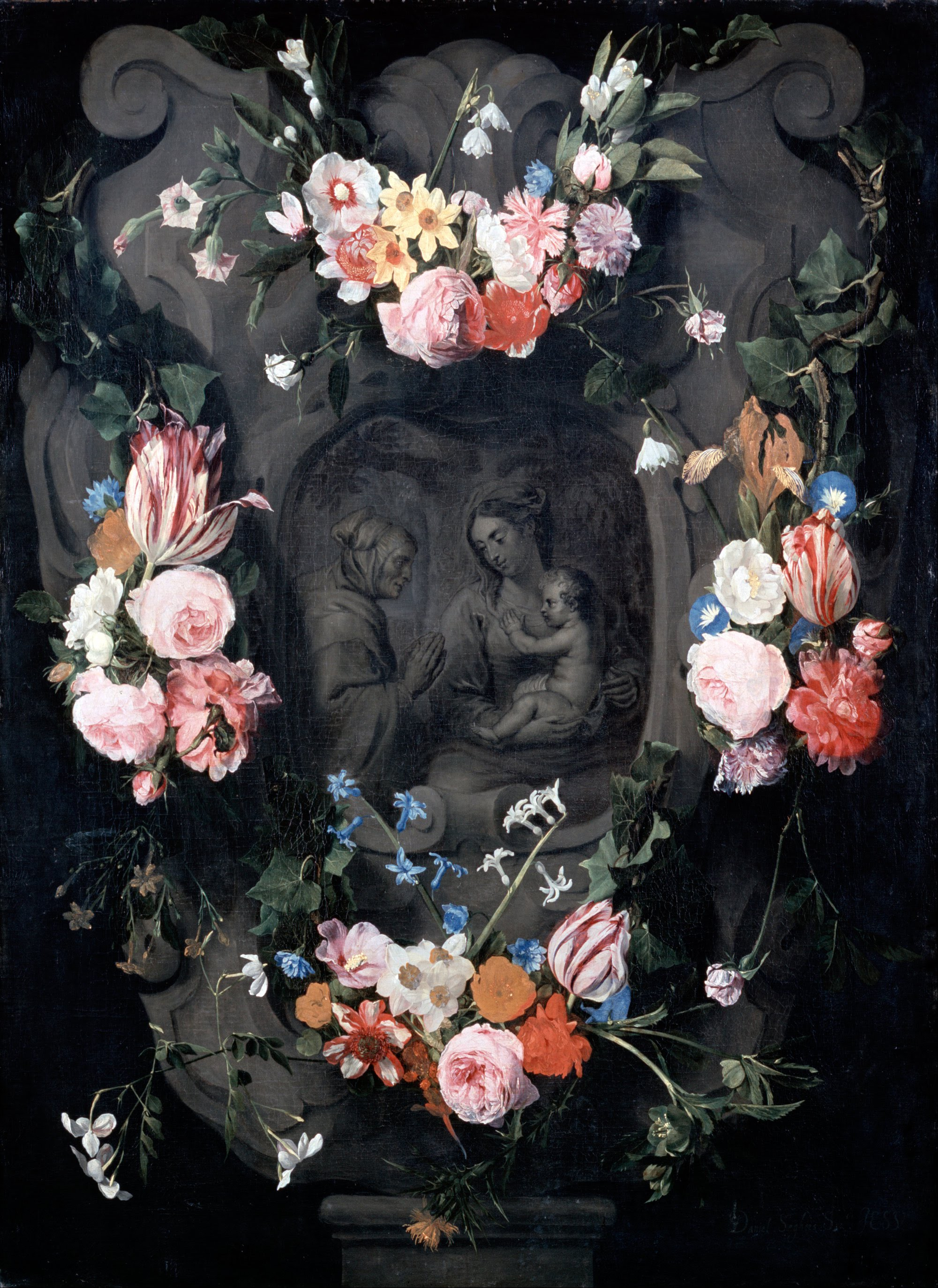
Cartouche with the Virgin and Child and Saint Anne by Daniel Seghers (c. 1590–1661), Dulwich Picture Gallery, London
The Education of the Virgin

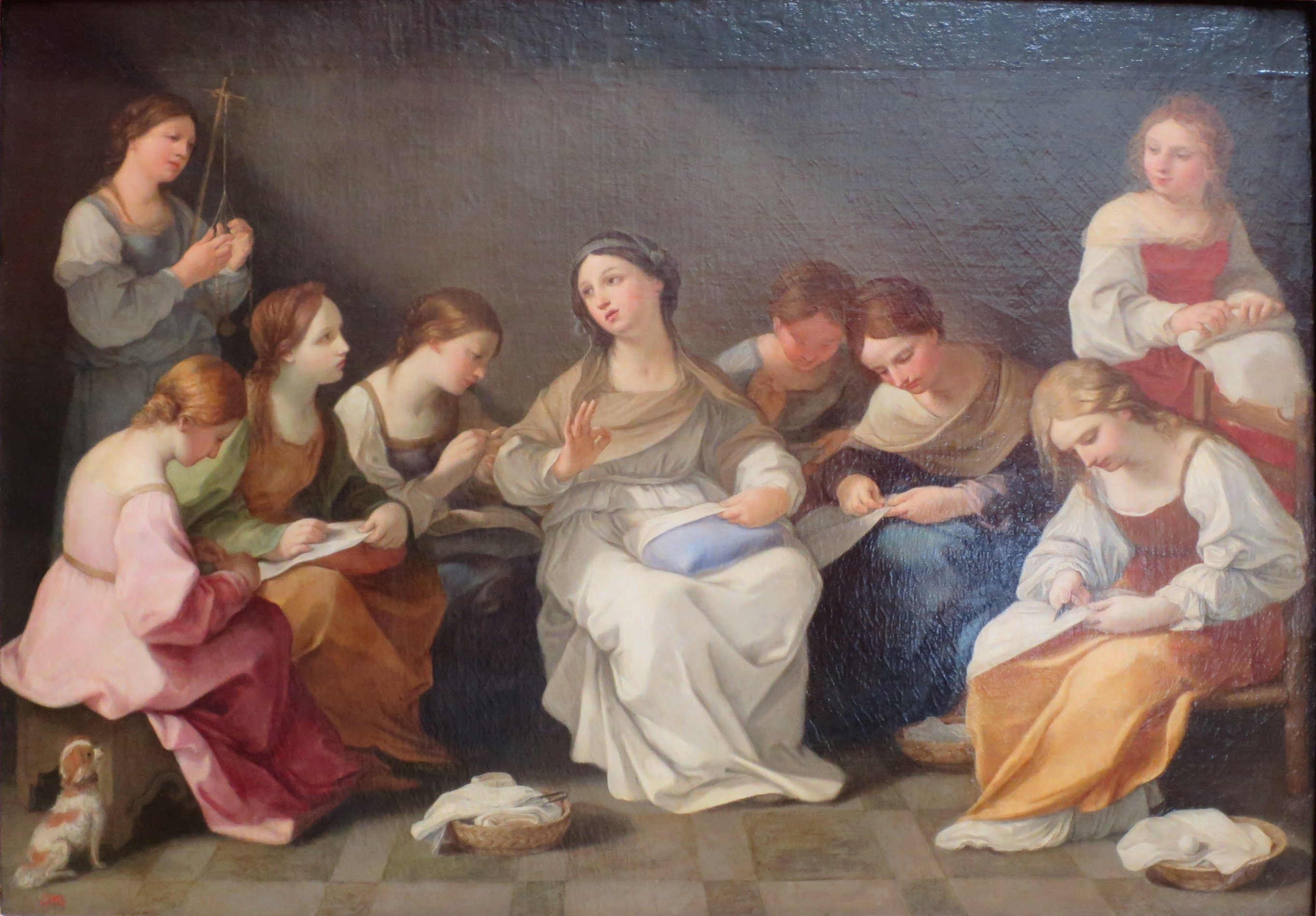
Guido Reni (1640–1642)

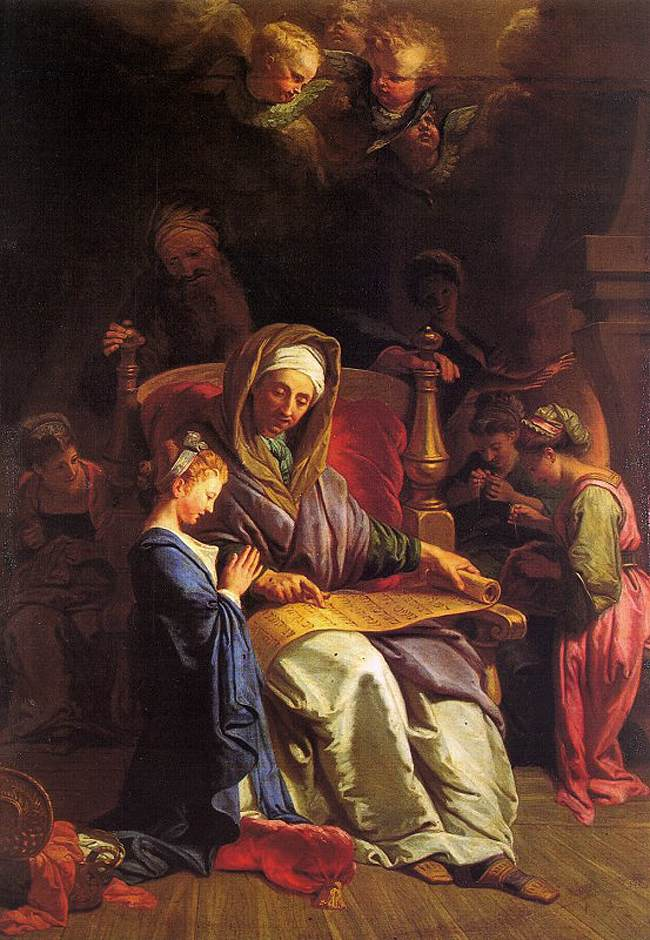
Jean Jouvenet (1700)

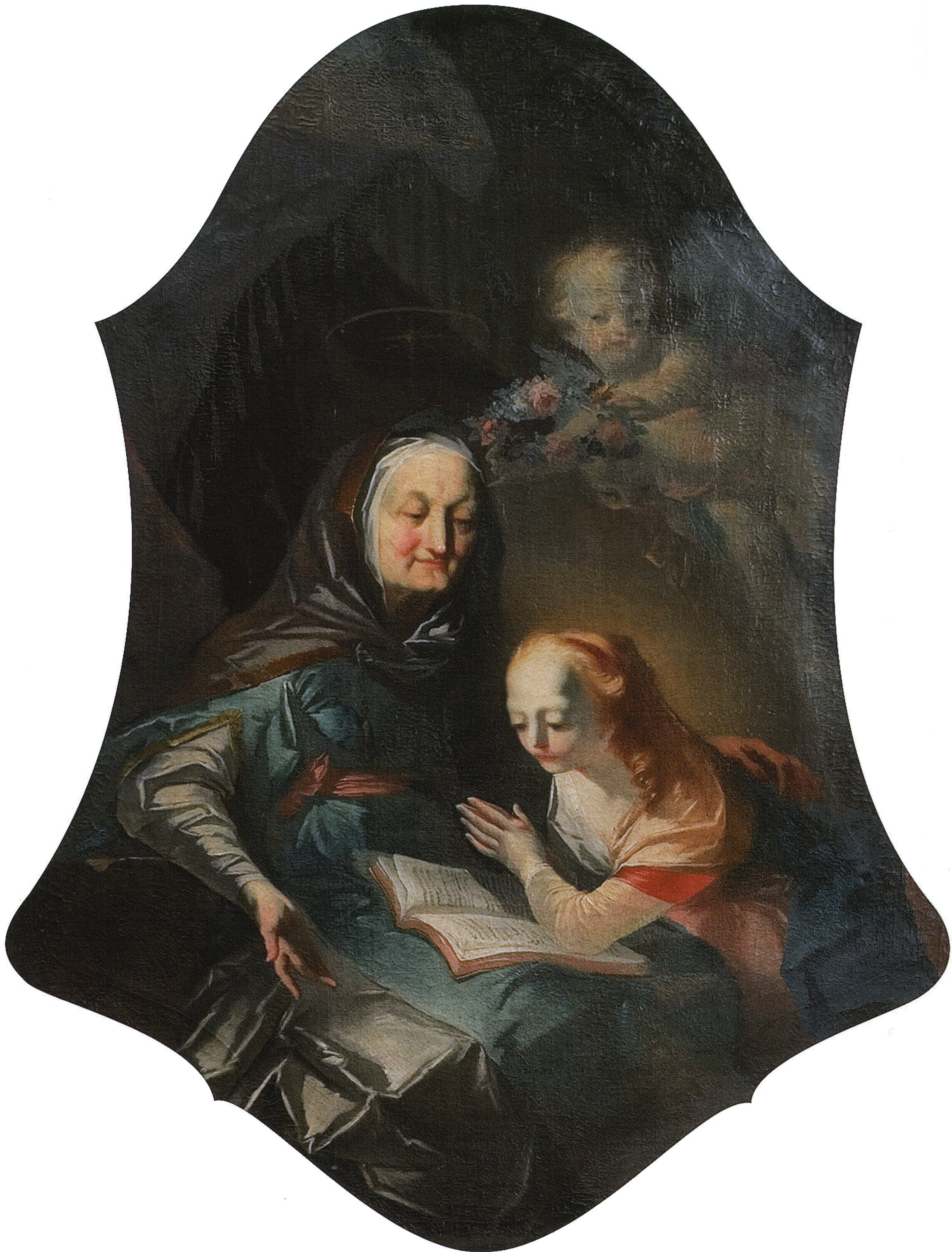
Josef Winterhalder the Younger (1766)

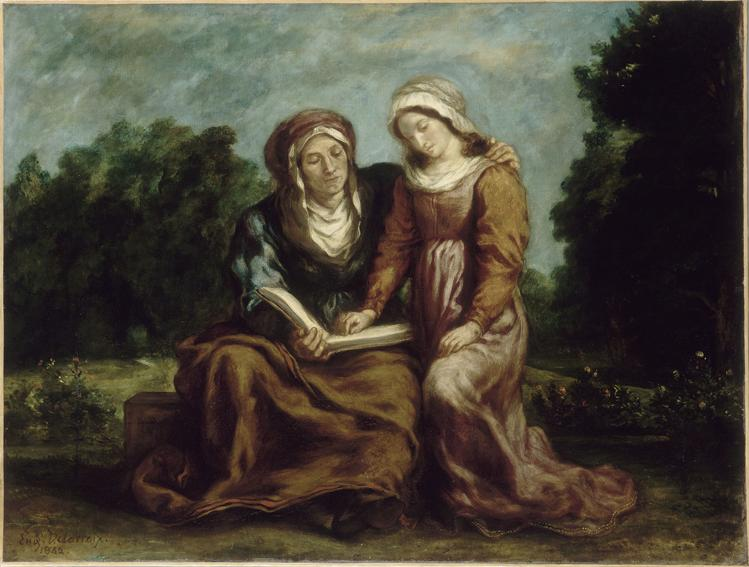
Eugène Delacroix (1842)

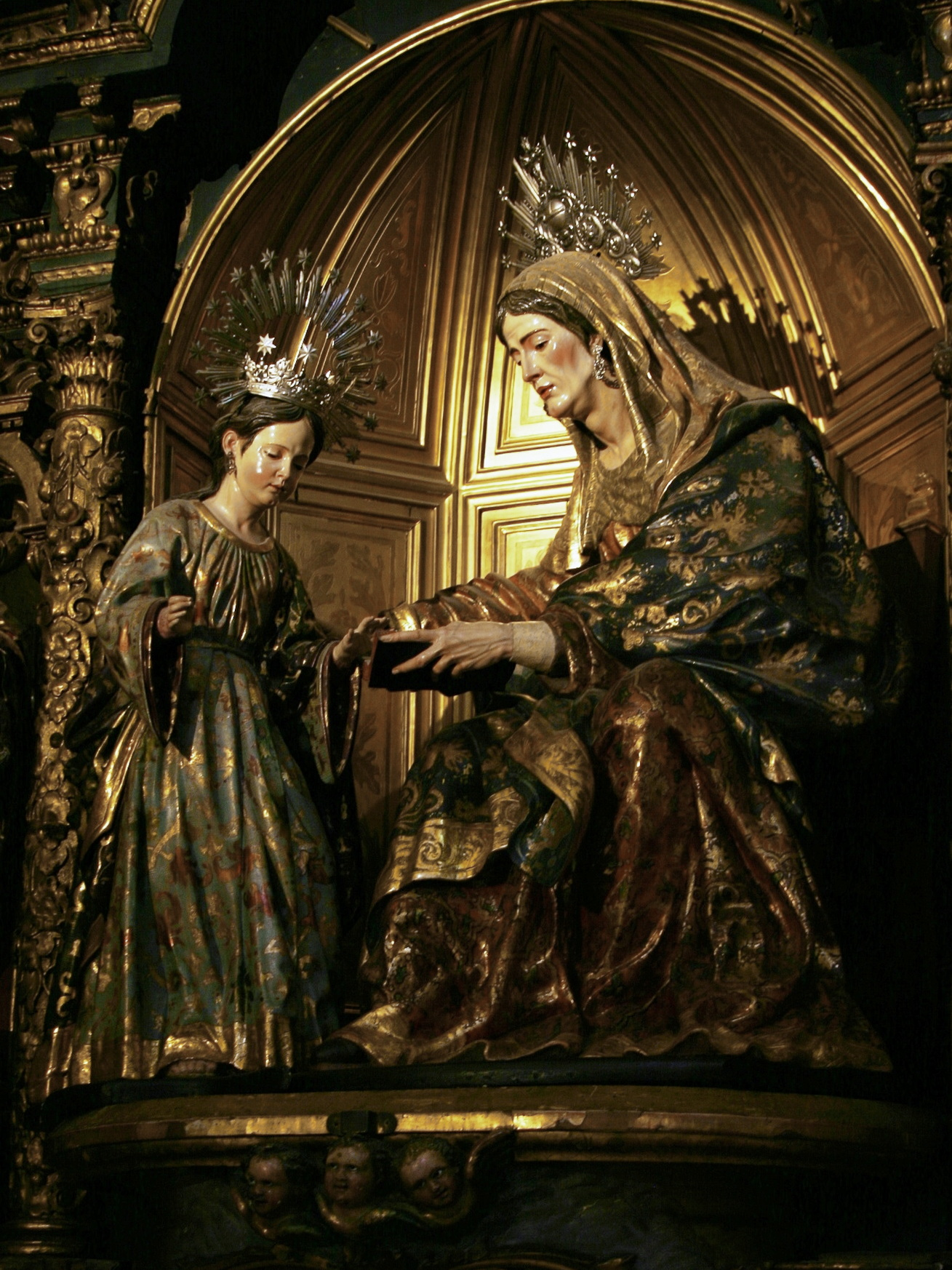
Iglesia del Salvador, Seville

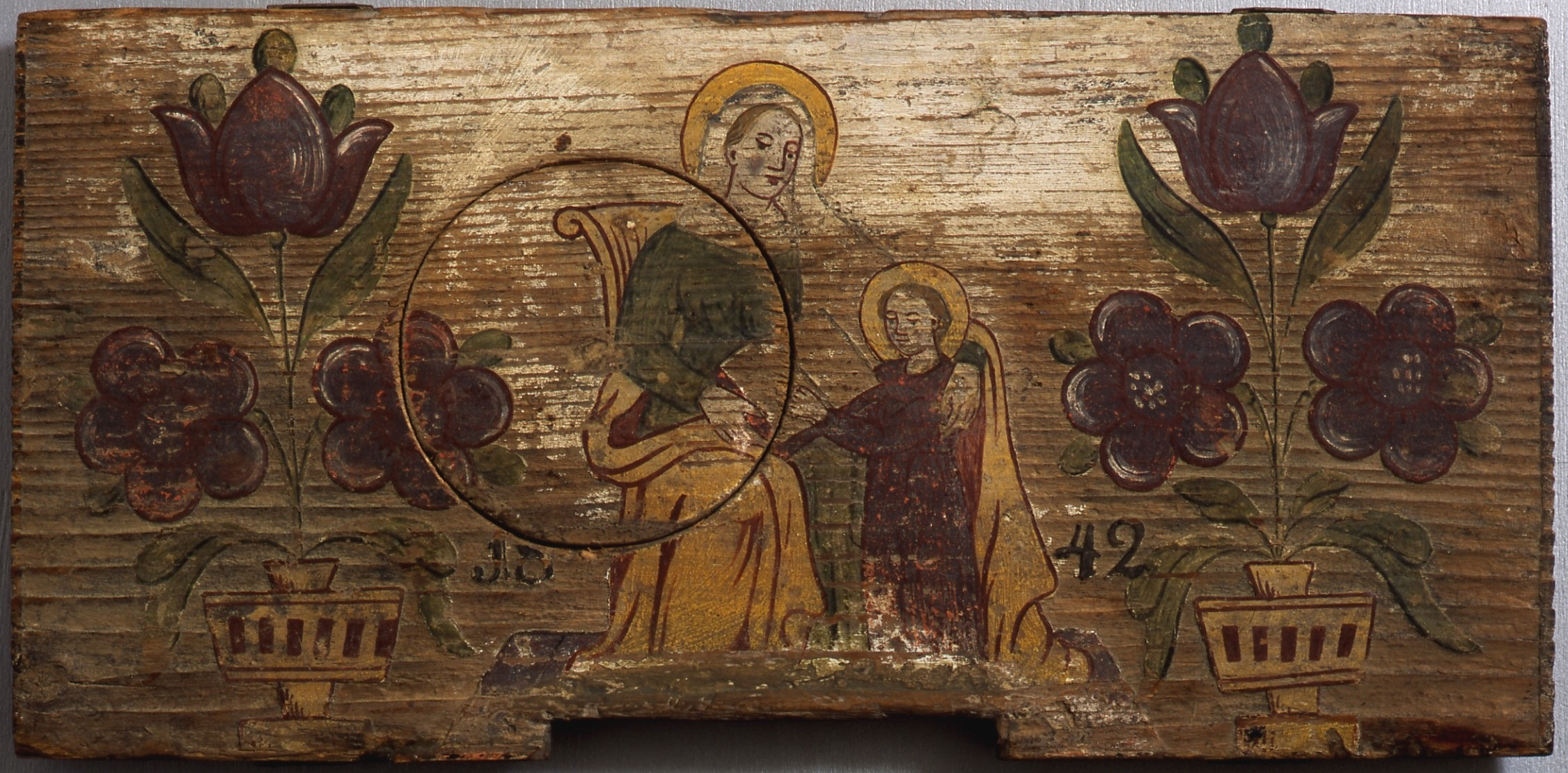
Panel of a beehive decorated with St. Anne flanked by flowers, folk art of Slovenia (1842)

== Music ==
- Marc-Antoine Charpentier composed two motets:
  - Pour Ste Anne, H.315, for two voices and continuo (around 1675)
  - Canticum Annae, H.325, for three voices, two treble instruments, and continuo (around 1680).

== See also ==
- Church of Saint Anne, Jerusalem – Church in East Jerusalem
- Church of St. Ann (disambiguation)
- Feast of the Conception of the Virgin Mary – Liturgical holiday
- Molo Church – Roman Catholic church in Iloilo City, Philippines
- Molo, Iloilo City – District of Iloilo City, Philippines
- Statue of Saint Anne, Charles Bridge – Statue in Prague, Czech Republic
- St Anne's College, Oxford – College of Oxford University, England
- The Line of Saint Anne – Painting by Gerard David
- Virgin and Child with Saint Anne – Subject in Christian art
