= Antonio Luiz Braga =

Brazilian chemist (born 1958)

- Born: May 19, 1958 (age 68); Herculândia, São Paulo, Brazil
- Known for: Organochalcogen chemistry Greener and sustainable protocols asymmetric catalysis
- Spouse: Simone Gonçalves Cardoso
- Children: 3
- Scientific career
- Fields: Organic chemistry
- Institutions: Universidade Federal de Santa Catarina

Antonio Luiz Braga was born in Herculândia, Brazil.

He graduated with a bachelor's degree in chemistry from the Federal University of São Carlos in 1981, master's degree in Organic Chemistry from the University of São Paulo in 1984, and a Ph.D. in Organic Chemistry from the University of São Paulo in 1989 under the guidance of Professor Comasseto.

He was Professor of Chemistry at the Federal University of Santa Maria (1985-2008). He was coordinator of the Chemistry Committee of FAPERGS (2000-2001). He was coordinator of a Center of Excellence project (PRONEX-2005 -.. Support Center for Bio-Organic Organocalcogênios, He was General secretary of the 11th Brazilian Meeting on Organic Synthesis (11th BMOS, 2005). Currently, he is a professor at the Federal University of Santa Catarina, Chemistry Department. He has experience in Organic synthesis, acting on the following topics: Green Chemistry, Asymmetric Catalysis, organoselenium bioactive molecules and selenium and tellurium derived amino acids and other natural products, Synthesis of the seleno-enzyme glutathione peroxidase mimetic. Coordinates CT_Infra projects at UFSC; published over 340 papers in journals recognized by the community, cited by 15115 research articles, H level:.. 66, deposited 8 patents (USA, Brazil). Award: researcher Featured in Chemistry, FAPERGS, 2007; Santa Catarina Outstanding Researcher-Fritz Muller Award (FAPESC, 2023) and BMOS Award, 2024.

In 2009, he was elected member in the advisory board of the International Conference on the Chemistry of Selenium and Tellurium (ICCST). A member of the CNPq Chemistry Committee between 2009 - 2011 (CA Coordinator between 2009 and 2010). Designated and elected member of the Brazilian Academy of Sciences (ABC). In 2014, he was elected to the advisory board of the Brazilian Chemical Society (SBQ).
