= Sobe =

Sobe may refer to:

== People ==
- Sobe (sister of Saint Anne)
- Sobe Charles Umeh
- Abdulla Sodiq, nickname

== Other ==
- SoBe, American brand of teas
- SoBe Entertainment
- South Beach, a neighborhood of Miami Beach, Florida
