= The Line of Saint Anne =

Painting by Gerard David

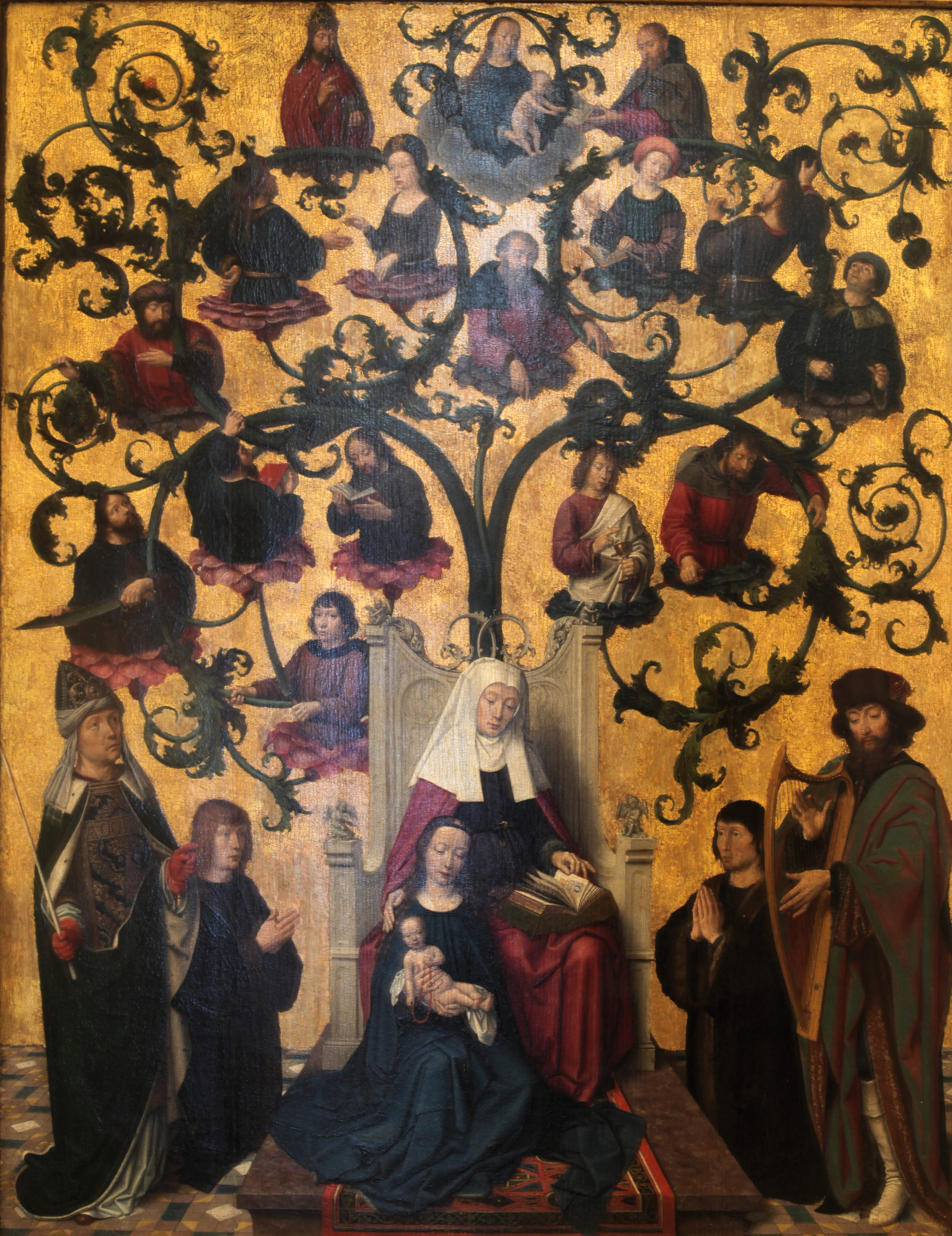

The Line of Saint Anne is a c.1500 oil-on-panel painting by the Early Netherlandish painter Gerard David or his workshop, who certainly painted much of it. It is now in the Museum of Fine Arts of Lyon, France, which acquired it in 1896. It shows the ancestors of Saint Anne, mother of the Virgin Mary, along the lines of a Tree of Jesse; an unusual subject. The use of a gold ground, as here, was also becoming unusual in Netherlandish painting by this date. It measures 88 x 69.5 cm.

The Virgin and Child are at the base of the throne. There are two donor portraits, kneeling next to the throne, and the lowest ancestor figure in the "tree" may be a self-portrait by David, or another artist in his studio. The prophet Isaiah at left and King David, harping at right, complete the figures on the tiled ground level.
