= Emerentia =

Name given for a grandmother of Mary, mother of Jesus

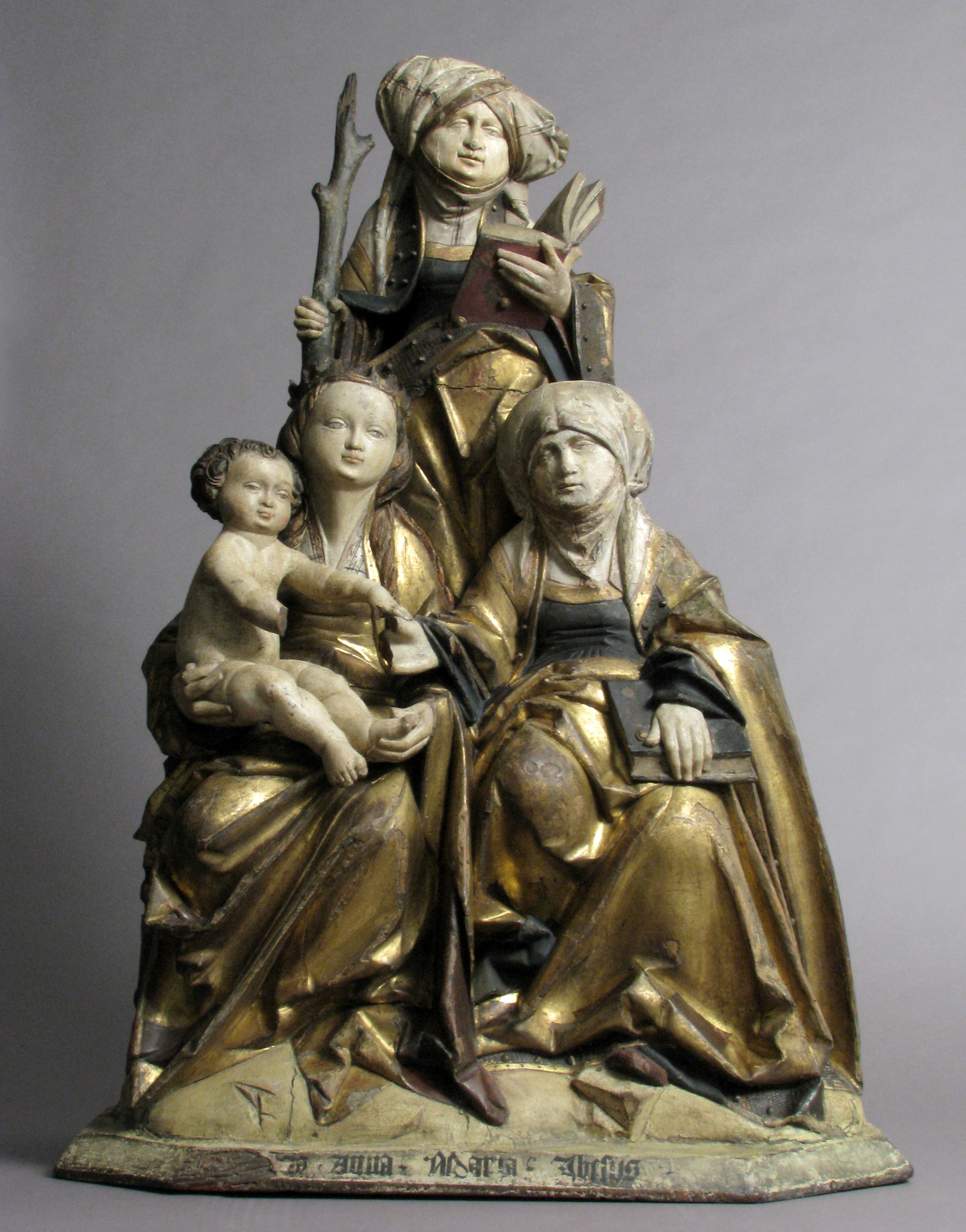
Group showing Emerentia, Saint Anne, the Virgin Mary and the infant Jesus Christ (anonymous, 1400–1600, Metropolitan Museum of Art)

Emerentia is the name given for a grandmother of Mary, mother of Jesus, in some European traditions and art from the late 15th century. She is not to be confused with Saint Emerentiana, a Roman martyr of the 3rd century who features briefly in Alban Butler's The lives of the fathers, martyrs, and other principal saints 1812, volume 1.

== Sources ==
There is no reference to the grandmother of Mary, by name or otherwise, in the canonical New Testament or the Protoevangelium of James, which is the earliest source naming Saint Joachim and Saint Anne as the parents of Mary.

Stories about Anne form part of Jacobus de Voragine's Legenda Aurea, but her mother is not mentioned. An early source mentioning Emerentia, is Josse Bade's (Jodocius Badius Ascensius, 1461–1535) 1502 translation of Petrus Dorlandus' work Vita gloriosissime matris Anne contained in the larger compilation Vita Iesu Christi ... ex evangelio et approbatis ab ecclesia catholica doctoribus sedule collecta per Ludolphum per Saxonia (published in Paris), which tells the story:

Seventy seven years before the birth of Christ, a pious maiden, quite well off and remarkably beautiful, was in the habit of visiting, with her parents' permission, the sons of prophets on Mount Carmel. She was disinclined to marriage, until one of the Carmelites had a prophetic dream, they saw a root from which grew two trees, one had three branches, all bearing flowers, but one a flower more pure and fragrant than all the rest [...] Then a voice was heard saying: "This root is our Emerentia, destined to have great descendants."

Another source is Johann Eck, who related in a sermon that Anne's parents were named Stollanus and Emerentia.

=== In art ===
Emerentia appears in a number of depictions of the Holy Kinship, the pictorial and sometimes sculptural depiction of the ancestors and descendants of St Anne by many artists around the end of the 15th and beginning of the 16th century in Northern Europe. Where Emerentia is featured in these groupings, which were often altarpieces, they are known as "Emerentia Selbviert". These rare examples of a matrilineal genealogy of Jesus have been found interesting by modern academics in the field of gender studies, and in feminist critiques of English literature, for example, Vanita argues that the feminine 'trinity' of Mary, her mother Anne and her grandmother Emerentia is reflected in two of Shakespeare's plays.

== In 18th century and modern literature ==
In The Life of the Blessed Virgin Mary From the Visions of Anna Catherine Emmerich (1852), Emerentia is known as "Emorun," which translates as "noble woman". Emmerich describes in her visions how Emerentia lived as one of the Essenes, a particularly devout wing of the Jewish faith that believed it was destined to produce the Messiah, near Mount Carmel, and relates the story of how a prophet, entering the Cave of Elijah, saw the following growing from Emerentia's heart:

[A] rose tree with three branches, with a rose on each of them. The rose on the second branch was marked with a letter, I think an "M." He saw still more. An angel wrote letters on the wall; I saw Archos rise up as if awaking and read these letters. I forget the details. He then went down from the cave and announced to the maiden who was awaiting his answer that she was to marry and that her sixth suitor was to be her husband. She would bear a child, marked with a sign, who was chosen out of a vessel of election in preparation for the coming of the Savior.
