= Santana do Itararé =

- Municipality
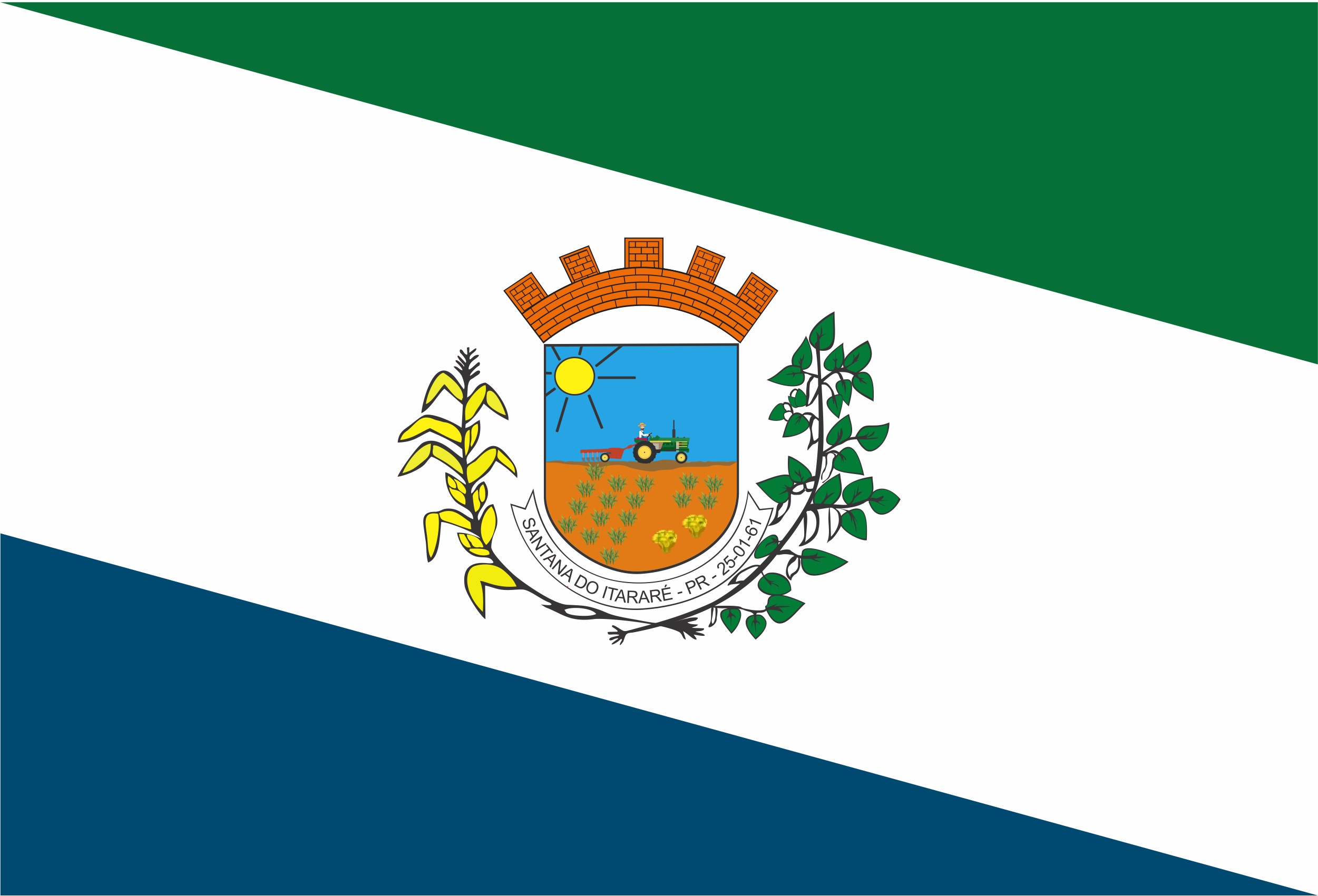
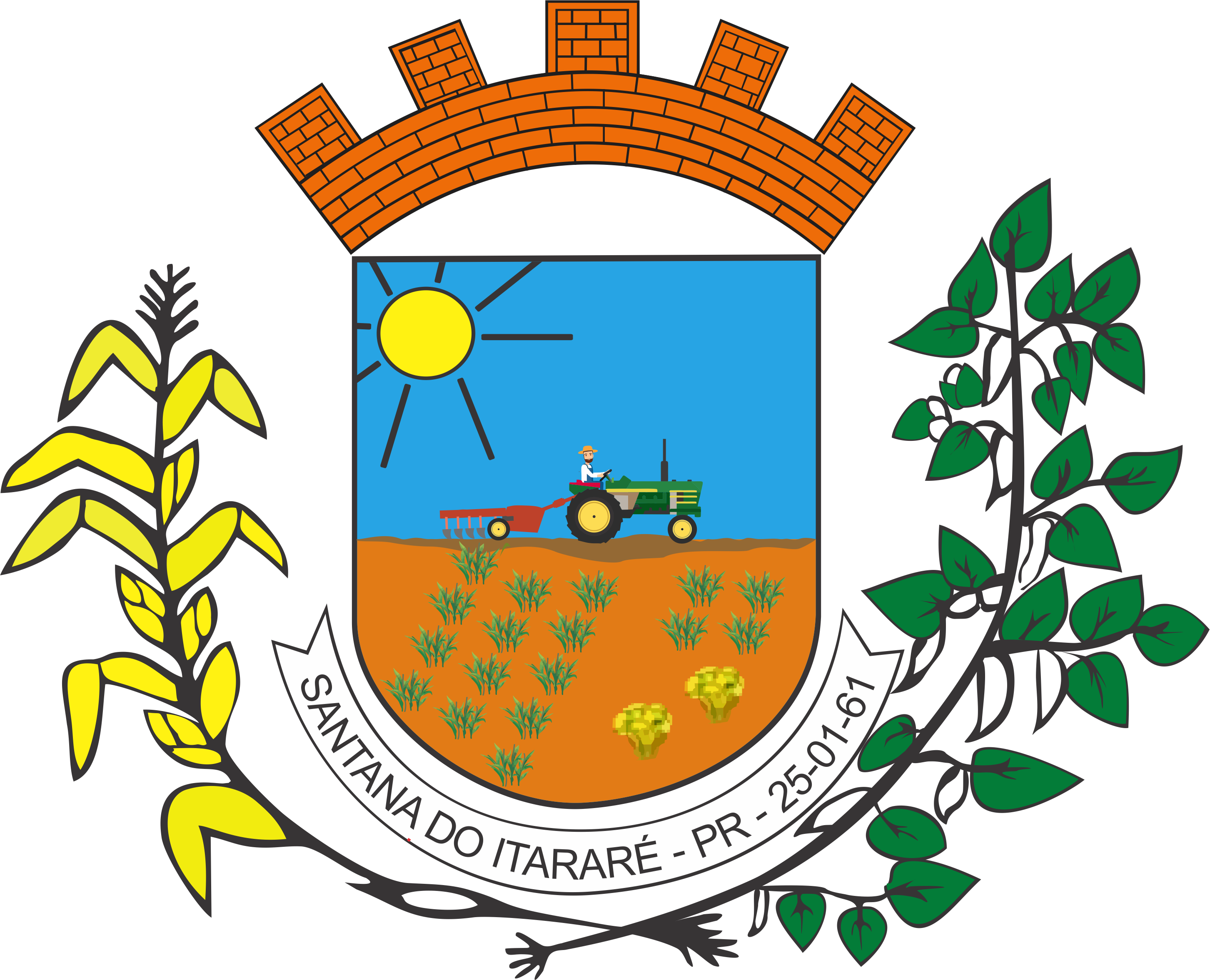
- Flag Coat of arms

- Location in Brazil
- Coordinates: 23°45′18″S 49°37′44″W
- Country: Brazil
- Region: Southern
- State: Paraná
- Mesoregion: Norte Pioneiro Paranaense

Population (2020)
  - Total: 4,954
- Time zone: UTC−3 (BRT)

Santana do Itararé is a municipality in the state of Paraná in the Southern Region of Brazil.

== See also ==
- List of municipalities in Paraná
