= Sobe (sister of Saint Anne) =

Sister of St. Anne, aunt of St. Mary

Sobe, also known as Sovin, was the mother of St. Elizabeth and sister of St. Anne.

The Bible records only that Elizabeth was a descendant of Aaron and a cousin (or relative) of Mary. The name of Sobe first appears in writings of about the 8th century by Hippolytus of Thebes, Andrew of Crete, and Epiphanius Monachus, and later in Nicephorus Callistus and Andronicus. All recount essentially the same passage, given by the last two as follows:

There were three sisters of Bethlehem, daughters of Matthan the priest, and Mary his wife, under the reign of Cleopatra and Sosipatrus, before the reign of Herod, the son of Antipater: the eldest was Mary, the second was Sobe, the youngest's name was Anne. The eldest being married in Bethlehem, had for daughter Salome the midwife; Sobe the second likewise married in Bethlehem, and was the mother of Elizabeth; last of all the third married in Galilee, and brought forth Mary the mother of Christ.

The 19th-century mystic Anne Catherine Emmerich claims that according to her visions (which give a detailed genealogy of Mary), Sobe was a sister of Anne, but the mother of Elizabeth was Emerentia, Sobe and Anne's maternal aunt.

== See also ==
- List of names for the biblical nameless
