= Hercílio Luz =

Hercílio Pedro da Luz
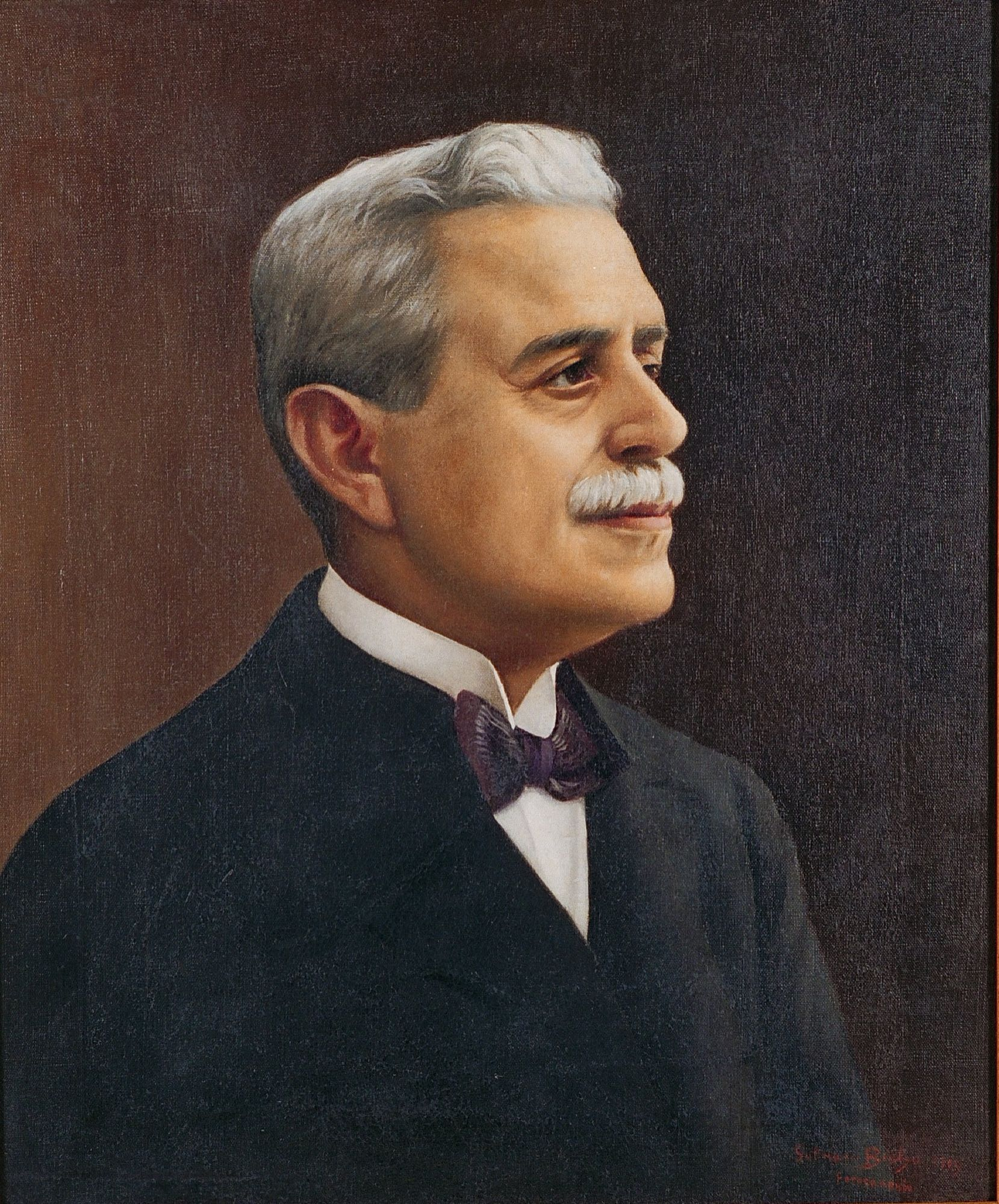
- Portrait by Galdino Guttmann Bicho, 1919 (MASC)

President of Santa Catarina
- In office September 28, 1894 – September 28, 1898
- Preceded by: Antônio Moreira César
- Succeeded by: Polidoro Olavo de São Tiago

President of Santa Catarina
- In office September 28, 1918 – September 28, 1922
- Preceded by: Felipe Schmidt
- Succeeded by: Raulino Horn

President of Santa Catarina
- In office September 28, 1922 – May 9, 1924
- Preceded by: Raulino Horn
- Succeeded by: Antônio Pereira da Silva e Oliveira

Federal Deputy for Santa Catarina
- In office May 2, 1900 – August 2, 1900

Senator for Santa Catarina
- In office 1900–1902

Senator for Santa Catarina
- In office 1903–1905

Senator for Santa Catarina
- In office 1906–1908

Senator for Santa Catarina
- In office 1909–1911

Senator for Santa Catarina
- In office 1912–1915

Senator for Santa Catarina
- In office 1918–1920

Senator for Santa Catarina
- In office 1921–1922

Personal details
- Born: May 29, 1860 Desterro, Province of Santa Catarina, Brazil
- Died: October 20, 1924 (aged 64) Florianópolis, Santa Catarina, Brazil
- Party: Santa Catarina Republican Party
- Occupation: Civil engineer, politician

Hercílio Pedro da Luz (born in Desterro, May 29, 1860 – died in Florianópolis, October 20, 1924) was a Brazilian engineer and politician. He served as president of Santa Catarina on three occasions, held seven terms as a senator representing the state, and was elected federal deputy for Santa Catarina once. He attended secondary school at the Ateneu Catarinense in Desterro and graduated in civil engineering from Ghent University in Belgium. He took office as president of Santa Catarina on September 28, 1894, after being elected by direct vote. His vice president was Polidoro Olavo de São Tiago.

His political career as governor was marked by efforts to encourage settlement in Santa Catarina and investment in roads and ports.

On the national political scene, he followed Francisco Glicério and Pinheiro Machado in the split of the Federal Republican Party, broke politically with Prudente de Morais, and began supporting the positions of Rui Barbosa.

He led the republican opposition in Blumenau against the Santa Catarina Governing Junta of 1891, working alongside José Bonifácio da Cunha and Vitorino de Paula Ramos in the revolt against the government. The junta was formed after Lauro Müller resigned as state governor on December 28, 1891, amid political and military pressure from federalist forces.

He approved the change of the capital's name from Desterro to Florianópolis. He also initiated construction of a suspension bridge intended to connect Santa Catarina Island to the mainland, later named the Hercílio Luz Bridge.

== Biography ==
=== Early life, education, and personal life ===
Hercílio Luz was born on May 29, 1860, in Desterro, now Florianópolis, the capital of Santa Catarina. He was baptized on July 29, 1860, in Desterro, now Florianópolis, Santa Catarina.

He was the son of Jacinto José da Luz and Joaquina Ananias Neves da Luz, a daughter of Joaquim Xavier Neves. On his father's side, he was the grandson of Major José Antônio da Luz. His father died when Hercílio Luz was nine years old.

His paternal ancestry traced back to the Azores, a Portuguese archipelago from which his great-grandfather Manoel Rodrigues da Luz originated. Manoel was born in the parish of Madalena, on Pico Island. According to the biography of João Pinto da Luz published by the Political Memory of Santa Catarina project, Manoel Rodrigues da Luz immigrated to Brazil in 1749.

On his mother's side, his mother, Joaquina Ananias Neves da Luz, daughter of Joaquim Xavier Neves, was descended from bandeirantes, colonial-era Portuguese-Brazilian explorers and expedition leaders.

He began his education in Desterro, where he attended secondary school at the Ateneu Catarinense. He later moved to Rio de Janeiro, where he completed preparatory studies and entered the Polytechnic School of Rio de Janeiro. He subsequently studied civil engineering at Ghent University in Belgium, completing his education and returning to Brazil in 1883, at the age of 23.

Hercílio Luz married Etelvina Cesarina Ferreira da Luz in October 1885, at the age of 25, in Desterro. The couple had 14 children.

After Etelvina's death, Hercílio Luz married her younger sister, Corália dos Reis Ferreira, in July 1915, at the age of 55, also in Desterro. They had five more children.

== Political career ==
=== Land Commission Judge (1885–1886) ===
In 1885, at the age of 24 or 25, Hercílio Luz served as a land commission judge in Lages, in the then Province of Santa Catarina. He held this position until 1886, when he was 25 or 26 years old.

=== Public Works Engineer (1888–1891) ===
Between 1888 and 1891, Hercílio Luz served as a Public Works engineer in the Province of Santa Catarina, a period during which he was between 27 and 31 years old.

=== Head of the Blumenau Land Commission (1891–1893) ===
On January 9, 1891, Hercílio Luz became head of the Blumenau Land Commission, following an appointment by Governor Lauro Müller. Government correspondence dated January 9 of that year records his appointment as head of the land-survey commission in the municipality.

=== Hercílio Luz's political opposition in Blumenau ===
On February 24, 1891, Brazil's first republican constitution was promulgated during the government of Deodoro da Fonseca. On June 11 of the same year, the Constitution of the State of Santa Catarina was promulgated as part of the institutional reorganization under the new republican regime.

On November 3, 1891, Deodoro da Fonseca dissolved the National Congress and declared a state of siege in an episode known as the November 3 Coup. The measure worsened the national political crisis and provoked opposition from civilian and military groups. On November 23, under political and military pressure, Deodoro resigned from the presidency, and Vice President Floriano Peixoto succeeded him.

On December 28, 1891, Lauro Müller resigned as governor of Santa Catarina following pressure from his opponents amid the political crisis caused by Deodoro's coup. The following day, after a brief interim administration by Firmino Lopes Rego, the Santa Catarina Governing Junta of 1891 took office. It consisted of Arthur Deocleciano de Oliveira, Cristóvão Nunes Pires, and Luís dos Reis Falcão. In this context, Hercílio Luz became one of the leaders of the republican opposition in Blumenau against the junta, alongside José Bonifácio da Cunha and Vitorino de Paula Ramos.

On January 1, 1892, José Bonifácio da Cunha assumed the office of municipal superintendent of Blumenau, to which he had been elected. The governing junta, however, dissolved the municipal councils and ordered the appointment of administrative councils to govern the municipalities.

On January 11, 1892, Hercílio Luz, as head of the Blumenau Land Commission, sent a letter challenging the legitimacy of the Santa Catarina Governing Junta of 1891. In the document, he stated that, because he considered the commission a federal agency, he could conduct official correspondence only with the governor whom he regarded as legally constituted. On the same date, he returned official letters and documents he had received from state authorities.

The governing junta remained in power until March 1, 1892, when Floriano Peixoto appointed Manuel Joaquim Machado to take over the state government. Hercílio Luz continued to oppose Machado's administration and, according to the biographical entry published by the Center for Research and Documentation of Contemporary Brazilian History (CPDOC), was imprisoned during his government.

=== Hercílio Luz's imprisonment and the judicial-political crisis ===
- December 30, 1892 — Dispute over the right to a defense: Hercílio reportedly sought out a magistrate to submit documents that, according to his defense, would demonstrate irregularities in the collection of evidence used in accusations of violence against settlers. According to this account, during the meeting the judge allegedly punched Hercílio and attempted to take the documents from him.
- February 16, 1893 — Arrest of Manoel dos Santos Lostada and armed confrontation: Hercílio Luz requested a certificate related to the investigation into allegations of violence against settlers from justice of the peace Friedrich Rabe. Public prosecutor Manoel dos Santos Lostada went to obtain the document, but police commissioner Elesbão Pinto da Luz prevented the certificate from being issued. After an argument with Lostada, the police commissioner ordered his arrest several hours later, while the prosecutor was at the business premises of Henrique Probst. After Lostada's arrest, Hercílio and his supporters gathered to demand his release, and the episode culminated in a gunfight. The armed confrontation took place between police commissioner Elesbão Pinto da Luz, a member of the Liberal Party who later became associated with the Federalist movement, and Hercílio Luz's supporters, who were heading to the jail to demand Lostada's release. According to the account published in Blumenau em Cadernos, Elesbão fired at Hercílio, and members of the group returned fire, wounding the commissioner.
- February 21, 1893 — Arrival of the chief of police: Francisco Antônio Vieira Caldas arrived in Blumenau with 26 soldiers to investigate the armed confrontation. Following the investigation, Caldas gathered evidence against Hercílio Luz and his political allies, who were formally charged in the criminal proceedings.
- March 3, 1893 — Transfer of the prisoners: Hercílio Luz, José Bonifácio da Cunha, Manoel dos Santos Lostada, and Francisco Margarida were escorted to Desterro, then the capital of Santa Catarina.
- June 8, 1893 — Hercílio's release, return to Blumenau, celebrations, and gunfire: After the case reached the Supreme Federal Court of Brazil, Hercílio Luz and his companions were released through a writ of habeas corpus. Previously, the Superior Court of Justice of Santa Catarina had ruled that the accused should not be committed for trial by jury. Governor Manoel dos Santos Lostada dissolved that court and established a Court of Appeals. Hercílio Luz and his companions returned to Blumenau, where they were welcomed with celebrations, followed by a ball at the Hotel Cristiano Schmidt. During the celebration, a confrontation occurred between local police and attendees. According to José Deeke's account, a police officer, several soldiers, and six civilians were injured. Soldiers then fired several volleys into the hall, causing panic but no further casualties. The shooting at the June 8 celebration at the Hotel Cristiano Schmidt took place amid political disputes between republicans aligned with Hercílio Luz and forces associated with the state government of Manuel Joaquim Machado.

On June 18, 1893, Manuel Joaquim Machado left the government of Santa Catarina after being convicted by the Federal Justice in a case related to the arrest and deportation of Manuel Vitorino de Paula Ramos, a republican engineer and politician. The complaint had been filed by federal deputy Felipe Schmidt. As a result of the court decision, Machado was removed from office and succeeded by state vice president Eliseu Guilherme da Silva.

=== The Republican Revolution of Tijucas ===
On July 14, 1893, amid the political crisis in Santa Catarina and the Federalist Revolution, Hercílio Luz took part in the so-called Republican Revolution of Tijucas, a movement opposed to the state government of Eliseu Guilherme da Silva. According to historian Henrique Oscar Wiederspahn, Hercílio Luz, together with judge Genuíno Firmino Vidal Capistrano and local supporters, deposed the municipal council of Tijucas and confronted a detachment of approximately 50 men sent to arrest him, successfully preventing his capture.

After the action, Hercílio returned to Blumenau, where he met with Vitorino de Paula Ramos, José Bonifácio da Cunha, and other political allies to organize a volunteer force.

On July 22, 1893, during a solemn session of the Municipal Council of Blumenau, attended by a large crowd, Hercílio Luz was proclaimed provisional governor of Santa Catarina and sworn into office. On the same occasion, the city was declared the provisional seat of the state government. According to an account published by José Deeke, Vitorino de Paula Ramos spoke about the reasons for the movement and stated that several municipalities had joined the initiative. News of these events was sent to Desterro, now Florianópolis, where a delegation approached Eliseu Guilherme da Silva and asked him to resign. Eliseu refused.

After Eliseu Guilherme da Silva refused to resign, his state government sent police forces against Blumenau in an attempt to suppress the movement led by Hercílio Luz. On July 28, 1893, an armed confrontation took place near the Wloch Bridge. According to an account published in Blumenau em Cadernos, the city's defenders managed to repel the police force after an exchange of gunfire.

After the confrontation, Hercílio Luz, Vitorino de Paula Ramos, and José Bonifácio da Cunha set out with the volunteers toward the state capital. They boarded the steamer Itapemirim at Porto Belo, bound for Desterro, now Florianópolis. According to a message from Eliseu Guilherme da Silva reproduced by José Deeke, more than 130 members of the Civic Guard, armed with Comblain rifles, arrived in the capital and were housed in the barracks of the 25th Infantry Battalion.

On July 30, 1893, the volunteers marched through the streets of Desterro, while artillery pieces were positioned in front of the Government Palace. In the early hours of July 31, an armed confrontation took place near the building, leaving people dead and wounded. During the fighting, Hercílio's supporters occupied the palace and other public offices. Eliseu Guilherme da Silva left the building but did not recognize the legitimacy of the provisional government. Hercílio then claimed authority over the state government from the capital.

On August 2, 1893, President Floriano Peixoto refused to recognize Hercílio Luz's provisional government and removed him from his position as head of the Blumenau Land Commission. Without federal recognition, the provisional government failed to consolidate its authority. Hercílio was later appointed head of the Telegraph District, with jurisdiction extending from Morretes, in Paraná, to Torres, in Rio Grande do Sul.

=== Participation in the Federalist Revolution and the Siege of Lapa ===
After being appointed head of the Telegraph District, with jurisdiction from Morretes, in Paraná, to Torres, in Rio Grande do Sul, Hercílio Luz was dismissed from the position as the Federalist Revolution advanced through Santa Catarina and the Revolt of the Navy spread to southern Brazil. He was subsequently assigned as a technical engineer to the legalist forces commanded by General Francisco de Paula Argolo, which defended the government of President Floriano Peixoto. On October 17, 1893, Argolo arrived in Curitiba accompanied by Hercílio Luz, captains Lauro Müller and Felipe Schmidt, and Lieutenant Carlos de Campos.

The expedition proceeded to São Bento do Sul, in northern Santa Catarina. On November 5, 1893, a legalist state government headquarters was established at the residence of physician Felipe Maria Wolf, in opposition to the revolutionary authorities controlling Desterro, now Florianópolis. The column commanded by Argolo continued military operations against Federalist forces advancing through Paraná.

During the campaign, Hercílio Luz used his engineering expertise to support the movement of the legalist troops. In the Rio Negro region, on the border between Paraná and Santa Catarina, he took part in repairing the bridge over the Várzea River, whose destruction had hindered the movement of the forces. The repairs allowed the legalist column to continue toward the city of Lapa, where resistance to the Federalists was concentrated.

In the following months, Hercílio accompanied General Antônio Ernesto Gomes Carneiro during the resistance to Federalist forces at Lapa, during the Siege of Lapa, in 1894. The episode was part of the military campaign between republican legalists and Federalists in southern Brazil.

On September 8, 1894, after legalist forces retook Desterro (now Florianópolis) during the Federalist Revolution, Hercílio Luz was elected governor of Santa Catarina by the Santa Catarina Republican Party, with Polidoro Olavo de São Tiago as vice governor. On September 28, he took office in a solemn session before the state Representative Congress, succeeding Colonel Antônio Moreira César, who had governed the state as a federal interventor appointed by President Floriano Peixoto. Moreira César formally handed over the government after the period of federal intervention.

=== Election and first administration (1894–1898) ===
On September 8, 1894, after legalist forces regained control of the state during the Federalist Revolution, elections were held for the government of Santa Catarina and the state legislature. Hercílio Luz, a member of the Santa Catarina Republican Party, was elected governor, with Polidoro Olavo de São Tiago as vice governor. The election marked the selection of Santa Catarina's first republican governor by direct vote.

Hercílio Luz took office on September 28, 1894, beginning a term that lasted until September 28, 1898. During the first days of his administration, on October 1, he sanctioned State Law No. 111, which changed the capital's name from Desterro to Florianópolis in honor of President Floriano Peixoto. The change took place after the conflicts of the Federalist Revolution and the retaking of the city by legalist troops.

During his first administration, Hercílio Luz encouraged settlement in the state and invested in roads and ports, seeking to improve territorial integration and the state's infrastructure. At the end of his term, on September 28, 1898, he was succeeded by Felipe Schmidt.

=== Municipal Council and entry into the National Congress (1898–1900) ===
In 1898, after completing his first term as governor of Santa Catarina, Hercílio Luz was elected to the Municipal Council of Florianópolis, then known as Desterro. He was reelected in subsequent years and remained on the municipal body until 1902. During this period, he combined his local political activities with his entry into national politics, representing the people of Santa Catarina in the National Congress.

In the 1899 election, Hercílio Luz was elected federal deputy for Santa Catarina for the 25th Legislature (1900–1902). The election result was challenged by Eliseu Guilherme da Silva, but Hercílio's credentials were recognized on April 29, 1900. He took office in the Chamber of Deputies on May 2 of that year.

On March 9, 1900, Santa Catarina senator Antônio Justiniano Esteves Júnior died, leaving a vacancy in the state's representation in the Federal Senate. In a special election held on June 10, Hercílio Luz was elected to fill the seat. His election was recognized on July 13, and he took his seat in the Senate on August 31, 1900. To assume the new position, he resigned from the office of federal deputy on August 2 of that year.

His election to the Senate marked the beginning of a long career for Hercílio Luz in the federal legislature. He served as a representative of Santa Catarina during the 1900–1902 legislative term and was reelected for subsequent terms. In later years, he also served on the Senate's governing board and participated in parliamentary committees.

=== Service in the Federal Senate and return to state government (1900–1918) ===
After taking his seat in the Federal Senate in 1900, Hercílio Luz remained active in national politics, being reelected senator for Santa Catarina for successive legislative terms as a member of the Santa Catarina Republican Party. During the 1903–1905 legislative term, he served as third secretary of the Senate's governing board and was a member of the committees on Public Health, Statistics and Colonization, Public Works, and Privileged Enterprises. His parliamentary career continued through subsequent terms until 1918.

In August 1918, Hercílio Luz was elected vice governor of Santa Catarina on a ticket headed by Lauro Müller, who had been elected governor but resigned before taking office. When Felipe Schmidt's term ended on September 28, 1918, Hercílio assumed the state government for the second time, beginning an administration that lasted until September 28, 1922.

Reception held for then-Governor Vidal Ramos and his entourage at the site of the future headquarters of the Catarinense Gymnasium, on January 4, 1906. Those pictured include Father Carlo Norberto Ploes, Carl Hoepcke, Vidal Ramos, Leite, Lieutenant Eurico Castro, Dr. Fabrício D’Ávila, Father Luis Shuler, Joaquim Costa and Frei Zeno, Hercílio Luz, Gustavo Richard, Pereira e Oliveira, Colonel Germano Wendhausen, and Felipe Schmidt.

==== Railway infrastructure ====
In 1907, Hercílio Luz submitted a request for information to the Federal Senate concerning a railway between the states of Bahia and Piauí. The request was recorded in the Annals of the Federal Senate for that year.

==== Naval reorganization bill ====
On June 4, 1908, Hercílio Luz introduced a bill in the Federal Senate proposing the transfer of the Navy Arsenal's workshops to Cobras Island, in Guanabara Bay, and the construction of a new arsenal and naval port. The proposal also authorized the establishment of two naval support bases for the Brazilian fleet, one on the southern coast, in the state of Santa Catarina, and another on the country's northern coast.

==== Political situation in Santa Catarina ====
In a speech delivered in the Federal Senate on September 11, 1908, Hercílio Luz addressed the political situation in Santa Catarina and advocated what he described as a form of “moral intervention” by the federal government. During his speech, he criticized Governor Gustavo Richard and stated that the people of Santa Catarina would not tolerate tyranny. The speech was recorded in the Annals of the Federal Senate for 1908, Book 5, in the session of September 11.

==== Federal intervention and state autonomy ====
In August 1910, Hercílio Luz took part in debates in the Federal Senate concerning federal intervention in the State of Rio de Janeiro, amid a political crisis arising from a dispute between rival groups over control of state institutions. The controversy concerned recognition of the legitimacy of the Rio de Janeiro Legislative Assembly and the limits of federal government involvement in state political affairs.

The debate took place during the presidency of Nilo Peçanha, who submitted a request for intervention in the state to Congress. The discussion reflected tensions between federal authority and the principle of state autonomy during the First Brazilian Republic.

==== Debate on amnesty related to the Revolt of the Lash ====
In November 1910, sailors in the Brazilian Navy rebelled against corporal punishment, particularly flogging, and the disciplinary conditions to which they were subjected. To end the revolt, the National Congress approved an amnesty for those involved, formalized by Decree No. 2,280 of November 25, 1910.

During a debate in the Federal Senate in 1911, Hercílio Luz praised Ruy Barbosa for his defense of the amnesty, stating that the senator from Bahia had once again demonstrated “his great patriotism.” In an exchange with Firmino Pires Ferreira, the latter clarified that his objection concerned the choice of Ruy Barbosa to introduce the bill, rather than the substance of Barbosa's defense. The exchange was recorded in the Annals of the Federal Senate for 1911.

==== Speech on the border dispute between Santa Catarina and Paraná ====
On May 11, 1911, Hercílio Luz spoke in the Federal Senate about conflicts along the border between Santa Catarina and Paraná, amid the territorial dispute between the two states. During his speech, he read telegrams sent by Santa Catarina Governor Vidal Ramos describing the creation of a police district by Paraná that included part of the territory claimed by Santa Catarina in the Canoinhas region, the presence of Paraná state forces, and the risk of clashes. Hercílio also requested that the events be brought to the attention of President Hermes da Fonseca.

During the debate, Senator Generoso Marques dos Santos disputed some of the claims, stating that the government of Paraná had already replied to Vidal Ramos's telegram and that he was unaware of the reports concerning clashes in the disputed region.

==== Speech on the Federalist Revolution in the Senate ====
In a speech delivered in the Federal Senate on August 1, 1911, Hercílio Luz recalled his participation in the events of 1893 and attributed the spread of the Federalist Revolution to Santa Catarina to the dissolution of the state's Supreme Court of Justice by the then military governor, Manuel Joaquim Machado. During the debate, he stated:

“Does the Senator know the main cause of that revolution in Santa Catarina? It was the dissolution of the State Supreme Court of Justice by the military governor who was in office there.”

When Senator Firmino Pires Ferreira asked him to identify the military governor, Hercílio Luz initially said that he preferred not to mention names. After further questioning, he identified Manuel Joaquim Machado, acknowledging his military qualities but criticizing his administrative performance and describing him as the worst governor Santa Catarina had ever had. Hercílio then claimed that Machado had brought the revolution into the state, whereas, according to his account, the conflict had previously been confined to Rio Grande do Sul.

==== Request for information about the transfer of Lloyd Brasileiro ====
On August 22, 1911, Hercílio Luz submitted Request for Information No. 2 to the Federal Senate, concerning negotiations to sell Lloyd Brasileiro to a foreign company. He asked the federal government for information about the negotiations and the possible consequences of the transfer for national shipping.

The vote on the request was postponed on August 22 and held the following day, when the proposal was approved. In a later speech, Hercílio Luz returned to the subject and commented on the executive branch's response, which addressed the consequences that a possible transfer of Lloyd Brasileiro to a foreign company could have for domestic coastal shipping.

==== Criticism of the postal service ====
In October 1911, Hercílio Luz questioned information provided by the federal postal administration concerning a letter he said he had sent to President Hermes da Fonseca. According to a report published by the newspaper A Noite on October 20, Hercílio read a news item in the Federal Senate stating that the acting director of the postal service, Firmino Rocha, had presented documents indicating that the correspondence had not passed through any post office or branch. Hercílio disputed the explanation and said he would wait for the information to be officially published before commenting further on the Brazilian postal service, whose operation he criticized.

=== Second government of Santa Catarina (1918–1922) ===
On September 28, 1918, Hercílio Luz took office as governor of Santa Catarina for the second time, succeeding Felipe Schmidt. He had been elected vice governor on a ticket headed by Lauro Müller, who resigned before taking office. Hercílio remained in office until September 28, 1922, when he began his third term as governor.

His administration included urban sanitation and redevelopment projects in Florianópolis. Among the principal initiatives was the canalization of the Rio da Bulha and the construction of an avenue along its course, initially known as Avenida do Saneamento and later renamed Avenida Hercílio Luz. The project aimed to improve sanitary conditions and reorganize the urban environment through the canalization and straightening of the river and the urban development of the surrounding land.

These interventions also had social consequences. The demolition of houses displaced residents, including Afro-Brazilian families, who were pushed toward peripheral areas of the city. Historical studies have connected this process to the sanitation policies and concepts of urban modernization prevalent at the time.

Another major undertaking during Hercílio Luz's administration was the project for a permanent bridge connecting Santa Catarina Island to the mainland. Developed in 1919, the project sought to improve transportation and communication between the island and the continental part of Florianópolis. Construction began on November 14, 1922, during his third term. Initially planned under the name Ponte da Independência (Independence Bridge), it was later named Hercílio Luz Bridge in his honor.

=== Third government and construction of the Hercílio Luz Bridge (1922–1924) ===
On September 28, 1922, Hercílio Luz took office as governor of Santa Catarina for the third time, after being reelected to a term that was scheduled to run until 1926. His vice governor was Antônio Pereira da Silva e Oliveira, who served as acting governor during Hercílio Luz's absences.

One of the main initiatives of his administration was the construction of a bridge connecting Santa Catarina Island to the mainland, intended to replace the island's dependence on ferry services and improve transportation between Florianópolis and the rest of the state.

Initially called Ponte da Independência (Independence Bridge), construction began on November 14, 1922. The suspension bridge was designed to provide the first permanent connection between the island and the mainland. American companies were contracted for the project, and metal components were imported from the United States. Construction continued over the following years.

On October 8, 1924, despite his deteriorating health, Hercílio Luz took part in a symbolic ceremony associated with the bridge, crossing a wooden replica built for the occasion. Around this time, he proposed renaming the structure the Hercílio Luz Bridge. He died on October 20, 1924, before construction was completed. Vice Governor Antônio Pereira da Silva e Oliveira succeeded him in office. The bridge was inaugurated on May 13, 1926.

== Death and posthumous honors ==
Hercílio Luz withdrew from the state government on May 9, 1924, during his third term, and the vice governor temporarily assumed the administration. Hercílio Luz died in Florianópolis on October 20, 1924, before completing his term and before witnessing the inauguration of the bridge that would bear his name. He was buried at the Cemitério do Senhor Jesus dos Passos in Florianópolis.

Article about Hercílio Luz's death, published in the newspaper A Cidade, of Blumenau, on October 26, 1924.

The bridge, initially planned as the Independence Bridge, was named in his honor. Construction had begun in November 1922 and was completed under his successor, Antônio Vicente Bulcão Viana. The bridge was inaugurated on May 13, 1926, becoming the first permanent connection between Santa Catarina Island and the mainland.

== Legacy and posthumous honors ==
Hercílio Luz's legacy is closely associated with the modernization of Santa Catarina and the construction of the bridge that bears his name. Inaugurated on May 13, 1926, the Hercílio Luz Bridge became one of Florianópolis's principal historic landmarks and established a permanent connection between the island and the mainland.

A monument honoring Hercílio Luz was inaugurated in Florianópolis on October 12, 1936, through an initiative of the Comissão Pró-Monumento Hercílio Luz. The ceremony constituted a public tribute to the former governor.

His name was also given to Florianópolis International Airport, Hercílio Luz Stadium in Itajaí, and Hercílio Luz Futebol Clube, a football club based in Tubarão. Streets, avenues, and public squares in Santa Catarina have also been named in his honor.

Political offices
Preceded by Antônio Moreira César	President of Santa Catarina; 1894–1898	Succeeded by Felipe Schmidt
Preceded by Lauro Müller	President of Santa Catarina; 1918–1922	Succeeded by Hercílio Luz
Preceded by Hercílio Luz	President of Santa Catarina; 1922–1924	Succeeded by Antônio Pereira da Silva e Oliveira
