= Hercílio Luz (disambiguation) =

Hercílio Luz was a Brazilian politician from Santa Catarina.

Hercílio Luz may also refer to:

- Hercílio Luz International Airport, an airport servicing Florianópolis, Brazil
- Hercílio Luz Bridge, a bridge between the island of Florianópolis and the Brazilian mainland
- Hercílio Luz Futebol Clube, a football club in Tubarão, Brazil
