= Vidal Ramos (politician) =

Brazilian politician

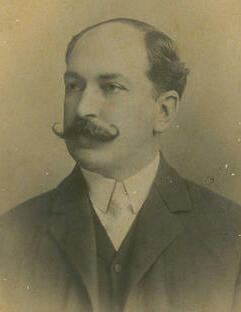

Member of the Federal Senate
- In office 1915–1929
- In office 1934–1937

Member of the Chamber of Deputies
- In office 1886–1889
- In office 1906–1911

Governor of Santa Catarina
- In office 3 March 1905 – 28 September 1906
- Preceded by: Lauro Müller
- Succeeded by: Abdon Batista
- In office 29 September 1910 – 28 October 1914
- Preceded by: Gustavo Richard
- Succeeded by: Filipe Schmidt

Member of the Legislative Assembly of Santa Catarina
- In office 1886–1887
- In office 1891–1891
- In office 1894–1897
- In office 1901–1903

Mayor of Lages
- In office 1895–1902
- Preceded by: João de Castro Nunes
- Succeeded by: Belizário José de Oliveira Ramos

Personal details
- Born: 24 October 1866 Lages, Brazil
- Died: 2 January 1954 (aged 87) Rio de Janeiro, Brazil
- Occupation: Farmer, politician

Vidal José de Oliveira Ramos Júnior (24 October 1866 — 2 January 1954) was a Brazilian politician who served as Governor of Santa Catarina.

== Biography ==
He served as a Provincial Deputy in Santa Catarina 1886–1887, and as State Deputy 1891, 1894–1897, and 1901–1903. He served as Governor of Santa Catarina from 3 March 1905 to 28 September 1906 and from 29 September 1910 to 28 October 1914. His governorship involved several education reforms.

He served as a Federal Deputy 1886–1889 and 1906–1911. He served as a Senator from 1915 until 1929, when he resigned to become federal deputy, and from 1934 to 1937.

He was a member of the Historical and Geographical Institute of Santa Catarina (pt).

He had fourteen children with Teresa Fiuza Ramos, including Brazil President Nereu Ramos, state deputy Hugo de Oliveira Ramos, Governor of Santa Catarina Celso Ramos, mayor of Florianópolis Mauro de Oliveira Ramos, and mayor of Lages Vidal Ramos Junior. His brother was provincial deputy Belisário Ramos, while his nephews were senator Saulo Ramos and governors Aristiliano Ramos (the aforementioned Belisário's son) and Cândido Ramos.

The city of Vidal Ramos was named after him.

== Bibliography ==
- Piazza, Walter: Dicionário Político Catarinense. Edição da Assembleia Legislativa do Estado de Santa Catarina, 1985.
- Ramos Filho, Celso: Coxilha Rica. Genealogia da Família Ramos. Florianópolis : Insular, 2002.
