= Comunidade Remanescente de Quilombo Invernada dos Negros =

The Invernada dos Negros Quilombo Remnant Community, or simply Invernada dos Negros, is a quilombo community recognized by Incra in 2008. It is located in the locality of Corredeira and Manoel Candido between the municipalities of Campos Novos and Abdon Batista in Santa Catarina. Previously recognized as quilombo territory by the Palmares Foundation on June 20, 2004.

The community faces territorial disputes with logging companies operating within its territory.

== History ==
Written records regarding the establishment of the quilombo community date back to 1876. On April 12, 1876, five enslaved people and three formerly enslaved women, namely Margarida, Damazia, and Joaquim, received a third of the land from the landowner Matheus José de Souza e Oliveira. The total inheritance amounted to approximately 8,000 hectares. In 1928, descendants of the heirs sued for the division of the property in the district of Campos Novos, at the request of lawyer Henrique Rupp Júnior, based on the argument of adverse possession. In 1940, the area was divided among 32 children and grandchildren of the first heirs, with another portion going to the lawyer. Each share of land divided among the families comprised 124.8 hectares, and lawyer Henrique received 3,993.6 hectares, 50% of the total original inheritance, due to legal fees and expenses.

The Invernada dos Negros community was granted the title following its publication in the Official Gazette of the Union, as per the wording on May 14, 2004:

IX. COMMUNITY OF THE HEIRS OF INVERNADA DOS NEGROS, lands of the former São João Farm, localities of Corredeira and Manoel Candido in the Municipality of Campos Novos in the State of Santa Catarina, registration no. 009, p. 10; — Palmares Cultural Foundation

In 2008, INCRA recognized the quilombola territory. The locality has houses, a chapel dedicated to Our Lady of Aparecida, and the local cemetery where the ancestors of the current local residents are buried. There was also the building that housed the José Faria Neto Basic Education School, which was destroyed on April 1, 2021.

Between September 17 and 18, 2014, the Monitoring Committee for the Policy of Regularization of Quilombola Territories in Santa Catarina was established, during which the first land ownership titles were delivered. In this context, it was defined that the community's territory comprises 7,950 hectares.

== Disputes over land ownership ==
On February 8, 2019, community leaders sought information from the federal prosecutor's office in the municipality of Caçador regarding a state court order for the repossession of land by the companies Iguaçu Celulose Papel and Imaribo Industrial e Comércio. The state judge ordered the immediate enforcement of the order by the General Command of the Military Police. However, due to the intervention of the Palmares Cultural Foundation, the court decision transferred responsibility to the Federal Court in the municipality of Joaçaba. The Public Prosecutor's Office petitioned for the suspension of the order, which was granted by the federal court; that is, the state court order was suspended by a decision of the federal court.

On May 10, 2019, a public hearing was held to discuss the land dispute surrounding the area. Representatives from INCRA, the Palmares Cultural Foundation, community representatives, and lawyers participated via videoconference.

An expert assessment to investigate possible irregularities in the division of the territory was scheduled for August 2019 by the federal court.

== Destruction of the quilombola school building ==
On April 1, 2021, the old building that housed the José Faria Neto Basic Education School was demolished, causing complaints from local residents, a police report being filed, an information note from the State Department of Education and from state deputy Luciane Carminatti. The school houses 3 classes in elementary school I and II and high school, totaling around 100 students including some elderly people.

According to the State Department of Education, in a statement on April 5, 2021:

The State Department of Education (SED) clarifies that it did not authorize the demolition of the old physical structure of the José Faria Neto State School in Campos Novos, which occurred last Thursday. The SED is investigating the information and documents regarding the demolition and, if necessary, will take appropriate measures. — State Department of Education of Santa Catarina

There was no warning about the destruction of the building; reports say that a machine arrived in the territory and destroyed the structure. The materials used in Quilombola education had disappeared.

== First National Award for Afro-Brazilian Cultural Expressions ==
A project carried out in the community won the first edition of the National Prize for Afro-Brazilian Cultural Expressions; the project involved the creation of a collection of black and white photographs and the production of a documentary with the same name as the community. After being shown in the south of the country, the exhibition went to the Museum of Abolition in Recife.
