= Aldeia Campista =

Brazilian neighborhood

Coordinates: 22°55′00″S 43°14′00″W

Aldeia Campista (Portuguese pronunciation: [awˈdejɐ kɐ̃ˈpiʃtɐ], "Camper Village") was a neighborhood in Rio de Janeiro, Brazil, close to contemporary Vila Isabel, Tijuca, Maracanã and Andaraí.

Located in the flat plain of the Grande Tijuca area of southernmost Zona Norte carioca neighbourhoods, once swampy, it was drained. Today most of the ancient Aldeia Campista was merged with Vila Isabel, in the area of it which is most close to Maracanã stadium, Tijuca and Andaraí. It is more close to the favelas of Mangueira and Morro dos Macacos than Tijuca National Park. A few schools, hospitals, small businesses and meet points for the Rio de Janeiro's youth are present there, close to a major shopping center in Tijuca and the Maracanã Stadium. Also close to the ancient Aldeia Campista is also Universidade Estadual do Rio de Janeiro (Rio de Janeiro's state University, most known by its acronym in Portuguese, UERJ), Vila Isabel Campus. Its standards of living are higher than the average of North Zone, nevertheless it is not an affluent area in the city or even popular outside Grande Tijuca.

In 1885, the Companhia de Fiação e Tecidos Confiança Industrial, a textile factory, was established in Aldeia Campista, between Vila Isabel and Andaraí. This factory played a significant role in the local economy and contributed to the area's development.

Common traditions found throughout Rio de Janeiro such as commemorating soccer victories and the carnival in the streets known as bloco de rua are also practised there. The region, as the whole middle class areas of Grande Tijuca, is mildly LGBT-friendly, although not representative when compared to Zona Sul, Zona Central and some areas of Niterói city (the closest to Grande Tijuca, Zona Central and Zona Sul in Rio de Janeiro metropolitan area) and Barra da Tijuca, but way more tolerant than other mostly residential neighbourhoods in Zona Norte, where discretion is highly advisable.

Rio's Metro stations close to what in the past was Aldeia Campista are Maracanã, São Francisco Xavier and Saens Peña (the latter two in Tijuca neighbourhood).
