= Vidal Ramos =

Coordinates: 27°23′S 49°22′W

- Municipality
- Flag Coat of arms
- Interactive map of Vidal Ramos
- Country: Brazil
- Region: South
- State: Santa Catarina
- Mesoregion: Vale do Itajai

Population (2020)
  - Total: 6,329
- Time zone: UTC -3
- Website: www.vidalramos.sc.gov.br

Vidal Ramos is a municipality in the state of Santa Catarina in the South region of Brazil.

== History ==
Vidal Ramos received city status by state law No. 272 in December 1956, with territory taken from the neighbouring municipality of Brusque.

It was named after the Governor of Santa Catarina of the same name.

== Geography ==
It is located at a latitude 27º23'31 "South and longitude 49º21'21" West, with an altitude of 370 meters. Its estimated population in 2020 was 6,329 inhabitants.

It has an area of 343.81 square kilometers.

== See also ==
- List of municipalities in Santa Catarina
