= MASC =

MASC may refer to:

- Mammary analogue secretory carcinoma
- Manually Annotated Sub-Corpus
- MASC (band), a South Korean boy band
- Master of Applied Science (MASc), an academic degree
- MASC, a song by Doja Cat and Teezo Touchdown from the album Scarlet (Doja Cat album)
