= Hercílio Luz Bridge =

Oldest bridge between the island of Florianópolis and the Brazilian mainland

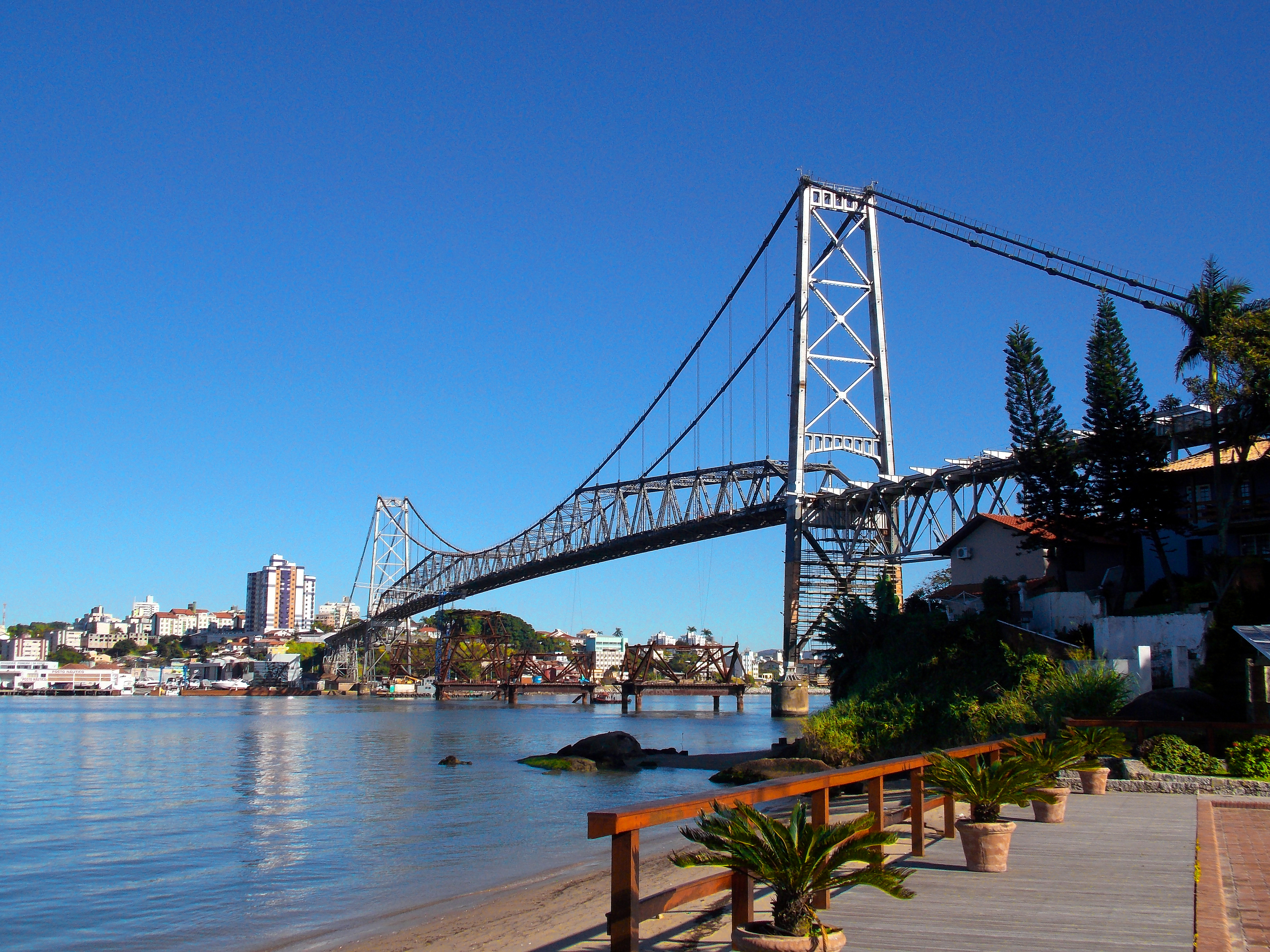
- The Bridge in 2014
- Coordinates: 27°35′36.60″S 48°33′53.64″W
- Crosses: Atlantic Ocean
- Locale: Florianópolis, Brazil

Characteristics
- Design: Suspension truss
- Total length: 819.5 m (2,689 ft)
- Height: 74 m (243 ft)
- Longest span: 340 m (1,115 ft)
- Clearance below: 43 m (141 ft)

History
- Construction start: November 14, 1922
- Construction end: May 13, 1926
- Opened: May 13, 1926 (general traffic); March 15, 1988 (Non motor traffic); December 30, 2019 (pedestrian traffic only); January 2020 (to public transport and emergency services); March 2020 (general traffic)
- Closed: 1982 (motor traffic); May 13, 1991 (non motor traffic)

Location
- Interactive map of Hercílio Luz Bridge

The Hercílio Luz Bridge, located in Florianópolis, the capital city of Santa Catarina State in southern Brazil, is the first bridge constructed to link the Island of Santa Catarina to the mainland.

It is the longest suspension bridge in Brazil. The central span was considered quite long (but not the longest, at 340 metres) at the time of its opening, and is still one of the 100 largest suspension bridges.

Construction commenced on 14 November 1922 with the bridge being inaugurated on May 13, 1926. The total length is 819.471 metres, with 259 metres of viaduct from the island, a central span of 339.471 metres and 221 metres of viaduct from the mainland.

It was closed to the public on May 13, 1991, and reopened after complete restoration on December 30, 2019.

== Historical background ==
The bridge was commissioned by Hercílio Luz, then governor of the state of Santa Catarina, to be the first permanent link between the island and the mainland. In addition to benefiting the then 40,000 residents of Florianópolis that were dependent on ferries to cross between the island and the mainland, Luz wanted to build the bridge to strengthen the position of Florianópolis as the state capital. At the time, other cities in the state considered the island to be too remote to be the administrative and political centre and consequently there was a movement to transfer the capital to Lages.

== Construction ==
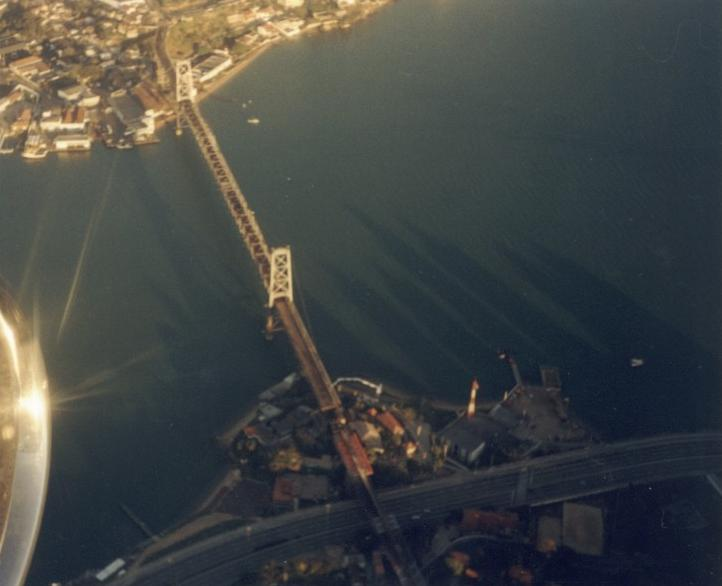
Aerial view of Hercílio Luz Bridge

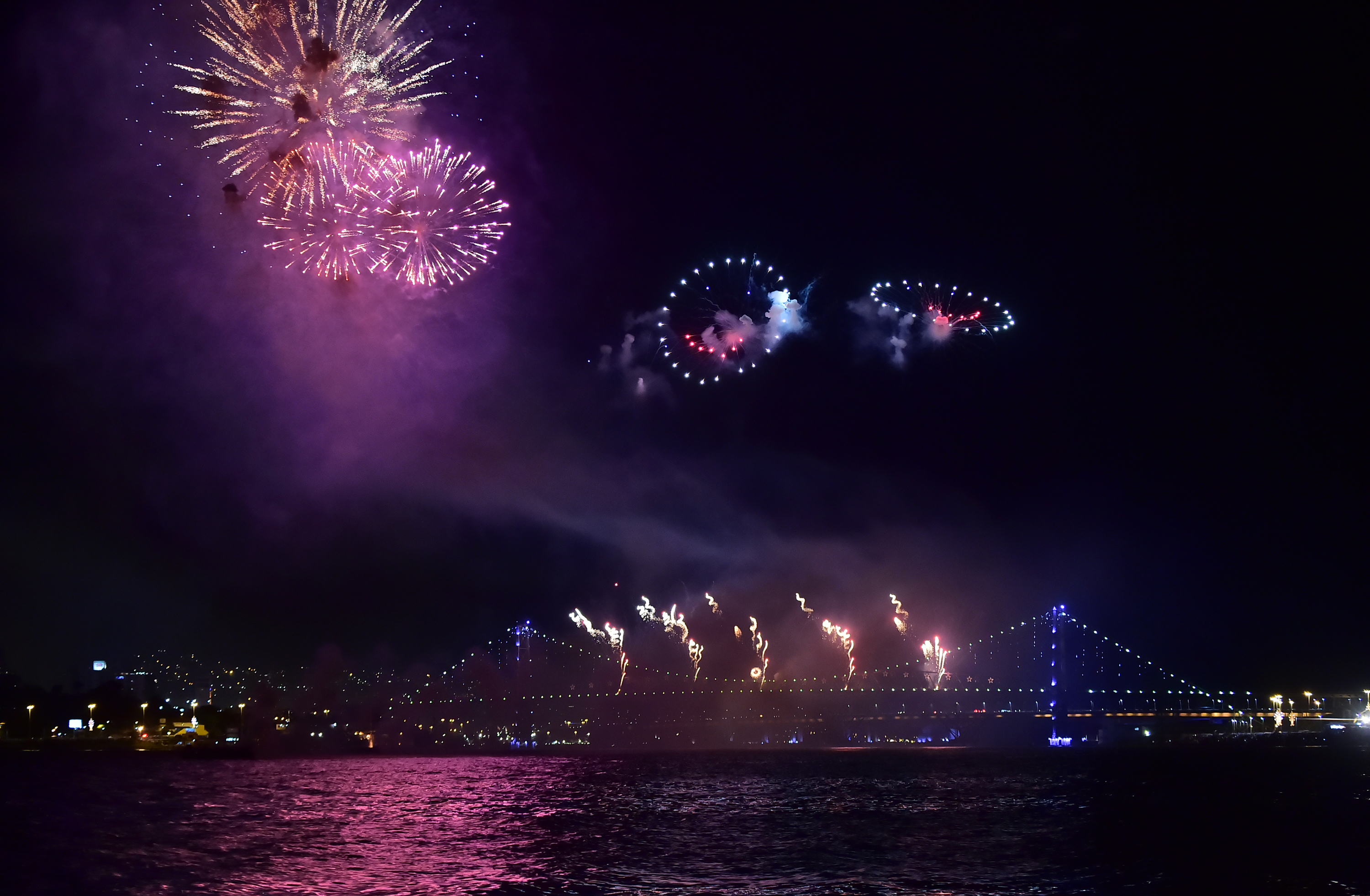
The Bridge during New Year's Eve

The bridge was designed by the firm of Robinson & Steinman, and was built by the American Bridge Company (ABC). All the material it used was brought from the United States.

It has the fairly unusual feature that the truss carrying the roadway (a continuous stiffening component) is above the roadway itself and meets up with the eyebar chains making it non-uniform in height. A similar bridge, the Walter Taylor Bridge, was built over the Brisbane River in Brisbane, Australia in 1936.

When completed the bridge was the longest eyebar suspension span in existence at that time. The 1,113’ long design features towers with rocker bearings. ABC brought to the project its own experimental heat-treated eyebars, and as project contractor pioneered stiffening techniques that saved materials and money while providing greater rigidity. Another bridge of similar design, the Silver Bridge over the Ohio River in the U.S., collapsed in 1967 due to a failure in one of the eyebars.

Luz didn't get to see his bridge completed, dying in 1924 twelve days after having inaugurated a wooden replica built in XV Square specifically for the symbolic act. Originally intended to be named the Independence Bridge, this was changed after Luz's death in a posthumous tribute. The bridge was inaugurated on May 13, 1926.

The steel structure weighs approximately 5,000 tons, and the foundations and pillars consumed 14,250 m³ of concrete. The two towers rise 74 metres from sea level, and the central span is 43 metres tall.

== Financing ==
From the beginning, the funding process was complicated. The first bank that had lent to the Catarina government failed. Thus, a new loan had to be obtained delaying the works. In addition, a manoeuvre of the U.S. bankers arranging the financing made the state of Santa Catarina liable for debts of the failed institution. In the end, the cost reached 14.478 trillion reis, ten times the original estimate and almost double the state budget at the time. The repayment of loans, made by U.S. banks, was completed in 1978, more than 50 years after the inauguration of the bridge.

== Closure ==
With two other bridges (Colombo Sales Bridge and Pedro Ivo Bridge) now linking the island to the mainland, the Hercílio Luz Bridge was closed in 1982 due to safety concerns. It reopened again on March 15, 1988, to pedestrian traffic, bicycles, motorcycles and horse-drawn vehicles only. It closed completely on July 4, 1991, after a report analyzing the feasibility of reopening the bridge to vehicular traffic was presented in February 1990. In 1997 the landmark bridge was declared an historical and artistic monument.

Restoration of the bridge was investigated by a partnership involving the Federal Government, State Government, and the Municipality of Florianópolis. Submission of restoration plans occurred in mid-2013.

== Restoration ==
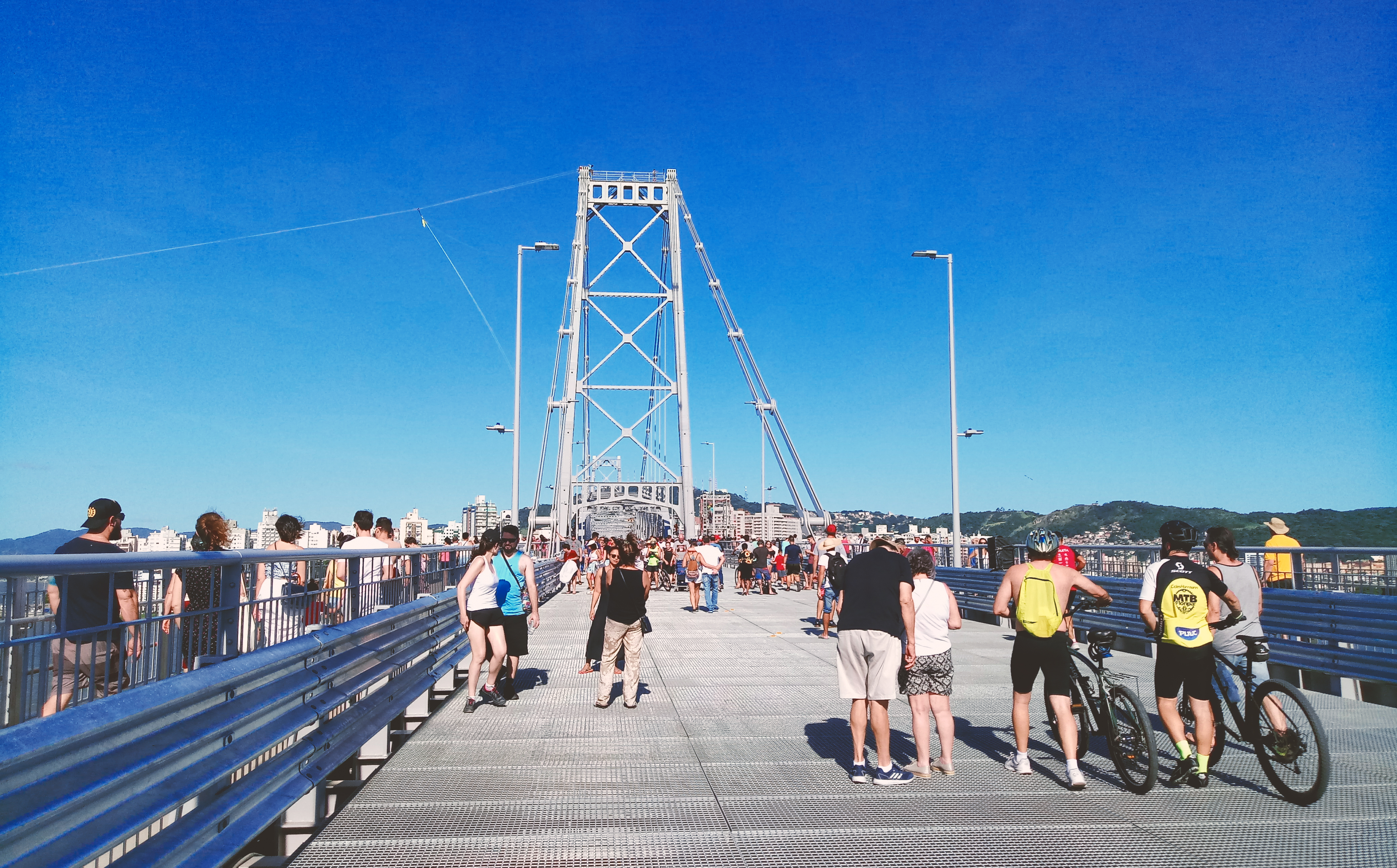
Reopening in January 2020.\

The bridge during repair work in August 2015.\

Restoration work on the approach spans began in 2006, and was completed in 2008 at a cost of R$21,000,000.

Restoration work on the main span was supposed to begin in 2009, but after delays by the contractor the contract was split into two parts. Rehabilitation of the bridge was started in 2016 by the Portuguese company Teixeira Duarte. Four midspan piers and an under-deck truss were constructed to support the bridge deck during the restoration. The restoration was extensive, involving the replacement of the entire eyebar suspension system, and the pin joints at the bases of the towers. As of reopening, the bridge carries one traffic lane in each direction, as well as bicycle and pedestrian paths. Several additions have been made to the original contracted cost. The final cost of the restoration is currently expected to be R$333,000,000

The first eyebar was replaced on March 21, 2018 and the bridge's re-opening was on December 30, 2019, although some of the temporary supporting structures will not be removed until March 2020.

In December 2019, the state government confirmed the reopening of traffic on the bridge, which occurred on 30 December 2019. On that day, more than 200,000 people attended the event celebrating its reopening, with the main attraction of the celebration being bungee jumping off of the bridge. The end of construction, however, will occur in 2020, with the removal of auxiliary structures over the central bridge span, alongside the installation of scenic lighting.

Initially, only pedestrians and cyclists were able to cross the bridge, but in January 2020, buses and emergency vehicles were allowed to begin crossing. In March, the bridge was opened to all traffic.
