= Desterro =

Desterro Desterro
- Municipality
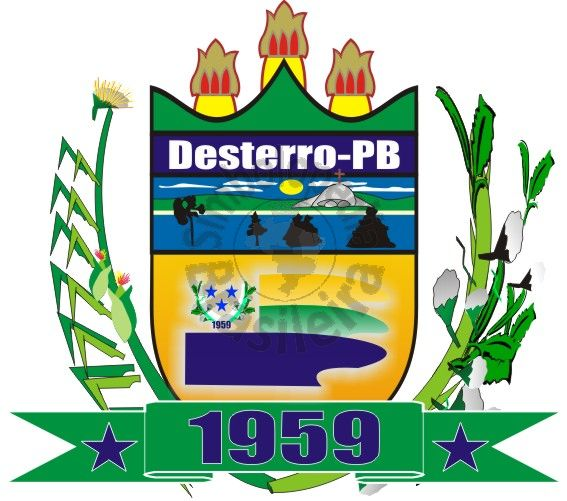
- Flag Coat of arms

- Location in Brazil
- Coordinates: 7.29083°S 37.0939°W
- Country: Brazil
- Region: Northeast
- State: Paraíba
- Mesoregion: Sertão Paraibano

Population (2020)
  - Total: 8,315
- Time zone: UTC−3 (BRT)

Desterro is a municipality in the state of Paraíba in the Northeast Region of Brazil.

== See also ==
- List of municipalities in Santa Catarina
