= Lauro Müller =

Brazilian politician, diplomat and military engineer

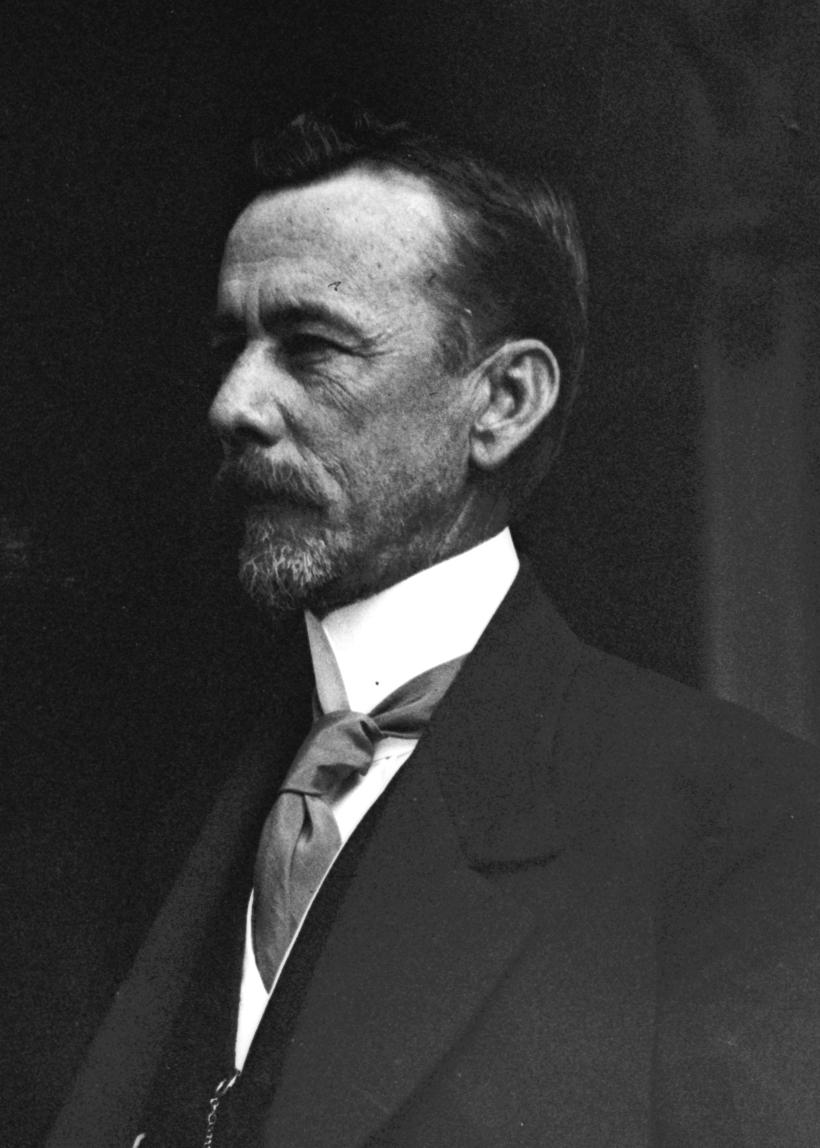

Minister of Foreign Affairs
- In office 14 February 1912 – 7 May 1917
- President: Hermes da Fonseca; Venceslau Brás
- Preceded by: Baron of Rio Branco
- Succeeded by: Nilo Peçanha
Other offices held
Minister of Transport
In office 15 November 1902 – 15 November 1906
President	Rodrigues Alves
Preceded by	Antônio Augusto da Silva
Succeeded by	Miguel Calmon
President of Santa Catarina
In office 28 September 1902 – 6 March 1905
Vice President	Vidal Ramos
Preceded by	Filipe Schmidt
Succeeded by	Vidal Ramos
In office 2 December 1889 – 28 December 1891; On leave: 29 June 1890 – 10 November 1891
Vice President	Gustavo Richard
Preceded by	Oliveira Belo II
Succeeded by	Manuel Joaquim Machado
Senator for Santa Catarina
In office 28 September 1917 – 30 June 1926
Preceded by	Abdon Batista
Succeeded by	Pereira Oliveira
In office 2 May 1907 – 31 December 1911
Preceded by	Gustavo Richard
Succeeded by	Hercílio Luz
In office 3 May 1900 – 30 December 1902
Preceded by	Raulino Horn
Succeeded by	Filipe Schmidt
Member of the Chamber of Deputies
In office 15 November 1890 – 22 November 1899
Constituency	Santa Catarina

Personal details
- Born: 8 November 1863 Itajaí, Santa Catarina, Brazil
- Died: 30 June 1926 (aged 62) Rio de Janeiro, Federal District, Brazil

Lauro Severiano Müller (8 November 1863 – 30 July 1926) was a Brazilian politician, diplomat, and military engineer. Responsible for the transition of Santa Catarina from a province to a state, he is also recognised as one of those who helped achieve the Brazilian diplomatic victory over Bolivia through the Treaty of Petrópolis, which allowed for the purchase of Acre and its incorporation into Brazil.

Müller occupied the 34th chair of the Brazilian Academy of Letters from 1912 until his death in 1926.

== Biography ==
Born in Itajaí, Santa Catarina, he was the son of the German immigrants Peter Müller and Anna Michels, originally from the Rhineland. On his mother's side, his first cousin was Filipe Schmidt, who also served two terms as President of Santa Catarina. A passionate follower of Benjamin Constant's positivism in his youth, he embarked on a military career in his native province after a brief stint in a merchant's office.

His political career began in 1889, when the first President of Brazil, Deodoro da Fonseca, made him President of Santa Catarina and charged him with organising the province that had been transformed into a state.

Later, he served as a federal deputy, senator (1899–1926), member of the Academy of Letters (1912–1926), and minister of state. He carried out great reforms while holding the ministerial portfolios of Industry, Transport and Public Works, during the presidency of Rodrigues Alves. As Minister of Foreign Affairs a post he assumed in 1912 upon the untimely death of the Barão do Rio Branco, he pursued economic integration with Argentina and Chile. He was forced to resign in 1917 because Brazil had entered World War I on the side of the Allies, and anti-German sentiment created opposition to him due to his German roots. He was elected President of Santa Catarina again in 1918, but preferred to remain a senator.

During an official visit to the U.S. as Minister of Foreign Affairs, he was offered the title of Doctor Honoris Causa by Harvard University. He was also made an honorary samurai on an official visit to Japan.

The positions he held in his long political career include: Member of the Constitutional Assembly Member of Congress Governor of the State Minister of Public Works General of the Army Minister of Foreign Affairs Senator of the Republic

He became popular for his important public works, such as the construction of Rio de Janeiro's Avenida Central, today Avenida Rio Branco, and improvements to that city's port. He died in Rio in 1926.

Preceded by Augusto Fausto de Sousa (last Imperial governor)	President of Santa Catarina; 1889 — 1891	Succeeded by Manuel Joaquim Machado
Preceded by Filipe Schmidt	President of Santa Catarina; 1902 — 1906	Succeeded by Gustavo Richard
Preceded by José Maria da Silva Paranhos, Jr.	Brazilian Academy of Letters - Occupant of the 34th chair 1912 — 1926	Succeeded by Francisco de Aquino Correia
