= Abdon Batista =

- municipality
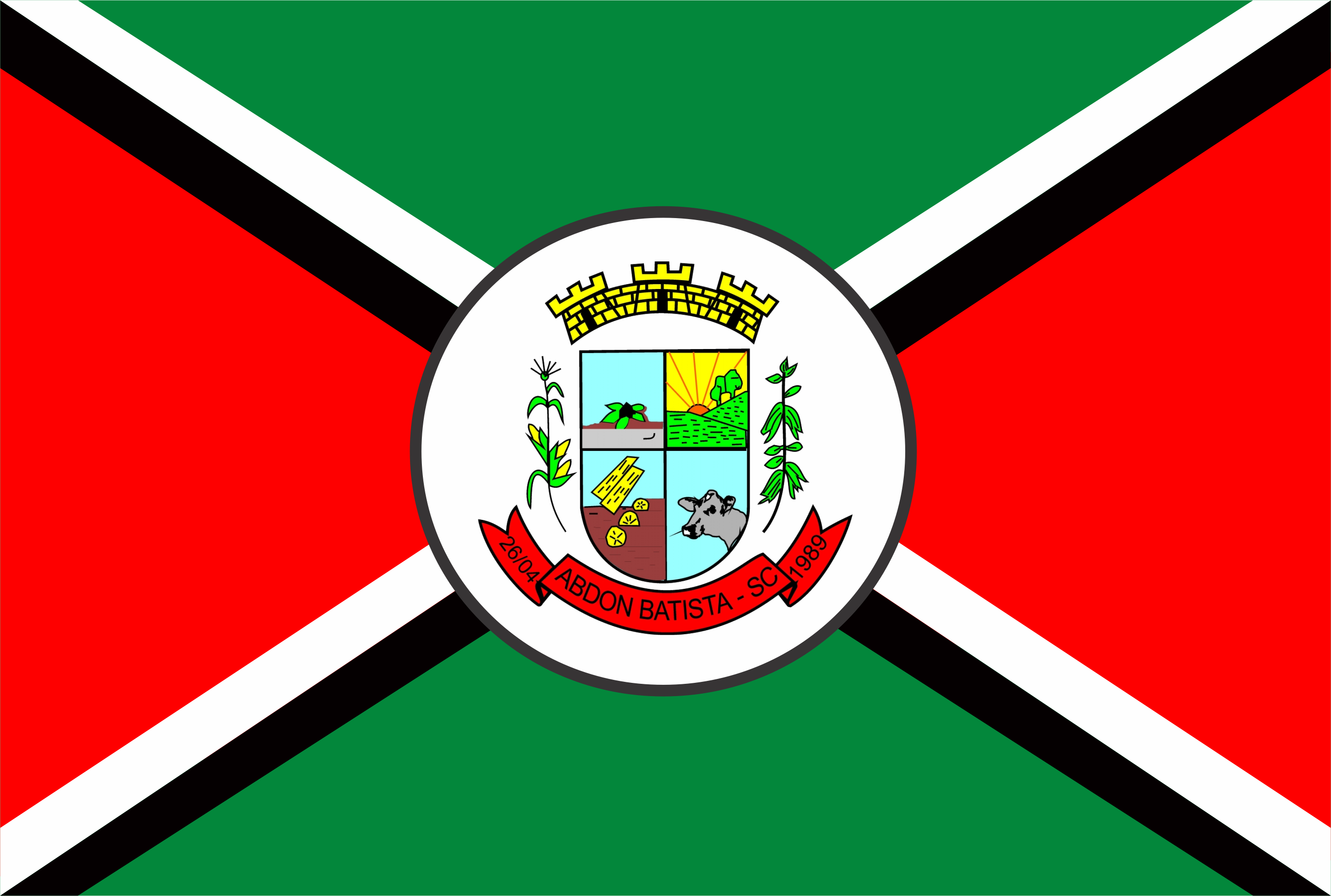
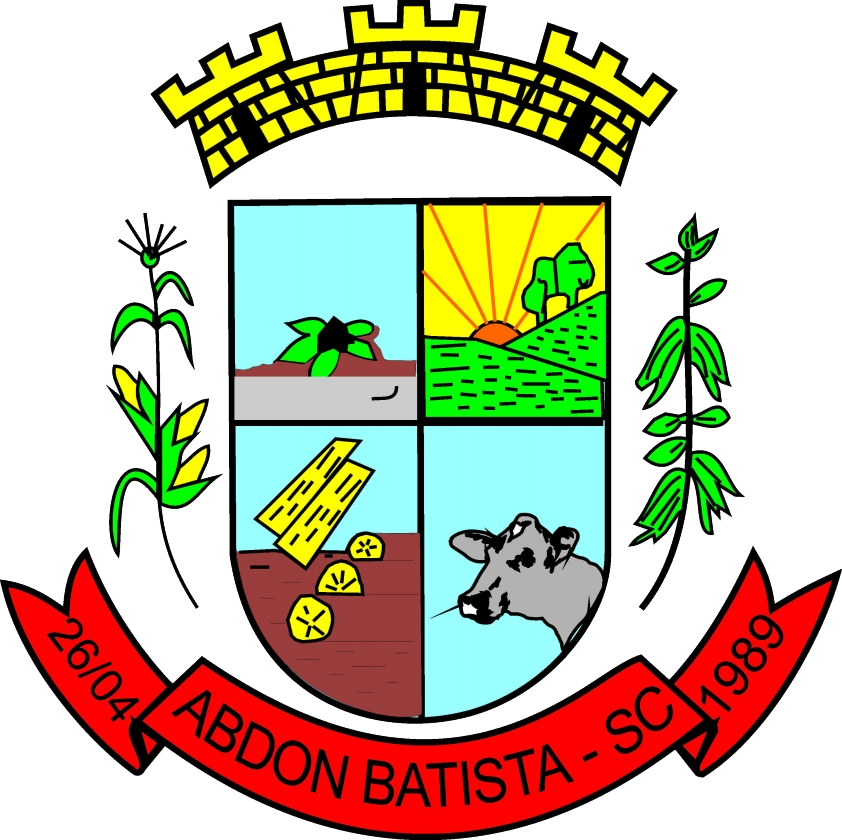
- Flag Coat of arms
- Motto: Work, culture and leisure (Trabalho, cultura e lazer)
- Location of Abdon Batista

- Location within Brazil
- Coordinates: 27°36′38″S 51°01′22″W
- Country: Brazil
- Region: South
- State: (Santa Catarina (state)) Santa Catarina
- Founded: April 26, 1989

Government
  - Mayor: Luis Antônio Zanchett

Area
  - Total: 235.6 km^{2} (91.0 sq mi)
- Elevation: 716 m (2,349 ft)

Population (2020)
  - Total: 2,548
  - Density: 10.3/km^{2} (27/sq mi)
- Time zone: UTC−3 (BRT)
- HDI (2000): 0.774
- Website: www.abdonbatista.sc.gov.br

Abdon Batista is a Brazilian municipality in the state of Santa Catarina.
