= List of municipalities in Rondônia =

This is a list of the municipalities in the state of Rondônia (RO), located in the North Region of Brazil. Rondônia is divided into 52 municipalities, which are grouped into 6 immediate regions, which are grouped into 2 intermediate regions. Of the 52 municipalities, the largest by population is its capital, Porto Velho, while the smallest is Pimenteiras do Oeste which only has 2,191 inhabitants.

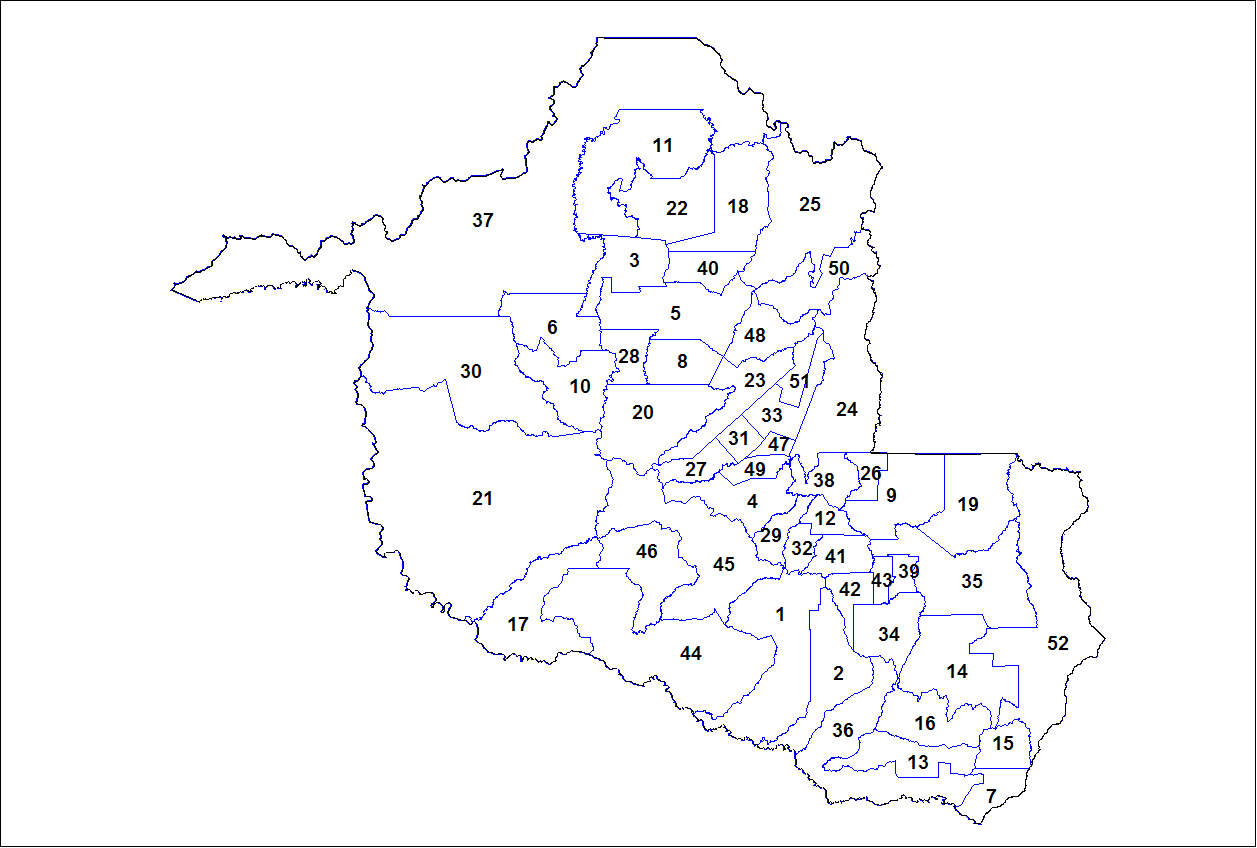
Municipalities of Rondônia, Brazil

== Municipalities ==
† State capital

Municipalities in Rondônia
Name	Immediate region	Intermediate region	Population (2022 census)	Population (2010 census)	Population change	Land area (km²)	Population density (2022)
Alta Floresta d'Oeste	Cacoal	Ji-Paraná	21,494	24,392	−11.9%	7,067.0	3.0/km^{2}
Alto Alegre dos Parecis	Cacoal	Ji-Paraná	11,479	12,816	−10.4%	3,958.3	2.9/km^{2}
Alto Paraíso	Ariquemes	Porto Velho	16,320	17,135	−4.8%	2,651.8	6.2/km^{2}
Alvorada d'Oeste	Ji-Paraná	Ji-Paraná	13,117	16,853	−22.2%	3,029.2	4.3/km^{2}
Ariquemes	Ariquemes	Porto Velho	96,833	90,353	+7.2%	4,426.6	21.9/km^{2}
Buritis	Ariquemes	Porto Velho	27,992	32,383	−13.6%	3,265.8	8.6/km^{2}
Cabixi	Vilhena	Ji-Paraná	5,351	6,313	−15.2%	1,314.4	4.1/km^{2}
Cacaulândia	Ariquemes	Porto Velho	4,150	5,736	−27.6%	1,961.8	2.1/km^{2}
Cacoal	Cacoal	Ji-Paraná	86,887	78,574	+10.6%	3,792.8	22.9/km^{2}
Campo Novo de Rondônia	Ariquemes	Porto Velho	8,844	12,665	−30.2%	3,442.0	2.6/km^{2}
Candeias do Jamari	Porto Velho	Porto Velho	22,310	19,779	+12.8%	6,843.9	3.3/km^{2}
Castanheiras	Cacoal	Ji-Paraná	3,233	3,575	−9.6%	892.8	3.6/km^{2}
Cerejeiras	Vilhena	Ji-Paraná	15,890	17,029	−6.7%	2,783.3	5.7/km^{2}
Chupinguaia	Vilhena	Ji-Paraná	9,324	8,301	+12.3%	5,126.7	1.8/km^{2}
Colorado do Oeste	Vilhena	Ji-Paraná	15,663	18,591	−15.7%	1,451.1	10.8/km^{2}
Corumbiara	Vilhena	Ji-Paraná	7,519	8,783	−14.4%	3,060.3	2.5/km^{2}
Costa Marques	Ji-Paraná	Ji-Paraná	12,627	13,678	−7.7%	4,987.2	2.5/km^{2}
Cujubim	Ariquemes	Porto Velho	14,863	15,854	−6.3%	3,863.9	3.8/km^{2}
Espigão d'Oeste	Cacoal	Ji-Paraná	29,414	28,729	+2.4%	4,518.0	6.5/km^{2}
Governador Jorge Teixeira	Jaru	Porto Velho	8,001	10,512	−23.9%	5,067.4	1.6/km^{2}
Guajará-Mirim	Porto Velho	Porto Velho	39,387	41,656	−5.4%	24,855.8	1.6/km^{2}
Itapuã do Oeste	Porto Velho	Porto Velho	8,548	8,566	−0.2%	4,081.6	2.1/km^{2}
Jaru	Jaru	Porto Velho	50,591	52,005	−2.7%	2,944.1	17.2/km^{2}
Ji-Paraná	Ji-Paraná	Ji-Paraná	124,333	116,610	+6.6%	6,896.7	18.0/km^{2}
Machadinho d'Oeste	Jaru	Porto Velho	30,707	31,135	−1.4%	8,509.3	3.6/km^{2}
Ministro Andreazza	Cacoal	Ji-Paraná	6,466	10,352	−37.5%	798.1	8.1/km^{2}
Mirante da Serra	Ji-Paraná	Ji-Paraná	9,235	11,878	−22.3%	1,191.9	7.7/km^{2}
Monte Negro	Ariquemes	Porto Velho	11,548	14,091	−18.0%	1,931.4	6.0/km^{2}
Nova Brasilândia d'Oeste	Cacoal	Ji-Paraná	15,679	19,874	−21.1%	1,155.4	13.6/km^{2}
Nova Mamoré	Porto Velho	Porto Velho	25,444	22,546	+12.9%	10,071.7	2.5/km^{2}
Nova União	Ji-Paraná	Ji-Paraná	6,200	7,493	−17.3%	807.1	7.7/km^{2}
Novo Horizonte do Oeste	Cacoal	Ji-Paraná	7,667	10,240	−25.1%	843.4	9.1/km^{2}
Ouro Preto do Oeste	Ji-Paraná	Ji-Paraná	35,044	37,928	−7.6%	1,969.9	17.8/km^{2}
Parecis	Cacoal	Ji-Paraná	4,125	4,810	−14.2%	2,548.7	1.6/km^{2}
Pimenta Bueno	Cacoal	Ji-Paraná	35,079	33,822	+3.7%	6,240.9	5.6/km^{2}
Pimenteiras do Oeste	Vilhena	Ji-Paraná	2,156	2,315	−6.9%	6,014.7	0.4/km^{2}
Porto Velho†	Porto Velho	Porto Velho	460,434	428,527	+7.4%	34,096.4	13.5/km^{2}
Presidente Médici	Ji-Paraná	Ji-Paraná	19,327	22,319	−13.4%	1,758.5	11.0/km^{2}
Primavera de Rondônia	Cacoal	Ji-Paraná	3,076	3,524	−12.7%	605.7	5.1/km^{2}
Rio Crespo	Ariquemes	Porto Velho	3,471	3,316	+4.7%	1,717.6	2.0/km^{2}
Rolim de Moura	Cacoal	Ji-Paraná	56,406	50,648	+11.4%	1,457.9	38.7/km^{2}
Santa Luzia d'Oeste	Cacoal	Ji-Paraná	7,419	8,886	−16.5%	1,197.8	6.2/km^{2}
São Felipe d'Oeste	Cacoal	Ji-Paraná	5,258	6,018	−12.6%	541.6	9.7/km^{2}
São Francisco do Guaporé	Ji-Paraná	Ji-Paraná	16,286	16,035	+1.6%	10,959.8	1.5/km^{2}
São Miguel do Guaporé	Ji-Paraná	Ji-Paraná	21,635	21,828	−0.9%	8,007.9	2.7/km^{2}
Seringueiras	Ji-Paraná	Ji-Paraná	11,171	11,629	−3.9%	3,773.5	3.0/km^{2}
Teixeirópolis	Ji-Paraná	Ji-Paraná	4,256	4,888	−12.9%	460.0	9.3/km^{2}
Theobroma	Jaru	Porto Velho	8,113	10,649	−23.8%	2,197.4	3.7/km^{2}
Urupá	Ji-Paraná	Ji-Paraná	10,725	12,974	−17.3%	831.9	12.9/km^{2}
Vale do Anari	Jaru	Porto Velho	7,788	9,384	−17.0%	3,135.1	2.5/km^{2}
Vale do Paraíso	Ji-Paraná	Ji-Paraná	6,479	8,210	−21.1%	965.7	6.7/km^{2}
Vilhena	Vilhena	Ji-Paraná	95,832	76,202	+25.8%	11,519.0	8.3/km^{2}
Rondônia	—	—	1,581,196	1,562,409	+1.20%	237,590.9	6.7/km^{2}
North Region	—	—	17,354,884	15,864,454	+9.39%	3,853,575.6	4.5/km^{2}
Brazil	—	—	203,080,756	190,755,799	+6.46%	8,502,728.3	23.9/km^{2}

== See also ==
- Geography of Brazil
