= Castañeira =

Castañeira is a surname. Notable people with the surname include:

- Hilda Nélida Castañeira (1926–2007), Argentine politician
- Manuela Castañeira (born 1984), Argentine sociologist, activist and politician

== See also ==
- Castañeiras, a village in Balboa, Spain
- Castanheira (disambiguation)
