= Castanheira =

Castanheira (Portuguese: chestnut tree) may refer to:

== Places ==
=== In Brazil ===
- Castanheira, Mato Grosso, a municipality in the State of Mato Grosso
- Castanheira, Belém, a neighbourhood of the city of Belém, in the State of Pará

=== In Portugal ===
- Castanheira (Guarda), a civil parish in the municipality of Guarda
- Castanheira (Mogadouro), a civil parish in the municipality of Mogadouro
- Castanheira (Paredes de Coura), a civil parish in the municipality of Paredes de Coura
- Castanheira (Trancoso), a parish in Trancoso Municipality, Portugal
- Castanheira, a locality of the civil parish of Cós, in the municipality of Alcobaça
- Castanheira de Pera, a municipality in the district of Leiria
- Castanheira de Pera (parish), a civil parish in the municipality of Castanheira de Pera
- Castanheira do Ribatejo e Cachoeiras, a civil parish in the municipality of Vila Franca de Xira
- Castanheira do Vouga, a civil parish in the municipality of Águeda

== People ==
- Adriano Castanheira (born 1993), Portuguese footballer
- António Castanheira Neves (born 1929), Portuguese legal philosopher
- Bruno Castanheira (1977–2014), Portuguese cyclist
- Bruno Junichi Suzuki Castanheira (born 1990), Brazilian footballer
- Dylan Castanheira (born 1995), American soccer player/footballer
- Dora Castanheira (born 1960), Brazilian volleyball player
- Mariana Castanheira, Brazilian microbiologist
- Telmo Castanheira (born 1992), Portuguese footballer
- Vítor Castanheira (born 1977), Portuguese footballer

== See also ==
- Castanheiras
- Castanheiro (disambiguation)
