= Castanheiras =

Municipality in Rondônia, Brazil

- Municipality
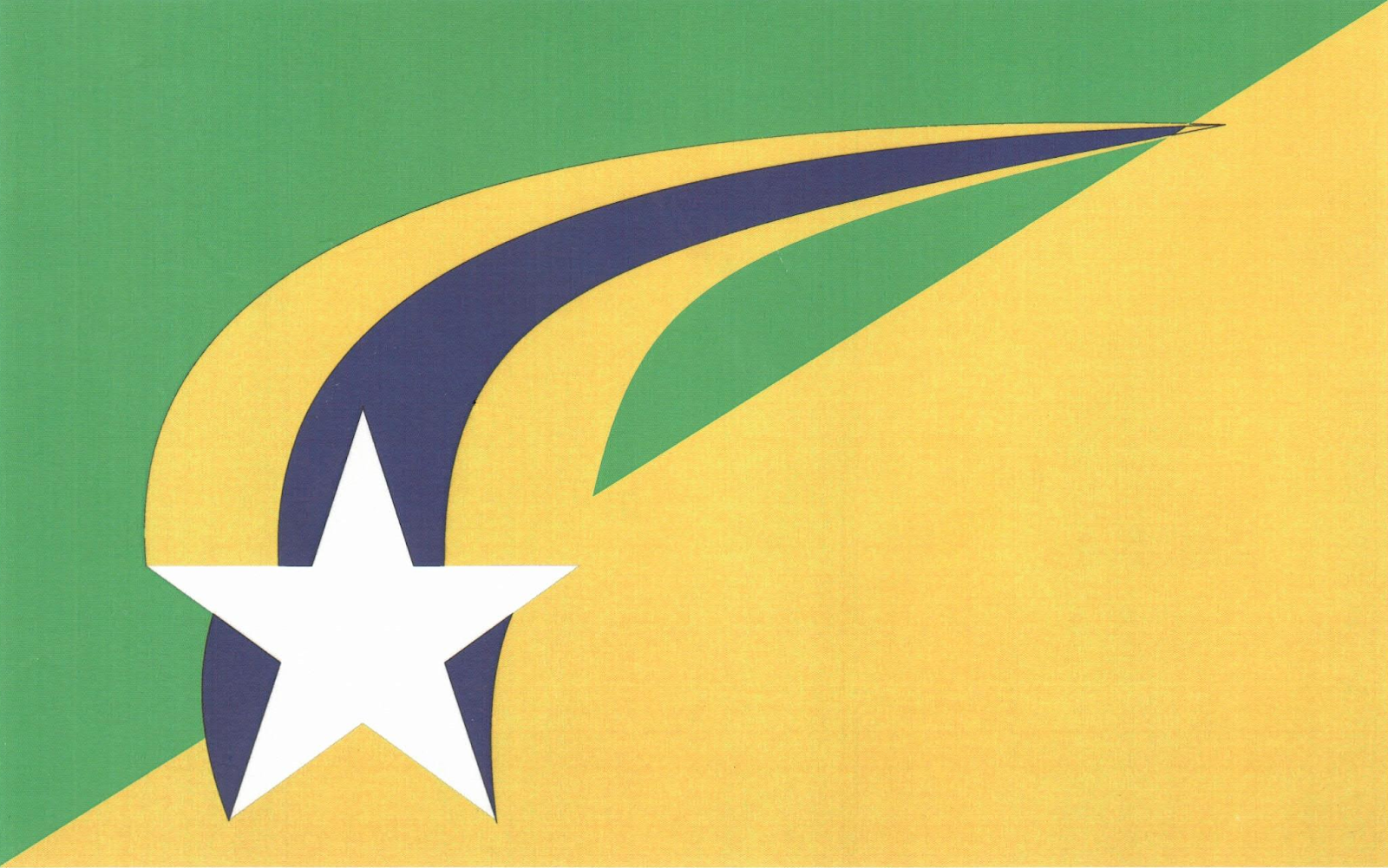
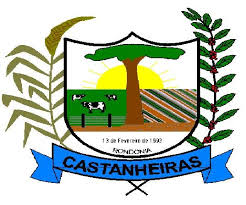
- Flag Coat of arms

- Location in Rondônia state

- Location in Brazil
- Coordinates: 11°25′3″S 61°56′19″W
- Country: Brazil
- Region: North
- State: Rondônia

Area
  - Total: 893 km^{2} (345 sq mi)

Population (2020)
  - Total: 2,987
  - Density: 3.34/km^{2} (8.66/sq mi)
- Time zone: UTC−4 (AMT)
- Website: www.castanheiras.ro.gov.br

Castanheiras (Portuguese meaning chestnut) is a municipality located in the Brazilian state of Rondônia. Its population was 2,987 (2020) and its area is 893 km^{2}.

== See also ==
- Castanheira
- Castanheiro (disambiguation)
- List of municipalities in Rondônia
