= Theobroma (disambiguation) =

Theobroma (Theobroma spp) is the genus of plant labelled in Latin as the "food of the gods" in 1753 by Carl Linnaeus.

Theobroma may also refer to:

- Theobroma, Rondônia, a municipality located in the Brazilian state of Rondônia.
- Theobroma oil, also known as cocoa butter, extracted from Theobroma spp seeds.
