= Nova União =

Nova União may refer to:

- Nova União, Minas Gerais, municipality in Brazil
- Nova União, Rondônia, municipality in Brazil
- Nova União (mixed martial arts), Brazilian jiu-jitsu and mixed martial arts team
