= Rone Carlos =

Brazilian footballer

Personal information
- Full name: Rone Carlos de Paula
- Date of birth: 15 August 1995 (age 31)
- Place of birth: Alvorada d'Oeste, Brazil
- Height: 1.80 m (5 ft 11 in)
- Position: Forward

Team information
- Current team: São José-SP

Youth career
- Alvorada
- 2013: Manthiqueira
- 2014: Tiradentes-CE

Senior career*
Years	Team	Apps	(Gls)
2014	Tiradentes-CE	0	(0)
2017–2020	Cascavel CR	32	(9)
2017	→ Santa Helena (loan)	3	(0)
2018–2019	→ Kalamata (loan)	16	(3)
2020	Chapecoense	6	(0)
2020–2021	CSA	15	(1)
2021	Santo André	10	(0)
2021	Santa Cruz	2	(0)
2021	Brasil de Pelotas	9	(0)
2022	Azuriz	16	(1)
2023	Brasil de Pelotas	6	(1)
2023–2024	Portuguesa	8	(0)
2024	→ São José-SP (loan)	6	(0)
2025–	São José-SP	0	(0)
- * Club domestic league appearances and goals as of 16:45, 16 June 2024 (UTC)

Rone Carlos de Paula (born 15 August 1995), known as Rone Carlos or just Rone, is a Brazilian footballer who plays as a forward for São José-SP.

== Club career ==
Born in Alvorada d'Oeste, Rondônia, Rone began his career with hometown side Alvorada, and subsequently played for Manthiqueira and Tiradentes-CE as a youth. After making his senior debut with the latter side in the 2014 Copa Fares Lopes, he returned to his hometown and went on to play amateur football for two years; at that time, he was known as Birinha.

Rone joined Cascavel CR at the start of the 2017 season, and also had loan spells at Santa Helena and Greek side Kalamata. Back to Cascavel for the 2020 campaign, he scored five goals in the year's Campeonato Paranaense before moving to Série B side Chapecoense on 9 March 2020.

Rarely used by Chape, Rone signed for fellow second division side CSA on 9 October 2020. He agreed to a contract with Santo André the following 4 February, before moving to Santa Cruz on 16 July 2021.

On 24 August 2021, after just two matches for Santa, Rone signed a contract with Brasil de Pelotas. The following January, after suffering relegation, he was included in Azuriz's squad for the 2022 season.

In December 2022, Rone returned to Brasil, with the club now in the Série D. On 4 May 2023, he signed a contract with Portuguesa until the end of the year.

On 15 April 2024, Rone was loaned to São José-SP until October.

== Career statistics ==
As of 16 June 2024

Club	Season	League			State League		Cup		Continental		Other		Total	
Club	Season	Division	Apps	Goals	Apps	Goals	Apps	Goals	Apps	Goals	Apps	Goals	Apps	Goals
Tiradentes-CE	2014	Cearense	—		0	0	—		—		2 (Note: Appearance(s) in Copa Fares Lopes)	0	3	0
Cascavel CR	2017	Paranaense Série Prata	—		8	1	—		—		—		8	1
Cascavel CR	2018	Paranaense Série Prata	—		14	3	—		—		—		14	3
Cascavel CR	2020	Paranaense	—		10	5	—		—		—		10	5
Cascavel CR	Total		—		32	9	—		—		—		32	9
Santa Helena (loan)	2017	Goiano 2ª Divisão	—		3	0	—		—		—		3	0
Kalamata (loan)	2018–19	Gamma Ethniki	16	3	—		—		—		1 (Note: Appearance(s) in promotion play-offs)	0	17	3
Chapecoense	2020	Série B	3	0	3	0	—		—		—		6	0
CSA	2020	Série B	15	1	—		—		—		1 (Note: Appearance(s) in Copa do Nordeste)	0	16	1
Santo André	2021	Série D	0	0	10	0	—		—		—		10	0
Santa Cruz	2021	Série C	2	0	—		—		—		—		2	0
Brasil de Pelotas	2021	Série B	9	0	—		—		—		—		9	0
Azuriz	2022	Série D	11	1	5	0	4	0	—		—		20	1
Brasil de Pelotas	2023	Série D	0	0	6	1	2	0	—		—		8	1
Portuguesa	2023	Paulista	—		0	0	—		—		10 (Note: Appearance(s) in Copa Paulista)	4	10	4
Portuguesa	2024	Paulista	—		8	0	—		—		—		8	0
Portuguesa	Total		—		8	0	—		—		10	4	18	4
São José-SP (loan)	2024	Série D	6	0	—		—		—		—		6	0
Career total			67	5	67	10	6	0	0	0	14	4	154	19
