= Vale do Paraíso =

Vale do Paraíso may refer to the following places:

- Vale do Paraíso, Rondônia, a municipality in Brazil
- Vale do Paraíso (Azambuja), a parish in Portugal
