= Cacaulândia =

- Municipality
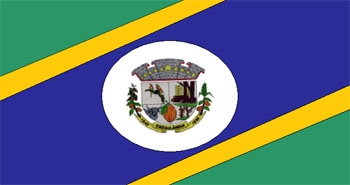
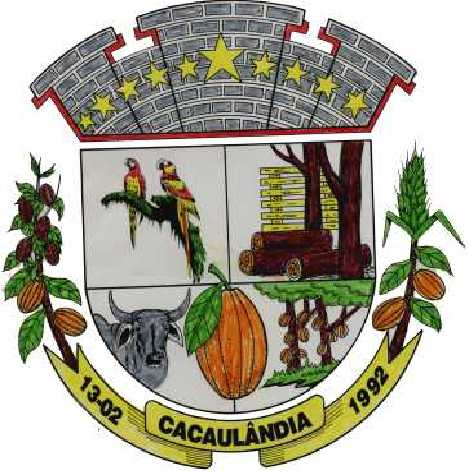
- Flag Coat of arms

- Municipal location within the State of Rondônia

- Location in Brazil
- Coordinates: 10.33917°S 62.89528°W
- Country: Brazil
- State: Rondônia
- Municipality: Cacaulândia

Government
  - Mayor: Edir Alquieri

Area
  - Total: 1,961.778 km^{2} (757.447 sq mi)
- Elevation: 142 m (466 ft)

Population (2020)
  - Total: 6,269
  - Density: 3.196/km^{2} (8.276/sq mi)
- Demonym: cacaulandense
- Time zone: UTC−4 (AMT)
- Website: www.cacaulandia.ro.gov.br

Cacaulândia is a municipality in the Brazilian state of Rondônia. It has an area of 1,961.778 square kilometres (757.447 sq mi). It has a tropical savanna climate. As of 2019 the estimated population was 6230.

== Geography ==
Cacaulândia is in the state of Rondônia, Brazil. It has an area of 1,961.778 square kilometres (757.447 sq mi) as of 2018. The elevation above sea level is about 142 metres (466 ft).

=== Climate ===
The Köppen climate type is Aw : Tropical savanna climate. The average annual temperature is 24 °C (75 °F). The average annual rainfall is 1,890 millimetres (74 in).

== History ==
Cacaulândia has its origins in a Northwest Brazil Integrated Development Program (Polonoroeste) project to support farmers in the region through a Núcleo Urbano de Apoio Rural (NUAR: Urban Center of Rural Support). It was named Cacaulândia because it was a large cocoa producing region. 40 hectares (99 acres) of land were donated for the NUAR from lots at the intersection of TB-65 with Line C-15. The region was split off from the municipality of Ariquemes on 13 February 1992, and became a separate municipality and district named Cacaulândia. As of 2007 it remained a municipality with one district.

== Demographics ==
The population in the 2010 census was 5,736. The estimated population as of 2020 was 6,269. Population density as of 2010 was 2.92 inhabitants per square kilometre (7.6/sq mi). As of 2010, 95.5% of the population had attended school between the ages of 6 and 14. Also as of 2010, the municipal Human Development Index was 0.646. This compares to 0.283 in 1991 and 0.454 in 2000.

On the 2010 census religion was reported as Catholic by 3,071 people, Evangelical by 1,607 people and Animism by 0 people.

In 2017, the average monthly salary of formal workers was 2.1 minimum wages. Formally employed people were 7.6% of the total population. Households with monthly income of up to half a minimum wage per person represent 41.2% of the population. Recent estimates of GDP per capita:

== Health and sanitation ==
21.8% of households have adequate sanitation, 21.9% of urban households are on public roads with afforestation and 1.5% of urban households are on public roads with adequate urbanization (presence of manhole, sidewalk, pavement and curb). Annual hospitalizations due to diarrhea are 0.5 per 1,000 inhabitants. Deaths per 1,000 live births:

== Municipal finances ==
Recent figures for committed municipal expenditure:

Recent figures for realized municipal revenue:

== See also ==
- List of municipalities in Rondônia

== Sources ==
- Brasil / Rondônia / Cacaulândia, IBGE
- "Cacaulândia", Geonames
- Cacaulândia, Brazilian Institute of Geography and Statistics
- "Cacaulândia, Brazil", Mindat
- História, IBGE
- NASA Earth Observations Data Set Index, NASA, archived from the original on 28 November 2017
- NASA Earth Observations: Rainfall (1 month - TRMM), NASA/Tropical Rainfall Monitoring Mission, archived from the original on 19 April 2019
