= São Miguel do Guaporé =

Municipality in Rondônia, Brazil

- Municipality
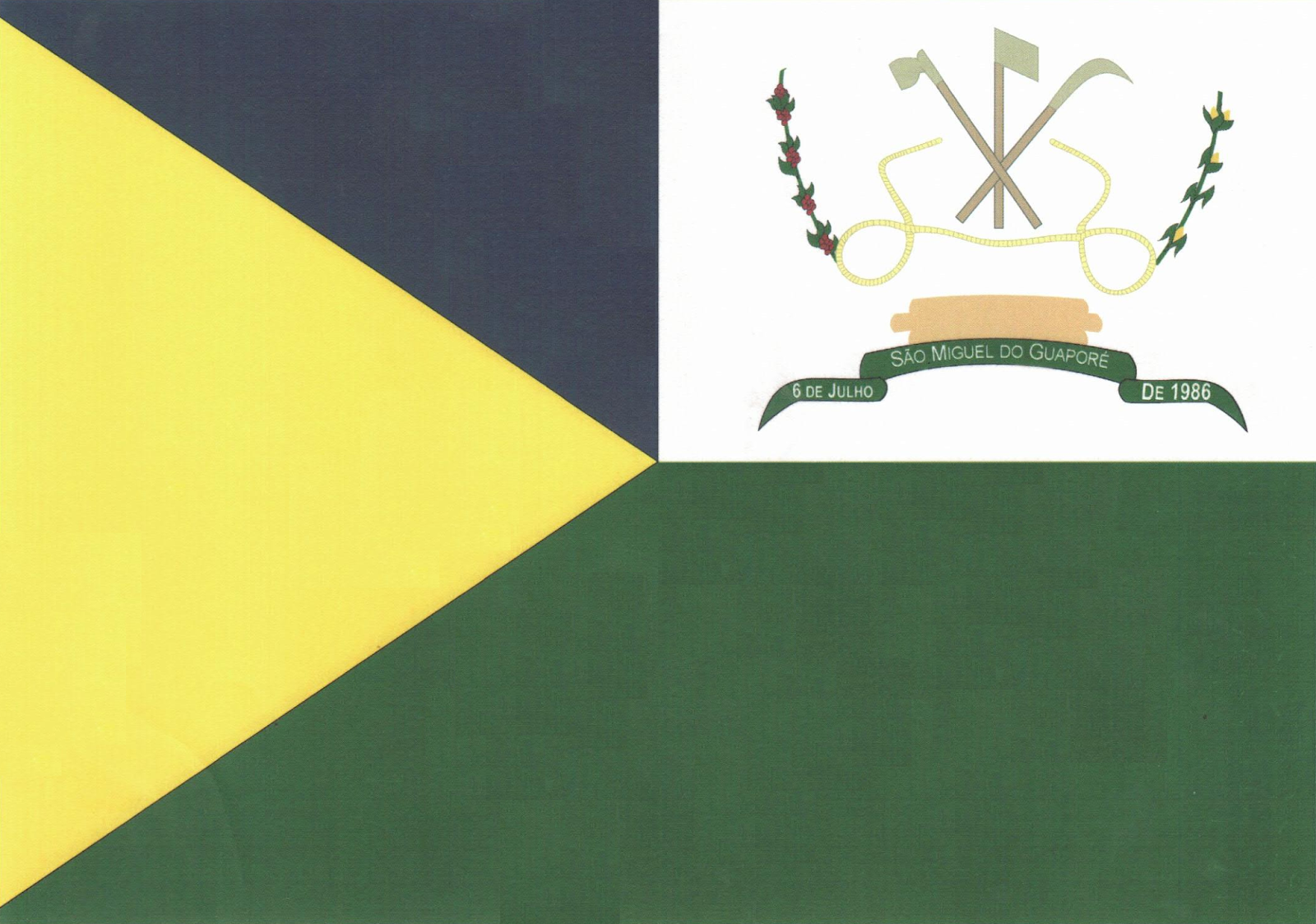
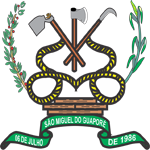
- Flag Coat of arms

- Location in Rondônia state

- Location in Brazil
- Coordinates: 11°41′37″S 62°42′41″W
- Country: Brazil
- Region: North
- State: Rondônia

Area
  - Total: 7,460 km^{2} (2,880 sq mi)

Population (2020)
  - Total: 23,077
  - Density: 3.09/km^{2} (8.01/sq mi)
- Time zone: UTC−4 (AMT)

São Miguel do Guaporé is a municipality located in the Brazilian state of Rondônia. Its population was 23,077 (2020) and its area is 7,460 km^{2}.

== See also ==
- List of municipalities in Rondônia
