= Ruidelamas =

- Locality
- Location within Province of León Location within Castile and León Location within Spain
- Coordinates: 42°42′21″N 6°56′50″W
- Country: Spain
- Autonomous community: Castile and León
- Province: Province of León
- Municipality: Balboa, León
- Elevation: 956 m (3,136 ft)

Population
  - Total: 1

Ruidelamas is a locality located in the municipality of Balboa, León, in León province, Castile and León, Spain. As of 2020, it has a population of 1.

== Geography ==
Ruidelamas is located 153km west of León, Spain.
