= Novo Horizonte do Oeste =

Municipality in Rondônia, Brazil

- Municipality
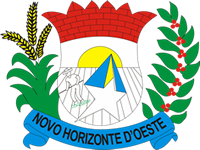
- Flag Coat of arms

- Location in Rondônia state

- Location in Brazil
- Coordinates: 11°42′36″S 62°0′0″W
- Country: Brazil
- Region: North
- State: Rondônia

Area
  - Total: 843 km^{2} (325 sq mi)

Population (2020)
  - Total: 8,329
  - Density: 9.88/km^{2} (25.6/sq mi)
- Time zone: UTC−4 (AMT)

Novo Horizonte do Oeste is a municipality located in the Brazilian state of Rondônia. Its population was 8,329 (2020) and its area is 843 km^{2}.

== See also ==
- List of municipalities in Rondônia
