= Governador Jorge Teixeira =

Municipality in Rondônia, Brazil

- Municipality
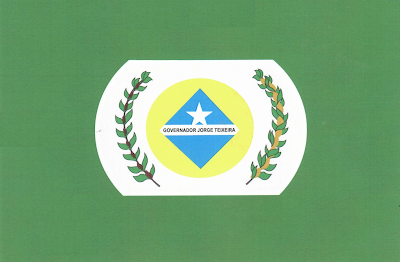
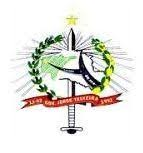
- Flag Coat of arms

- Location in Rondônia state

- Location in Brazil
- Coordinates: 10°31′30″S 62°38′38″W
- Country: Brazil
- Region: North
- State: Rondônia

Area
  - Total: 5,067 km^{2} (1,956 sq mi)

Population (2020)
  - Total: 7,445
  - Density: 1.469/km^{2} (3.805/sq mi)
- Time zone: UTC−4 (AMT)

Governador Jorge Teixeira is a municipality located in the Brazilian state of Rondônia. Its population was 7,445 (2020) and its area is 5,067 km^{2}.

== See also ==
- List of municipalities in Rondônia
