= Mirante da Serra =

Municipality in Rondônia, Brazil

- Municipality
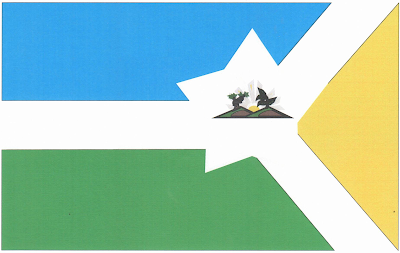
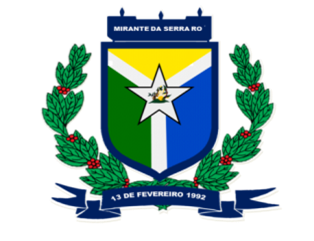
- Flag Coat of arms

- Location in Rondônia state

- Location in Brazil
- Coordinates: 11°1′47″S 62°40′30″W
- Country: Brazil
- Region: North
- State: Rondônia

Area
  - Total: 1,192 km^{2} (460 sq mi)

Population (2020)
  - Total: 10,818
  - Density: 9.076/km^{2} (23.51/sq mi)
- Time zone: UTC−4 (AMT)

Mirante da Serra is a municipality located in the Brazilian state of Rondônia. Its population was 10,818 (2020) and its area is 1,192 km^{2}.

== See also ==
- List of municipalities in Rondônia
