= Cabixi =

Municipality in Rondônia, Brazil

- Municipality
- The Municipality of Cabixi
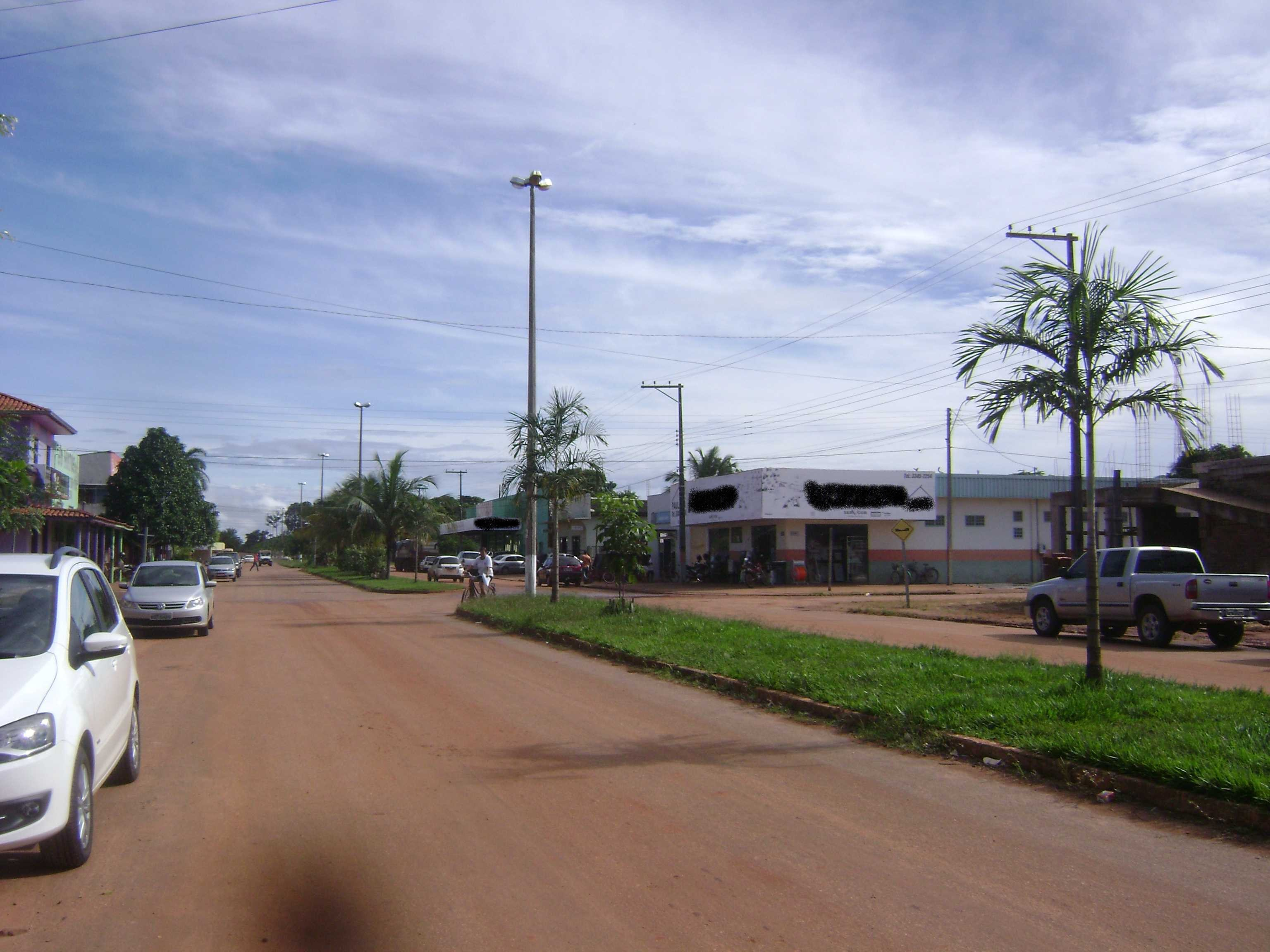

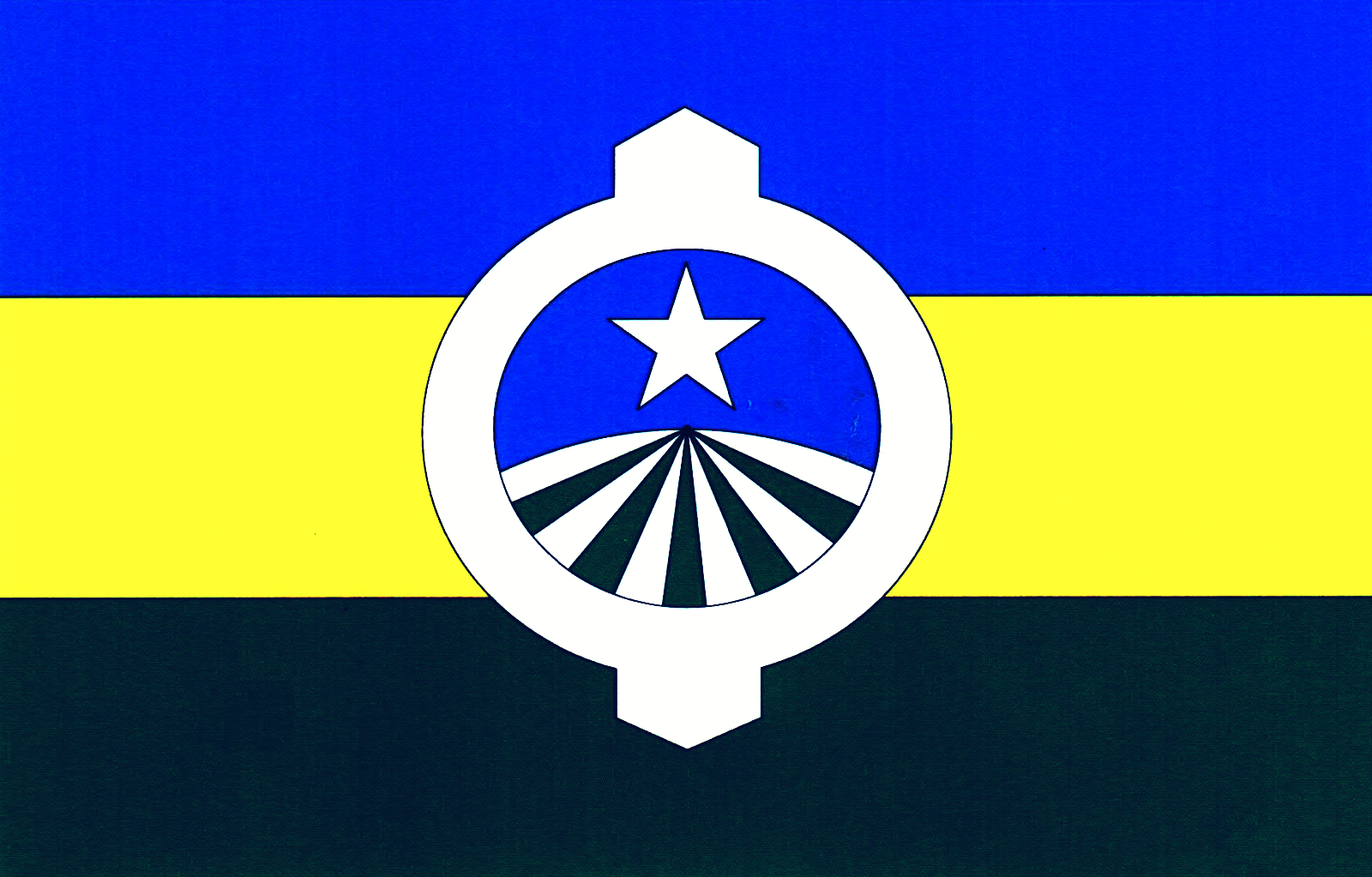
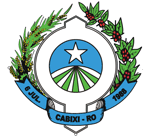
- Flag Coat of arms

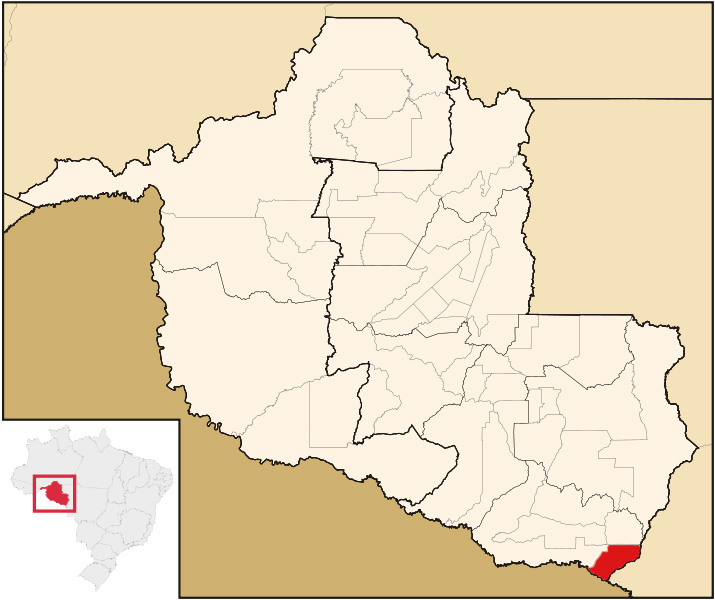
- Location of Cabixi in the State of Rondônia
- Coordinates: 13°29′52″S 60°33′15″W
- Country: Brazil
- Region: North
- State: Rondônia

Government
  - Mayor: José Rozario Barroso (PMDB)

Area
  - Total: 1,314 km^{2} (507 sq mi)
- Elevation: 230 m (750 ft)

Population (2020)
  - Total: 5,188
  - Density: 5.64/km^{2} (14.6/sq mi)
- Time zone: UTC−4 (AMT)
- HDI (2000): 0.705 – medium

Cabixi is a municipality located in the Brazilian state of Rondônia. Its population was 5,188 (2020) and its area is 1,314 km^{2}. It is the southernmost city in Rondônia.

== See also ==
- List of municipalities in Rondônia
