= Quintela (León) =

- Locality
- Location within Province of León Location within Castile and León Location within Spain
- Coordinates: 42°41′19″N 6°55′44″W
- Country: Spain
- Autonomous community: Castile and León
- Province: Province of León
- Municipality: Balboa, León
- Elevation: 656 m (2,152 ft)

Population
  - Total: 15

Quintela is a locality located in the municipality of Balboa, León, in León province, Castile and León, Spain. As of 2020, it has a population of 15.

== Geography ==
Quintela is located 148km west of León, Spain.
