= Ministro Andreazza =

Municipality in Rondônia, Brazil

- Municipality
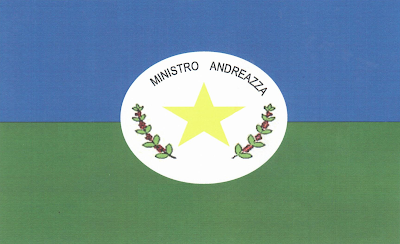
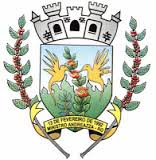
- Flag Coat of arms

- Location in Rondônia state

- Location in Brazil
- Coordinates: 11°11′49″S 61°31′1″W
- Country: Brazil
- Region: North
- State: Rondônia

Area
  - Total: 798 km^{2} (308 sq mi)

Population (2020)
  - Total: 9,559
  - Density: 12.0/km^{2} (31.0/sq mi)
- Time zone: UTC−4 (AMT)

Ministro Andreazza is a municipality located in the Brazilian state of Rondônia. Its population was 9,559 (2020) and its area is 798 km^{2}.

== See also ==
- List of municipalities in Rondônia
