= Villarmarín =

- Locality
- Location within Province of León Location within Castile and León Location within Spain
- Coordinates: 42°42′45″N 6°57′7″W
- Country: Spain
- Autonomous community: Castile and León
- Province: Province of León
- Municipality: Balboa, León
- Elevation: 976 m (3,202 ft)

Population
  - Total: 7

Villarmarín is a locality located in the municipality of Balboa, León, in León province, Castile and León, Spain. As of 2020, it has a population of 7.

== Geography ==
Villarmarín is located 154km west of León, Spain.
