= Cantejeira =

- Locality
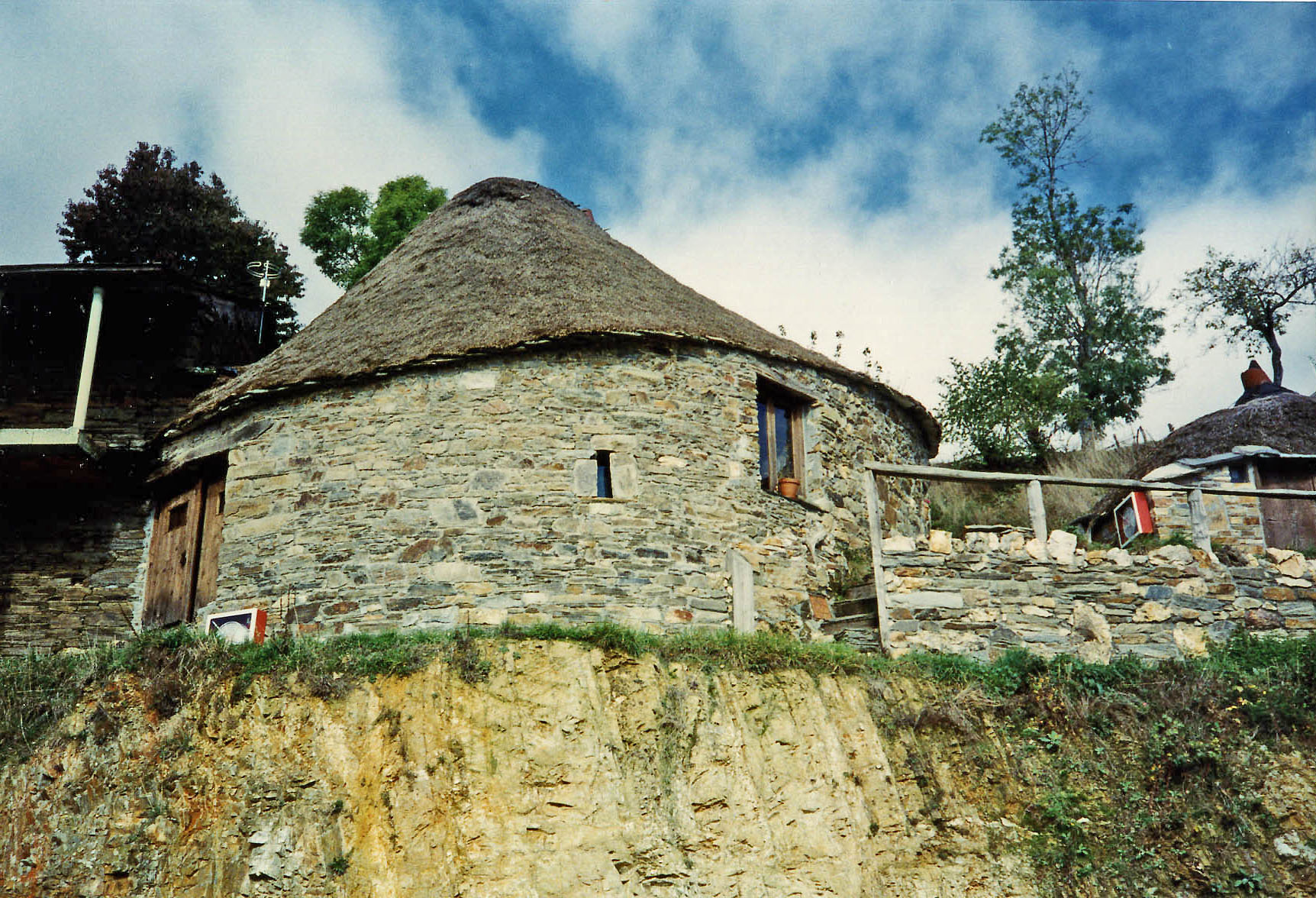

- Location within Province of León Location within Castile and León Location within Spain
- Coordinates: 42°42′25″N 6°53′44″W
- Country: Spain
- Autonomous community: Castile and León
- Province: Province of León
- Municipality: Balboa, León
- Elevation: 1,087 m (3,566 ft)

Population
  - Total: 36

Cantejeira is a locality located in the municipality of Balboa, León, in León province, Castile and León, Spain. As of 2020, it has a population of 36.

== Geography ==
Cantejeira is located 155km west of León, Spain.
