= Alto Paraíso =

Municipality in Rondônia, Brazil

- Municipality
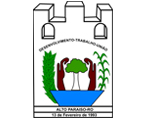
- Flag Coat of arms

- Location in Rondônia state

- Location in Brazil
- Coordinates: 9°42′47″S 63°19′15″W
- Country: Brazil
- Region: North
- State: Rondônia

Area
  - Total: 2,652 km^{2} (1,024 sq mi)

Population (2020)
  - Total: 21,847
  - Density: 8.238/km^{2} (21.34/sq mi)
- Time zone: UTC−4 (AMT)

Alto Paraíso (Brazilian Portuguese: [ˈawtu paɾaˈizu]) is a municipality located in the Brazilian state of Rondônia. Its population was 21,847 (2020) and its area is 2,652 km^{2}.

== See also ==
- List of municipalities in Rondônia
