= Castañeiras =

Coordinates: 42°44′N 6°58′W

Castañeira is a village in the municipality of Balboa in El Bierzo, province of León, Autonomous Community of Castilla y León, Spain. It is located almost in the Port of Portelo, and it is the last village before entering El Bierzo in the province of Lugo. The nearest towns are Comeal (1.4 km), Parajís (1.7 km) and Villanueva (Balboa) (0.9 km).

Castañeira (like many other towns in El Bierzo) was known for a legend that spoke of a "golden yoke" buried nearby, related to Moors and treasures (the Moors, here, not being a historical group of people but a kind of legendary beings) and where they lived, "the Curtain the Mouro".
