= Monte Negro, Rondônia =

Municipality in Rondônia, Brazil

Monte Negro
- Municipality
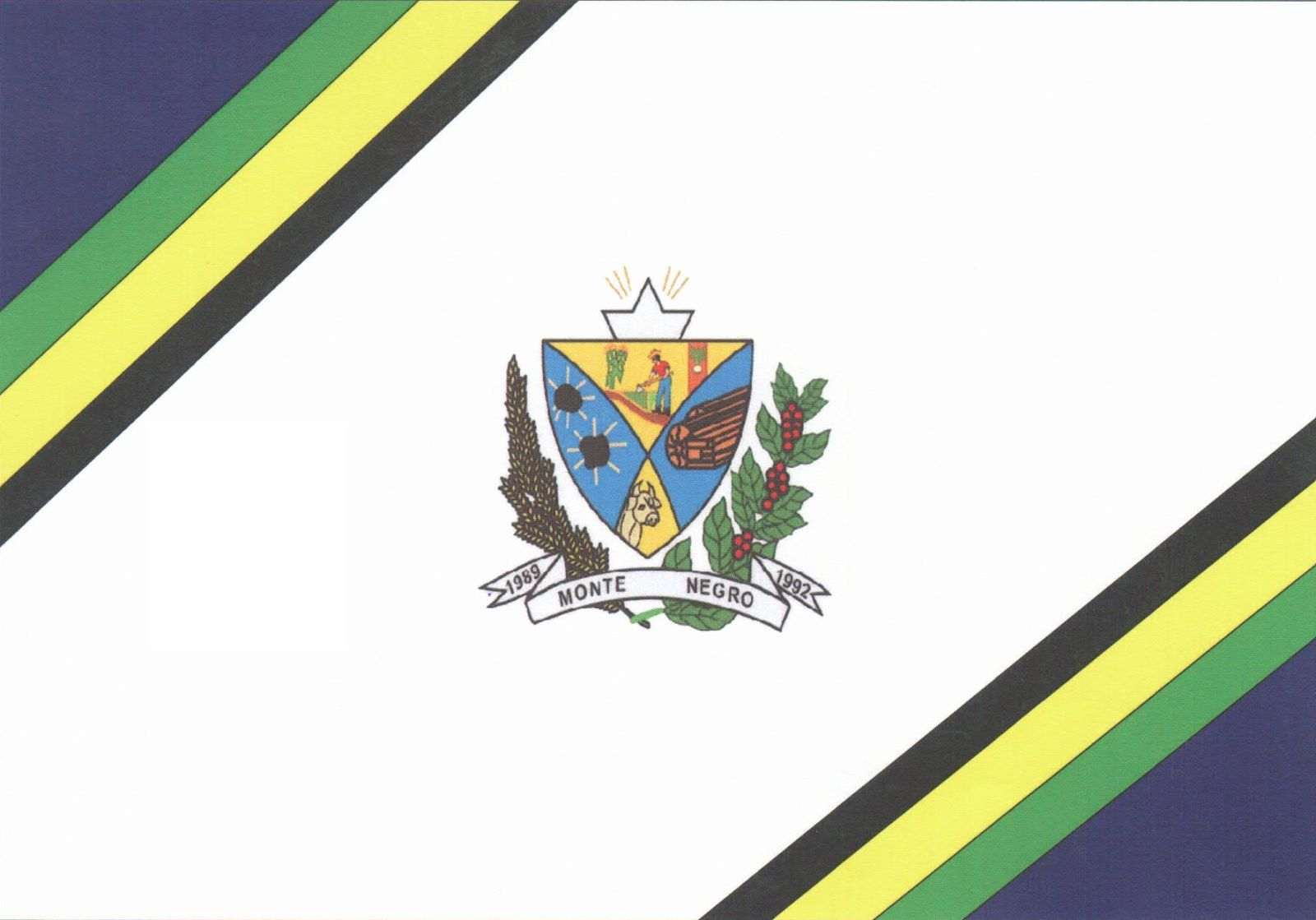
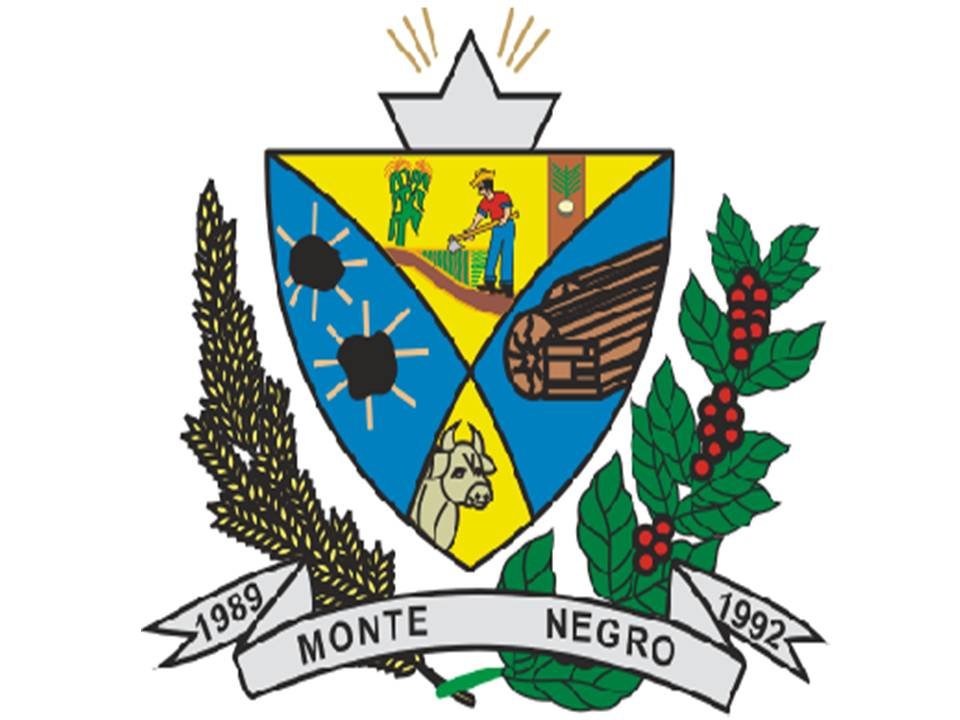
- Flag Coat of arms

- Location in Rondônia state

- Location in Brazil
- Coordinates: 10°17′40″S 63°19′31″W
- Country: Brazil
- Region: North
- State: Rondônia

Area
  - Total: 1,931 km^{2} (746 sq mi)

Population (2020)
  - Total: 16,007
  - Density: 8.289/km^{2} (21.47/sq mi)
- Time zone: UTC−4 (AMT)

Monte Negro is a municipality located in the Brazilian state of Rondônia. Its population was 16,007 (2020) and its area is 1,931 km^{2}.

== See also ==
- List of municipalities in Rondônia
