= Rio Crespo =

Municipality in Rondônia, Brazil

- Municipality
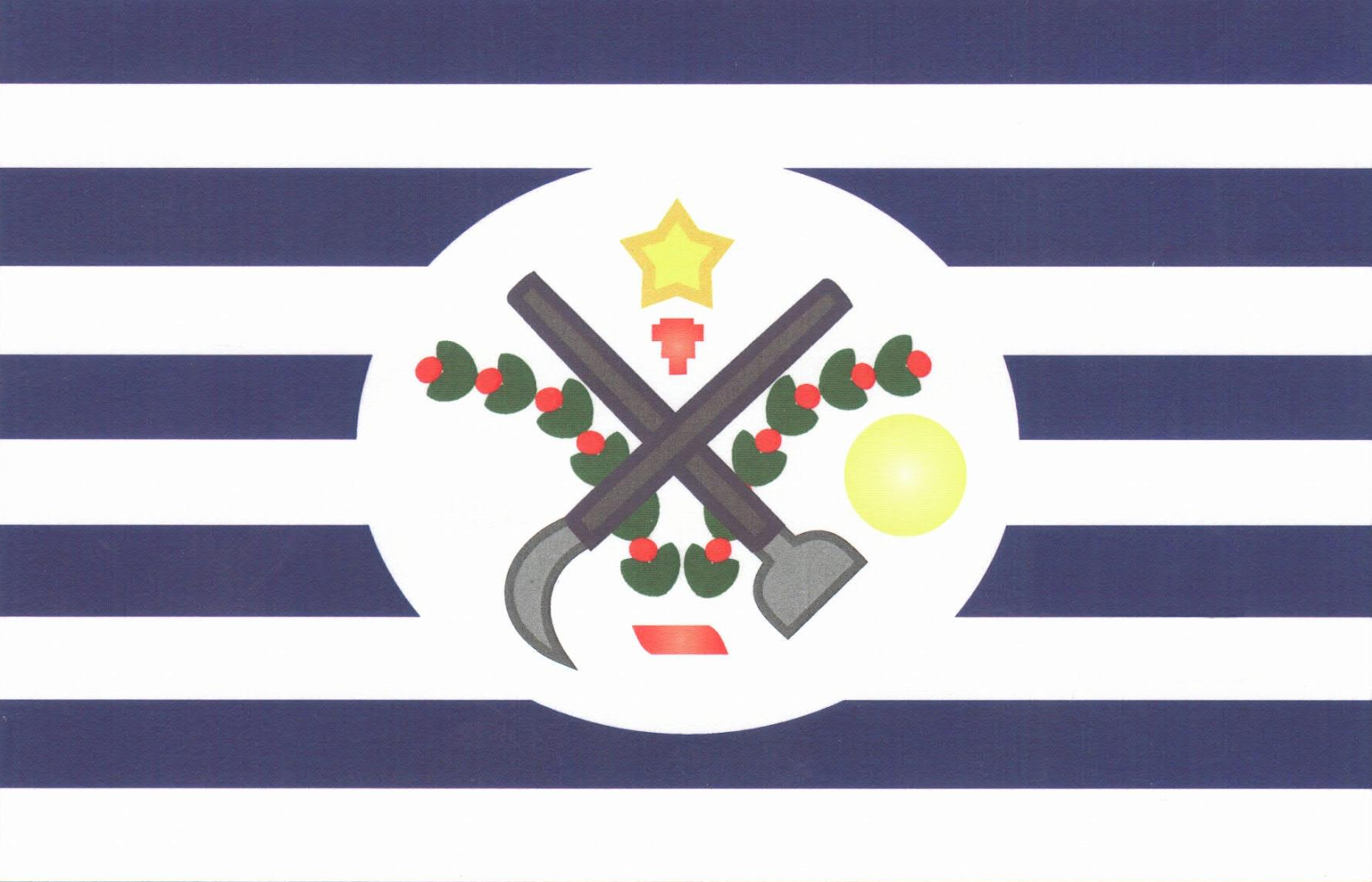
- Flag Coat of arms

- Location in Rondônia state

- Location in Brazil
- Coordinates: 9°42′18″S 62°53′59″W
- Country: Brazil
- Region: North
- State: Rondônia

Area
  - Total: 1,718 km^{2} (663 sq mi)

Population (2020)
  - Total: 3,804
  - Density: 2.214/km^{2} (5.735/sq mi)
- Time zone: UTC−4 (AMT)

Rio Crespo is a municipality located in the Brazilian state of Rondônia. Its population was 3,804 (2020) and its area is 1,718 km^{2}.

== See also ==
- List of municipalities in Rondônia
