= Chupinguaia =

Municipality in Rondônia, Brazil

- Municipality
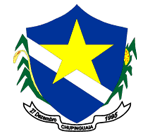
- Flag Coat of arms

- Location in Rondônia state

- Location in Brazil
- Coordinates: 12°33′8″S 60°53′59″W
- Country: Brazil
- Region: North
- State: Rondônia

Area
  - Total: 5,127 km^{2} (1,980 sq mi)

Population (2020)
  - Total: 11,472
  - Density: 2.238/km^{2} (5.795/sq mi)
- Time zone: UTC−4 (AMT)

Chupinguaia is a municipality located in the Brazilian state of Rondônia. Its population was 11,472 (2020) and its area is 5,127 km^{2}.

== See also ==
- List of municipalities in Rondônia
