= Villafeile =

- Locality
- Location within Province of León Location within Castile and León Location within Spain
- Coordinates: 42°41′8″N 6°55′2″W
- Country: Spain
- Autonomous community: Castile and León
- Province: Province of León
- Municipality: Balboa, León
- Elevation: 851 m (2,792 ft)

Population
  - Total: 47

Villafeile is a locality located in the municipality of Balboa, León, in León province, Castile and León, Spain. As of 2020, it has a population of 47.

== Geography ==
Villafeile is located 150km west of León, Spain.
