= Balboa, León =

Balboa
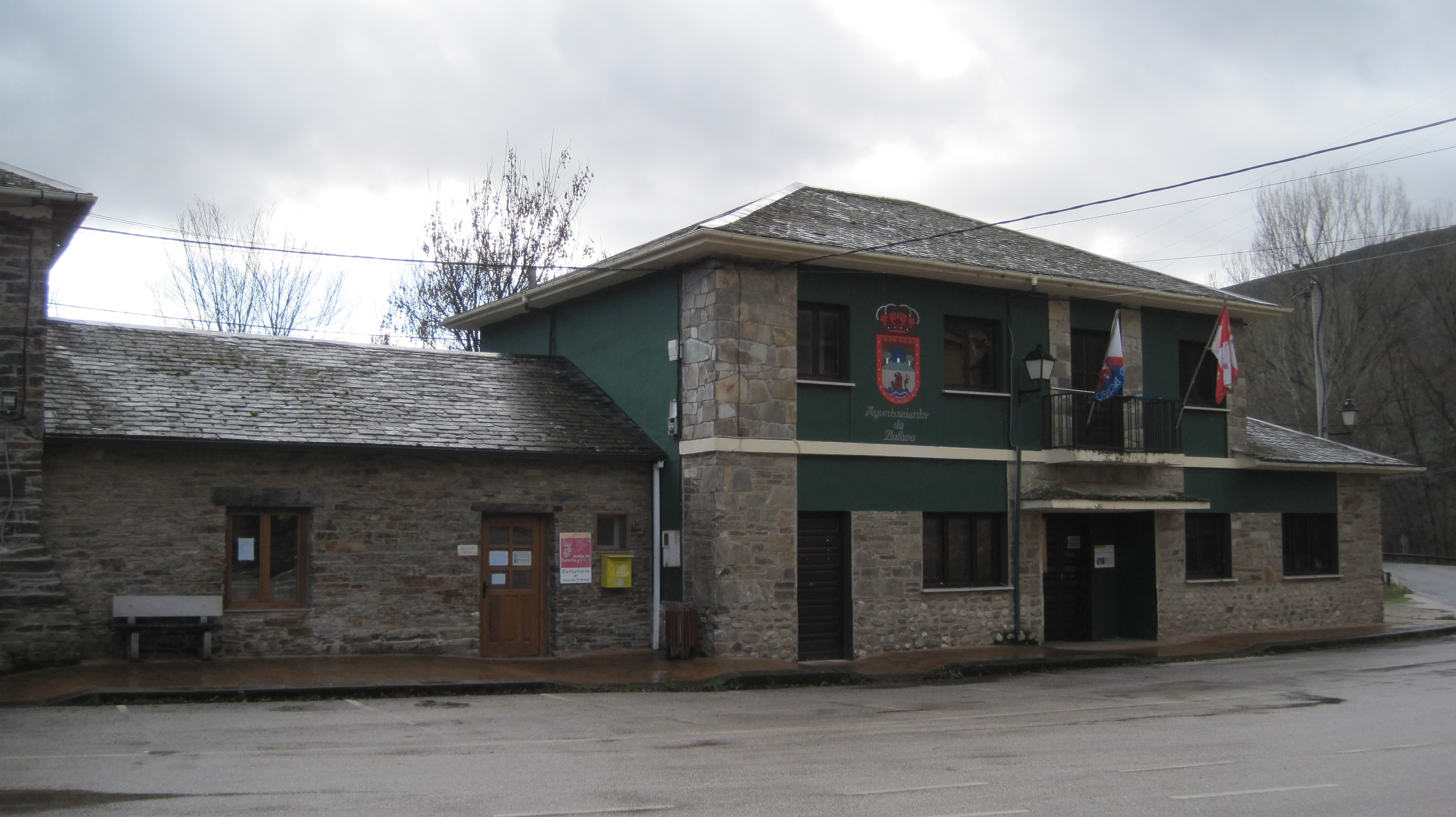
- Town hall

- Coat of arms

- Location within Spain
- Coordinates: 42°42′23″N 6°55′23″W
- Country: Spain
- Autonomous community: Castile and León
- Province: León
- Comarca: El Bierzo
- Municipality: Balboa

Government
  - Mayor: Juan José López Peña (PP)

Area
  - Total: 51.04 km^{2} (19.71 sq mi)
- Elevation: 684 m (2,244 ft)

Population (2025-01-01)
  - Total: 269
  - Density: 5.27/km^{2} (13.7/sq mi)
- Demonyms: balboano, balboana
- Time zone: UTC+1 (CET)
  - Summer (DST): UTC+2 (CEST)
- Postal Code: 24525
- Telephone prefix: 987
- Climate: Csb

Balboa (Spanish: Spanish pronunciation: [balˈβoa]), known in Leonese language as Valbona, is a municipality and village located in the region of El Bierzo (province of León, Castile and León, Spain). According to the 2025 census (INE), the municipality had a population of 269 inhabitants.

== Pedanías ==
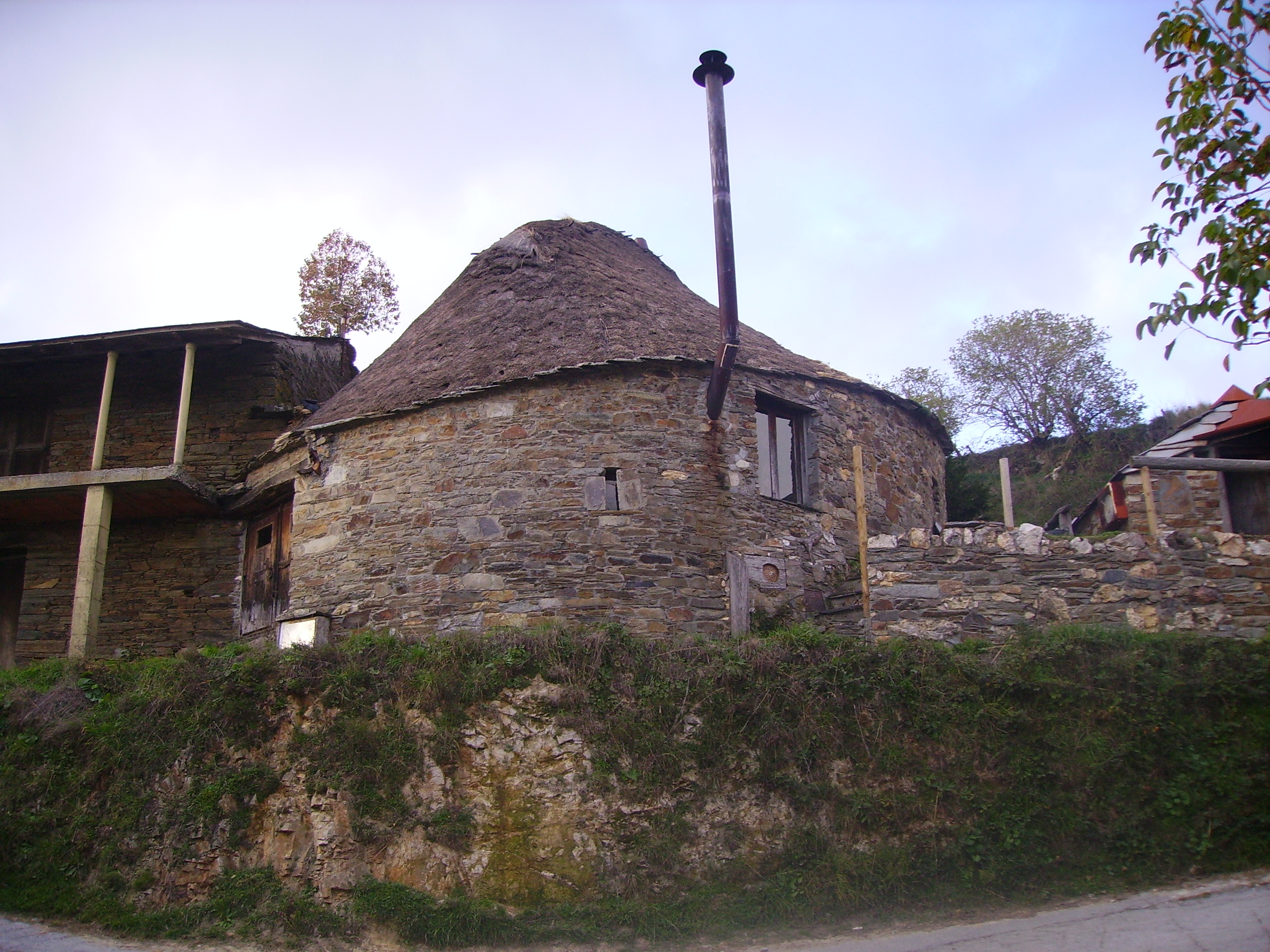
Palloza in Canteixeira

The municipality comprises the following parishes:

- Balboa
- Cantejeira
- Pumarín
- Ruidelamas
- Castañeiras
- Castañoso
- Chandevillar
- Ruideferros
- Valverde
- Villarmarín
- Villafeile
- Fuentes de Oliva
- Lamagrande
- Quintela
- Villanueva
- Parajís
- Villariños

== Festivities ==
The main festivals are:

- The Magical Night of Saint John (June 24)
- Observatory Festival (July 1–2)
- Santa Marina (July 18)
- Reggaeboa (third weekend of July)
- Vibra Balboa (first weekend of September)
- Celtic Magosto (first weekend of November)
