= Nova Brasilândia d'Oeste =

Municipality in Rondônia, Brazil

- Municipality
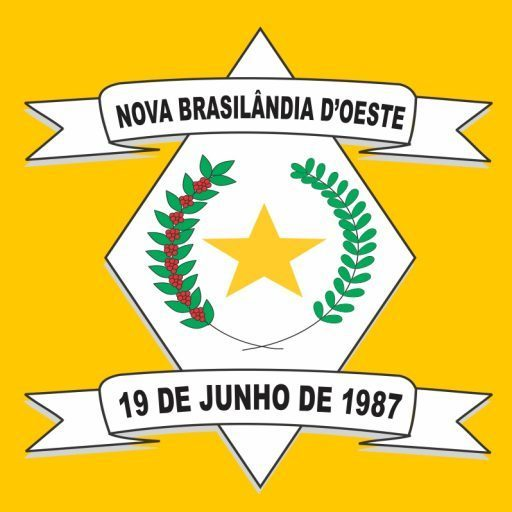
- Flag Coat of arms

- Location in Rondônia state

- Location in Brazil
- Coordinates: 11°43′11″S 62°18′57″W
- Country: Brazil
- Region: North
- State: Rondônia

Area
  - Total: 1,703 km^{2} (658 sq mi)

Population (2020)
  - Total: 20,489
  - Density: 12.03/km^{2} (31.16/sq mi)
- Time zone: UTC−4 (AMT)

Nova Brasilândia d'Oeste is a municipality located in the Brazilian state of Rondônia. Its population was 20,489 (2020) and its area is 1,703 km^{2}.

== See also ==
- List of municipalities in Rondônia
