= Pumarín =

- Locality
- Location within Province of León Location within Castile and León Location within Spain
- Coordinates: 42°42′14″N 6°54′16″W
- Country: Spain
- Autonomous community: Castile and León
- Province: Province of León
- Municipality: Balboa, León
- Elevation: 1,044 m (3,425 ft)

Population
  - Total: 17

Pumarín is a hamlet located in the municipality of Balboa, León, in León province, Castile and León, Spain. As of 2020, it has a population of 17.

== Geography ==
Pumarín is located 154km west of León, Spain.
