= Fuente de Oliva =

- Locality
- Location within Province of León Location within Castile and León Location within Spain
- Coordinates: 42°44′10″N 6°56′54″W
- Country: Spain
- Autonomous community: Castile and León
- Province: Province of León
- Municipality: Balboa, León
- Elevation: 1,087 m (3,566 ft)

Population
  - Total: 3

Fuente de Oliva is a locality located in the municipality of Balboa, León, in León province, Castile and León, Spain. As of 2020, it has a population of 3.

== Geography ==
Fuente de Oliva is located 158km west of León, Spain.
