= Lamagrande =

- Locality
- Location within Province of León Location within Castile and León Location within Spain
- Coordinates: 42°41′3″N 6°54′36″W
- Country: Spain
- Autonomous community: Castile and León
- Province: Province of León
- Municipality: Balboa, León
- Elevation: 981 m (3,219 ft)

Population
  - Total: 11

Lamagrande is a locality located in the municipality of Balboa, León, in León province, Castile and León, Spain. As of 2020, it has a population of 11.

== Geography ==
Lamagrande is located 151km west of León, Spain.
