= Chandevillar =

- Locality
- Location within Province of León Location within Castile and León Location within Spain
- Coordinates: 42°43′9″N 6°55′32″W
- Country: Spain
- Autonomous community: Castile and León
- Province: Province of León
- Municipality: Balboa, León
- Elevation: 876 m (2,874 ft)

Population
  - Total: 10

Chandevillar is a locality located in the municipality of Balboa, León, in León province, Castile and León, Spain. As of 2020, it has a population of 10.

== Geography ==
Chandevillar is located 152km west of León, Spain.
