= Seringueiras =

Municipality in Rondônia, Brazil

- Municipality
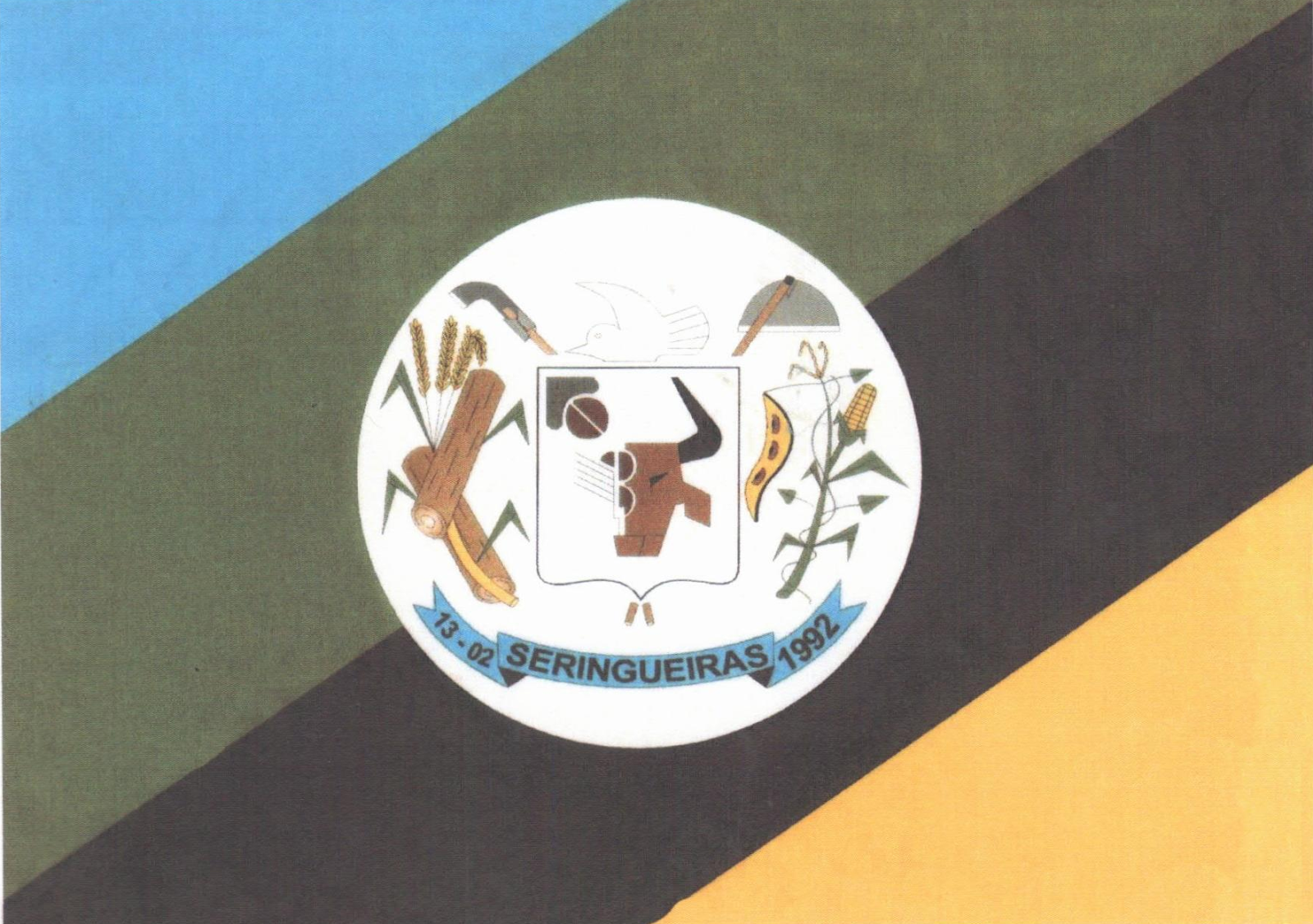
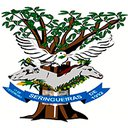
- Flag Coat of arms

- Location in Rondônia state

- Location in Brazil
- Coordinates: 11°47′53″S 63°1′52″W
- Country: Brazil
- Region: North
- State: Rondônia

Area
  - Total: 3,774 km^{2} (1,457 sq mi)

Population (2020)
  - Total: 11,851
  - Density: 3.140/km^{2} (8.133/sq mi)
- Time zone: UTC−4 (AMT)

Seringueiras is a municipality located in the Brazilian state of Rondônia. Its population was 11,851 (2020) and its area is 3,774 km^{2}.

== See also ==
- List of municipalities in Rondônia
