= São Felipe d'Oeste =

Municipality in Rondônia, Brazil

- Municipality
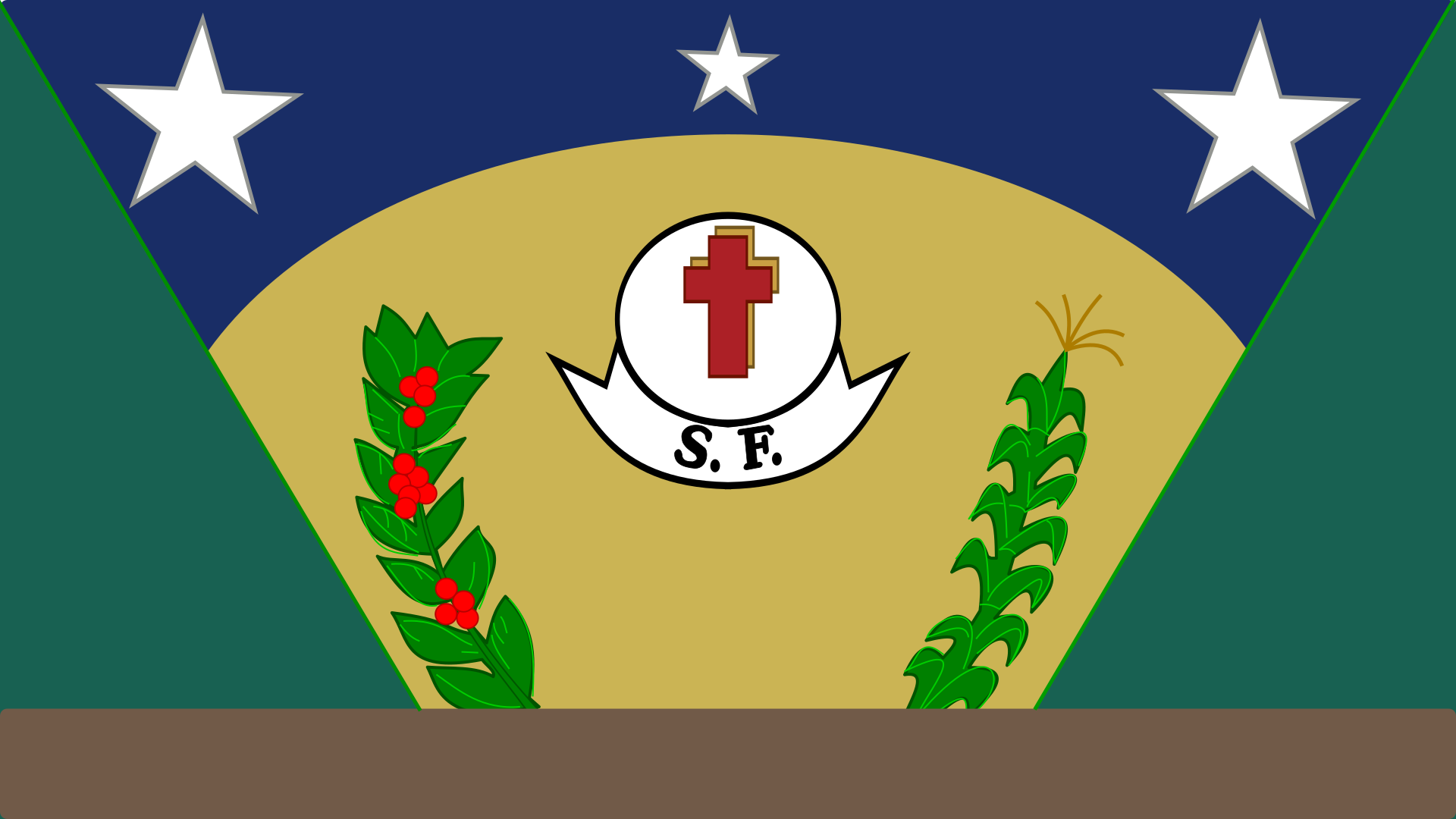
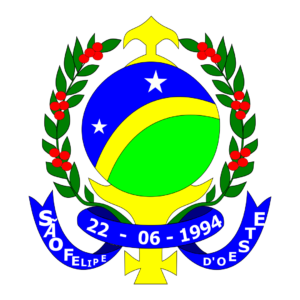
- Flag Coat of arms

- Location in Rondônia state

- Location in Brazil
- Coordinates: 11°54′9″S 61°30′8″W
- Country: Brazil
- Region: North
- State: Rondônia

Area
  - Total: 542 km^{2} (209 sq mi)

Population (2020)
  - Total: 5,066
  - Density: 9.35/km^{2} (24.2/sq mi)
- Time zone: UTC−4 (AMT)

São Felipe d'Oeste is a municipality located in the Brazilian state of Rondônia. Its population was 5,066 (2020) and its area is 542 km^{2}.

== See also ==
- List of municipalities in Rondônia
