= Villariños =

- Locality
- Location within Province of León Location within Castile and León Location within Spain
- Coordinates: 42°43′39″N 6°54′49″W
- Country: Spain
- Autonomous community: Castile and León
- Province: Province of León
- Municipality: Balboa, León
- Elevation: 998 m (3,274 ft)

Population
  - Total: 23

Villariños is a locality located in the municipality of Balboa, León, in León province, Castile and León, Spain. As of 2020, it has a population of 23.

== Geography ==
Villariños is located 153km west of León, Spain.
