= Colorado do Oeste =

Municipality in Rondônia, Brazil

- Municipality
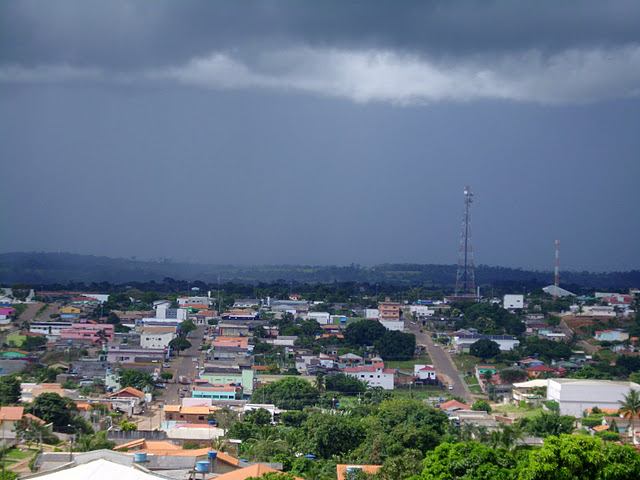

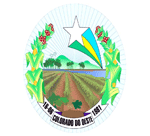
- Flag Coat of arms

- Location in Rondônia state

- Location in Brazil
- Coordinates: 13°7′0″S 60°32′30″W
- Country: Brazil
- Region: North
- State: Rondônia

Area
  - Total: 1,451 km^{2} (560 sq mi)

Population (2020)
  - Total: 15,544
  - Density: 10.71/km^{2} (27.75/sq mi)
- Time zone: UTC−4 (AMT)

Colorado do Oeste is a municipality located in the Brazilian state of Rondônia. Its population was 15,544 (2020) and its area is 1,451 km^{2}.

== See also ==
- List of municipalities in Rondônia
