= Buritis, Rondônia =

Municipality in Rondônia, Brazil

Buritis
- Municipality
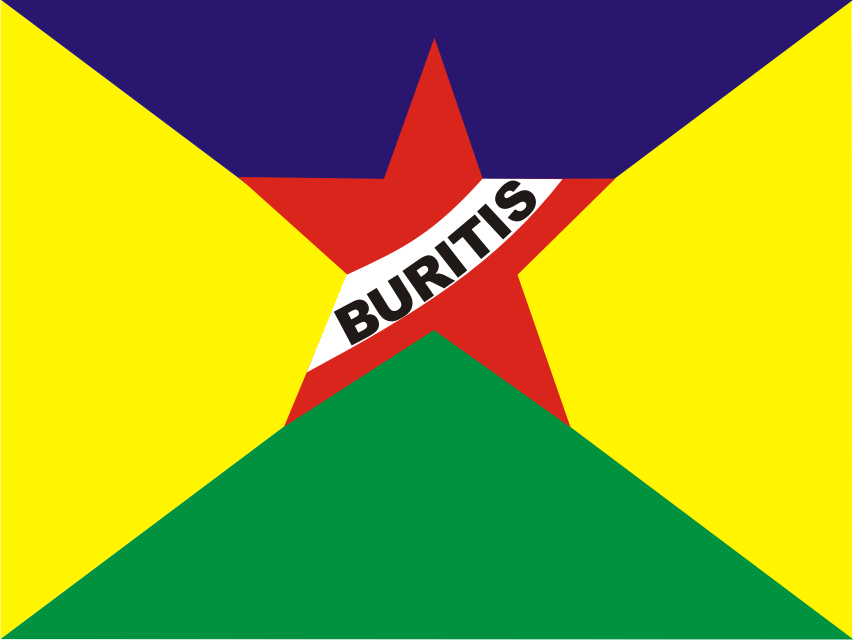
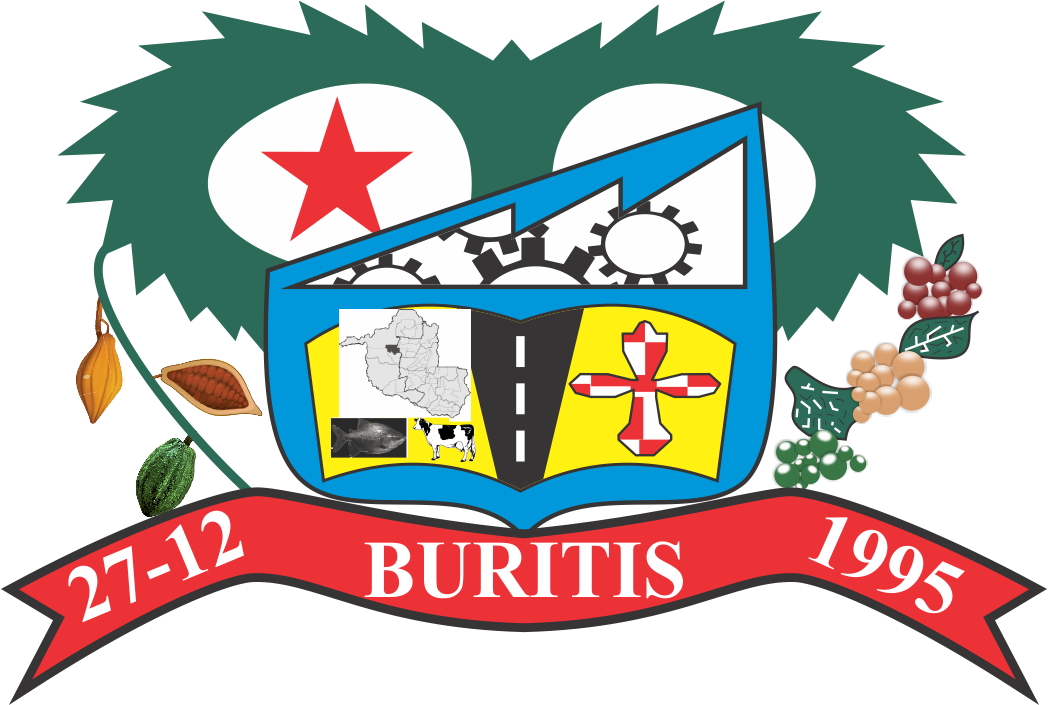
- Flag Coat of arms

- Location in Rondônia state

- Location in Brazil
- Coordinates: 10°12′43″S 63°49′44″W
- Country: Brazil
- Region: North
- State: Rondônia

Area
  - Total: 3,266 km^{2} (1,261 sq mi)

Population (2020)
  - Total: 40,356
  - Density: 12.36/km^{2} (32.00/sq mi)
- Time zone: UTC−4 (AMT)

Buritis is a municipality located in the Brazilian state of Rondônia. Its population was 40,356 (2020) and its area is 3,266 km^{2}. The city consists largely of unpaved, dirt packed roads. There is one large grocery store of the Goncalves chain. Buritis has one stoplight. Surrounding and outlying farmers rely on Buritis to supply goods and replenish supplies. The city has a democratic government with a mayor and eight sitting Council members for each of the eight sectors. The climate is tropical/equatorial with few variations in temperature and climate from month to month.

== See also ==
- List of municipalities in Rondônia
