= Nova União, Rondônia =

Municipality in Rondônia, Brazil

Nova União
- Municipality
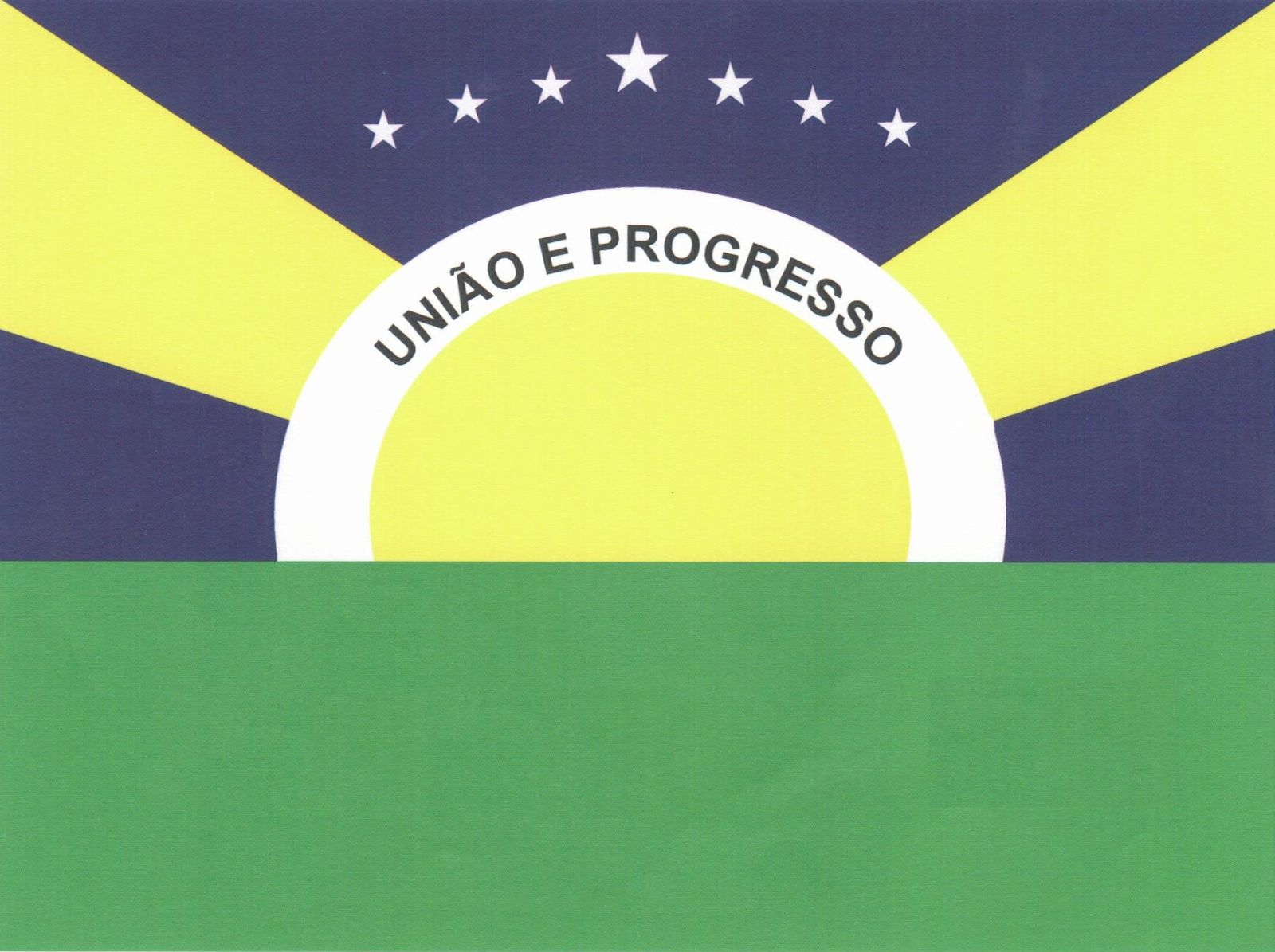
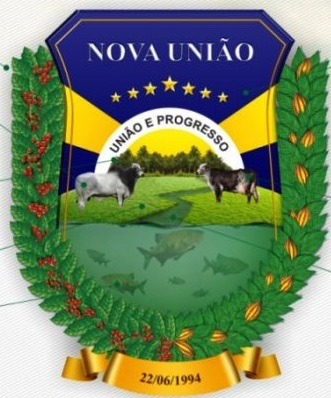
- Flag Coat of arms

- Location in Rondônia state

- Location in Brazil
- Coordinates: 10°54′14″S 62°33′39″W
- Country: Brazil
- Region: North
- State: Rondônia

Area
  - Total: 807 km^{2} (312 sq mi)

Population (2020)
  - Total: 6,895
  - Density: 8.54/km^{2} (22.1/sq mi)
- Time zone: UTC−4 (AMT)

Nova União is a municipality located in the Brazilian state of Rondônia. Its population was 6,895 (2020) and its area is 807 km^{2}.

== See also ==
- List of municipalities in Rondônia
