= Mariana Castanheira =

Brazilian microbiologist

- Born: Brazil
- Education: Federal University of São Paulo
- Scientific career
- Workplaces: Federal University of São Paulo; University of Bristol; JMI Laboratories

Mariana Castanheira is a Brazilian microbiologist who is the Chief Scientific Officer at JMI Laboratories. Her research considers antimicrobial surveillance and the design. She was elected Fellow of the American Society for Microbiology in 2023.

== Early life and education ==
Castanheira studied pharmacy and biochemistry at the Federal University of São Paulo. She remained there for her PhD, studying molecular epidemiology and the mechanisms that underpin gram-positive and gram-negative bacteria. After earning her doctorate, she moved to the University of Bristol, where she studied beta-lactamase. She completed a postdoctoral fellowship at the Federal University of São Paulo in 2005.

== Research and career ==
Castanheira worked as a research scientist at QIAGEN for a year before joining JMI Laboratories, a microbiology laboratory in Iowa. She worked on antimicrobial surveillance, programs that are critical for understanding the prevalence of bacteria and fungi. She was appointed Chief Scientific Officer at JMI Laboratories in 2020. In 2023, Castanheira was made Fellow of the American Society for Microbiology.

== Selected publications ==
- Rodrigo Elisandro Mendes; Mariana Castanheira; Antonio Carlos Campos Pignatari; Ana Cristina Gales (April 2006). "Metalo-beta-lactamases". Jornal brasileiro de patologia e medicina laboratorial. 42 (2): 103–113. doi:10.1590/s1676-24442006000200007. ISSN 1676-2444. Wikidata Q62795347.
- Shawn R Lockhart; Kizee A Etienne; Snigdha Vallabhaneni; et al. (20 October 2016). "Simultaneous Emergence of Multidrug-Resistant Candida auris on 3 Continents Confirmed by Whole-Genome Sequencing and Epidemiological Analyses". Clinical Infectious Diseases. 64 (2): 134–140. doi:10.1093/cid/ciw691. ISSN 1058-4838. PMC 5215215. PMID 27988485. Wikidata Q34547546.
- Barbara D Alexander; Melissa D Johnson; Christopher D Pfeiffer; et al. (13 March 2013). "Increasing echinocandin resistance in Candida glabrata: clinical failure correlates with presence of FKS mutations and elevated minimum inhibitory concentrations". Clinical Infectious Diseases. 56 (12): 1724–1732. doi:10.1093/cid/cit136. ISSN 1058-4838. PMC 3658363. PMID 23487382. Wikidata Q36856930.
