= Hilda Nélida Castañeira =

Argentine politician (1926–2007)

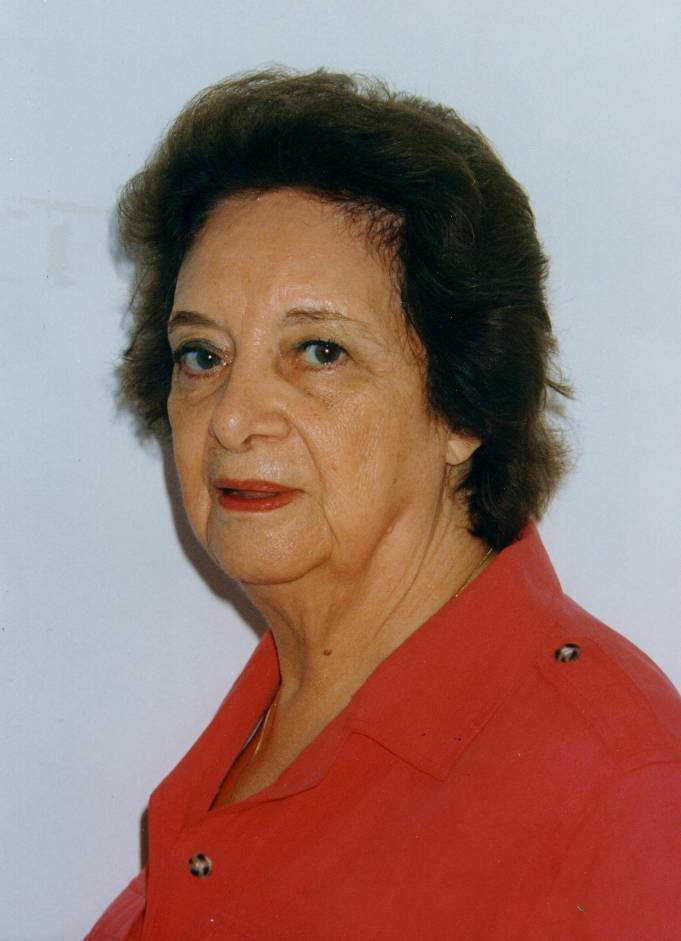

National Senator
- In office 1952–1955
- Constituency: Santa Fe

Personal details
- Born: 19 November 1926; Rosario, Argentina
- Died: 4 November 2007 (aged 80)

Hilda Nélida Castañeira de Baccaro (19 November 1926 – 4 November 2007) was an Argentine politician. She was elected to the Senate in 1951 as one of the first group of female parliamentarians in Argentina.

== Biography ==
Castañeira was born in Rosario in 1926. She studied at the Nuestra Señora del Huerto college in Rosario and became a primary school teacher in Ibarlucea. She later taught in Rosario and at the National Boys College. In 1945 she founded the Martín Fierro Institute for the Teaching of Folk Arts and Customs and began working at the Port of Rosario as secretary of the customs administrator.

In 1949 Castañeira was a founder member of the Female Peronist Party. Two years later in the 1951 legislative elections, she was one of six women elected to the Senate. She was the first woman to speak in the Senate, and became president of the Labour Committee and secretary of the External Relations Committee. She remained in office until 1955 when her term was ended early by the Revolución Libertadora.

She later became political secretary of the women's branch of the Peronist Party and served as a city councillor in Buenos Aires from 1973 to 1976. She died in November 2007.
