= Primavera de Rondônia =

Municipality in Rondônia, Brazil

- Municipality
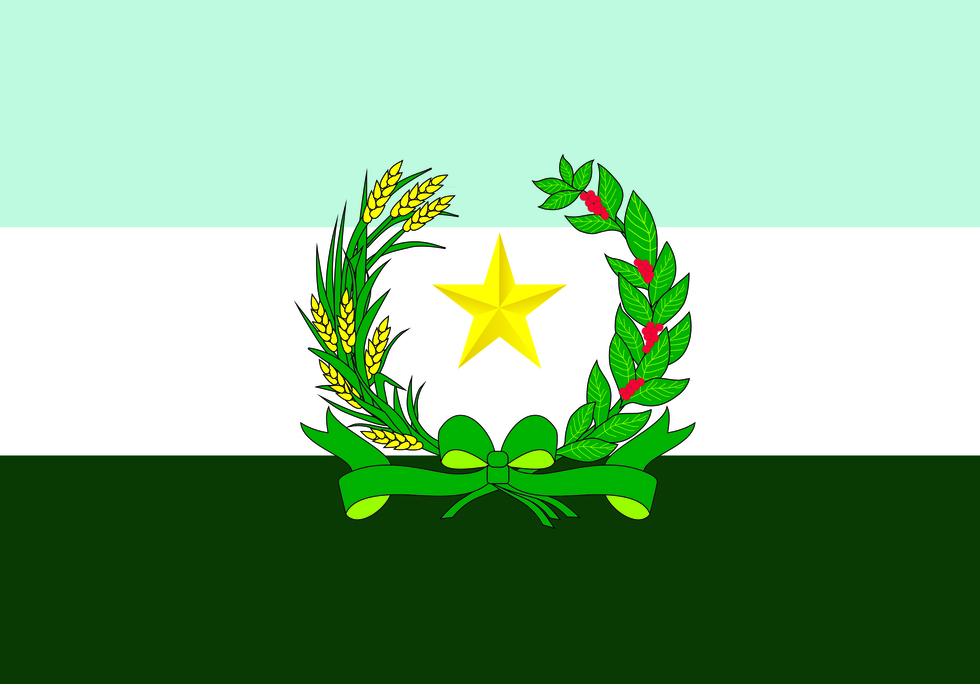
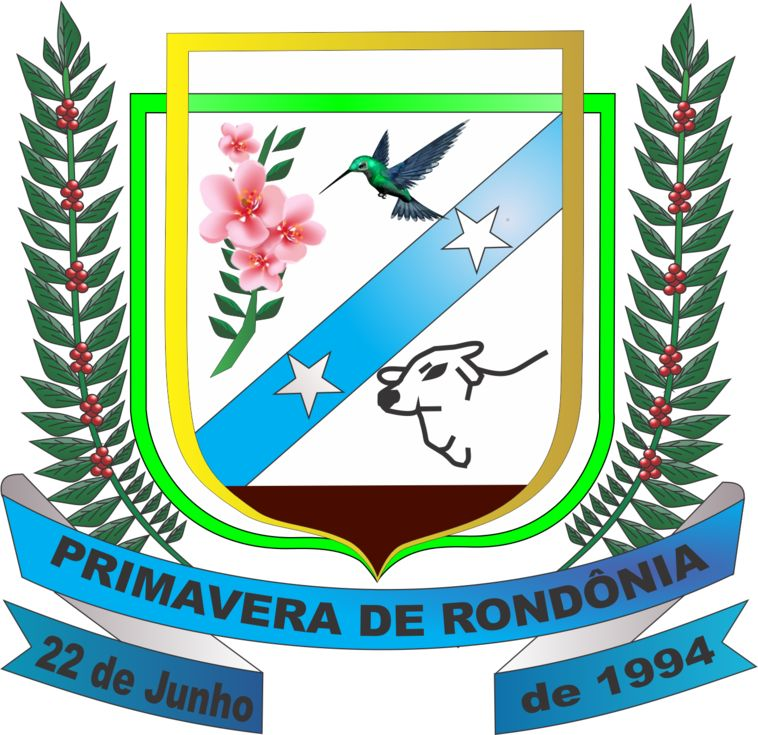
- Flag Coat of arms

- Location in Rondônia state

- Location in Brazil
- Coordinates: 11°49′1″S 61°19′22″W
- Country: Brazil
- Region: North
- State: Rondônia

Area
  - Total: 606 km^{2} (234 sq mi)

Population (2020)
  - Total: 2,776
  - Density: 4.58/km^{2} (11.9/sq mi)
- Time zone: UTC−4 (AMT)

Primavera de Rondônia (Rondônia Spring) is a municipality located in the Brazilian state of Rondônia. Its population was 2,776 (2020) and its area is 606 km^{2}.

== Geography ==
=== Climate ===
Primavera de Rondônia is classified as tropical savanna climate (Köppen climate classification: Aw).
