= Teixeirópolis =

Municipality in Rondônia, Brazil

- Municipality
- The Municipality of Teixeirópolis
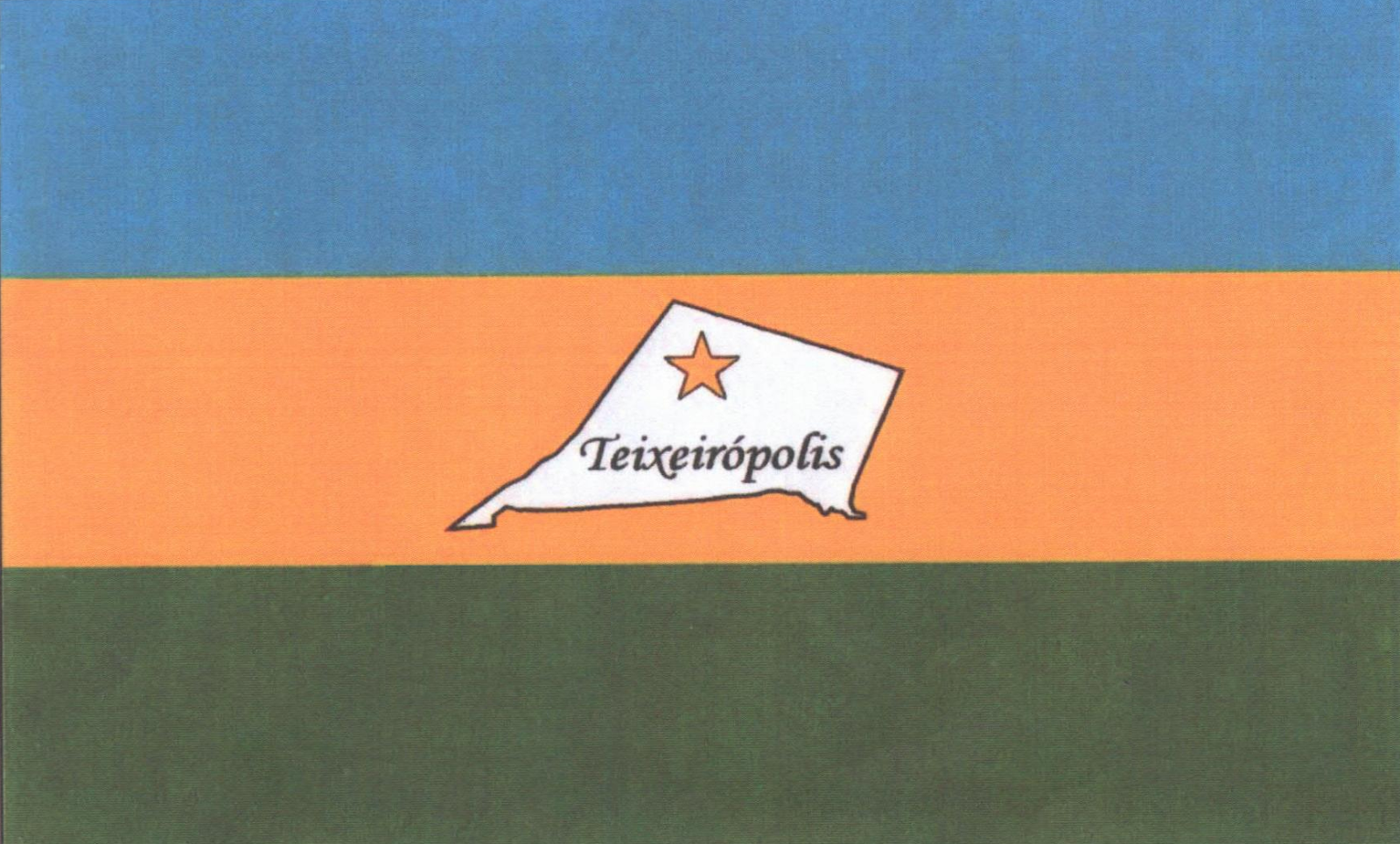
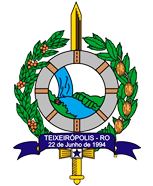
- Flag Coat of arms

- Location of Teixeirópolis in the State of Rondônia
- Coordinates: 10°55′03″S 62°14′58″W
- Country: Brazil
- Region: North
- State: Rondônia
- Founded: June 22, 1994

Government
  - Mayor: Antonio Zotesco (PT)

Area
  - Total: 459.954 km^{2} (177.589 sq mi)
- Elevation: 260 m (850 ft)

Population (2020)
  - Total: 4,233
  - Density: 9.203/km^{2} (23.84/sq mi)
- Time zone: UTC−4 (AMT)
- HDI (2000): 0.685 – medium

Teixeirópolis is a municipality located in the Brazilian state of Rondônia. Its population was 4,233 (2020) and its area is 460 km^{2}, which makes it the smallest municipality in that state.

== Geography ==
It is located at latitude 10º55'03" south and longitude 62º14'58" west, at an altitude of 260 meters.

== Population ==
Year	Residents
1991	5,244
2000	5,618
2010	4,888
2022	4,256
2025	4,521
