= Alvorada d'Oeste =

Municipality in Rondônia, Brazil

- Municipality
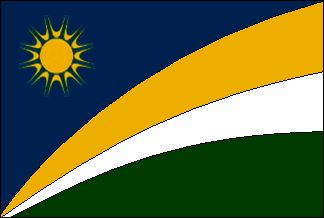
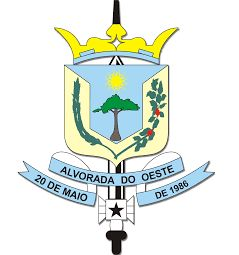
- Flag Coat of arms

- Location in Rondônia state

- Location in Brazil
- Coordinates: 11°20′29″S 62°17′11″W
- Country: Brazil
- Region: North
- State: Rondônia

Area
  - Total: 3,029 km^{2} (1,170 sq mi)

Population (2020)
  - Total: 14,106
  - Density: 4.657/km^{2} (12.06/sq mi)
- Time zone: UTC−4 (AMT)

Alvorada d'Oeste is a municipality located in the Brazilian state of Rondônia. Its population was 14,106 (2020) and its area is 3,029 km^{2}.

== See also ==
- List of municipalities in Rondônia
