= Parajís =

Coordinates: 42°43′N 6°57′W

Parajís (also known as Paraxís is a town belonging to the municipality of Balboa, in the region of El Bierzo (province of León, Autonomous Community of Castilla y León, Spain. It currently has a population of 20 inhabitants.

It is well known that the image stored in the chapel of the Guardian Angel representing the devil that is called "O Demin" (the devil or the devil in dialect Bierzo), "El Bierzo", Julio Alvarez Rubio ISBN 978-84-8012-652-6 which is located next to the image of the Angel de la Guarda. Both were great respect keep telling legends about them and their meaning (one of them, related to dialect Bierzo, the transcribe eben the book "El Bierzo" by Julia Alvarez Rubio. The age of the image of O Demin is uncertain, reflecting the very phrase that legend says"(...) and so much! Ao apparently xa was no tempo aiquí two Moura ".
