= Vale do Paraíso, Rondônia =

Municipality in Rondônia, Brazil

Vale do Paraíso
- Municipality
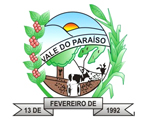
- Flag Coat of arms

- Location in Rondônia state

- Location in Brazil
- Coordinates: 10°26′52″S 62°8′3″W
- Country: Brazil
- Region: North
- State: Rondônia

Area
  - Total: 966 km^{2} (373 sq mi)

Population (2020)
  - Total: 6,656
  - Density: 6.89/km^{2} (17.8/sq mi)
- Time zone: UTC−4 (AMT)

Vale do Paraíso is a municipality located in the Brazilian state of Rondônia. Its population was 6,656 (2020) and its area is 966 km^{2}.
