= Theobroma, Rondônia =

Municipality in Rondônia, Brazil

Theobroma
- Municipality
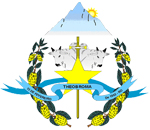
- Flag Coat of arms

- Location in Rondônia state

- Location in Brazil
- Coordinates: 10°14′20″S 62°21′30″W
- Country: Brazil
- Region: North
- State: Rondônia

Area
  - Total: 2,197 km^{2} (848 sq mi)

Population (2020)
  - Total: 10,395
  - Density: 4.731/km^{2} (12.25/sq mi)
- Time zone: UTC−4 (AMT)

Theobroma is a municipality in the Brazilian state of Rondônia. As of 2020, it had a population of 10,395 and covers an area of 2,197 km^{2}.

The municipality is named after the plant genus Theobroma, which includes the economically significant Theobroma cacao.
