= Castanheiro =

Castanheiro (Portuguese meaning the chestnut tree) may refer to the following places in Portugal:

- Castanheiro, a civil parish in the municipality of Carrazeda de Ansiães
- Castanheiro do Sul, a civil parish in the municipality of São João da Pesqueira
- Castanheiro Factory, a former industrial site in Guimarães
