= List of municipalities in Piauí =

This is a list of the municipalities in the state of Piauí (PI), located in the Northeast Region of Brazil. Piauí is divided into 224 municipalities, which are grouped into 15 microregions, which are grouped into 4 mesoregions.

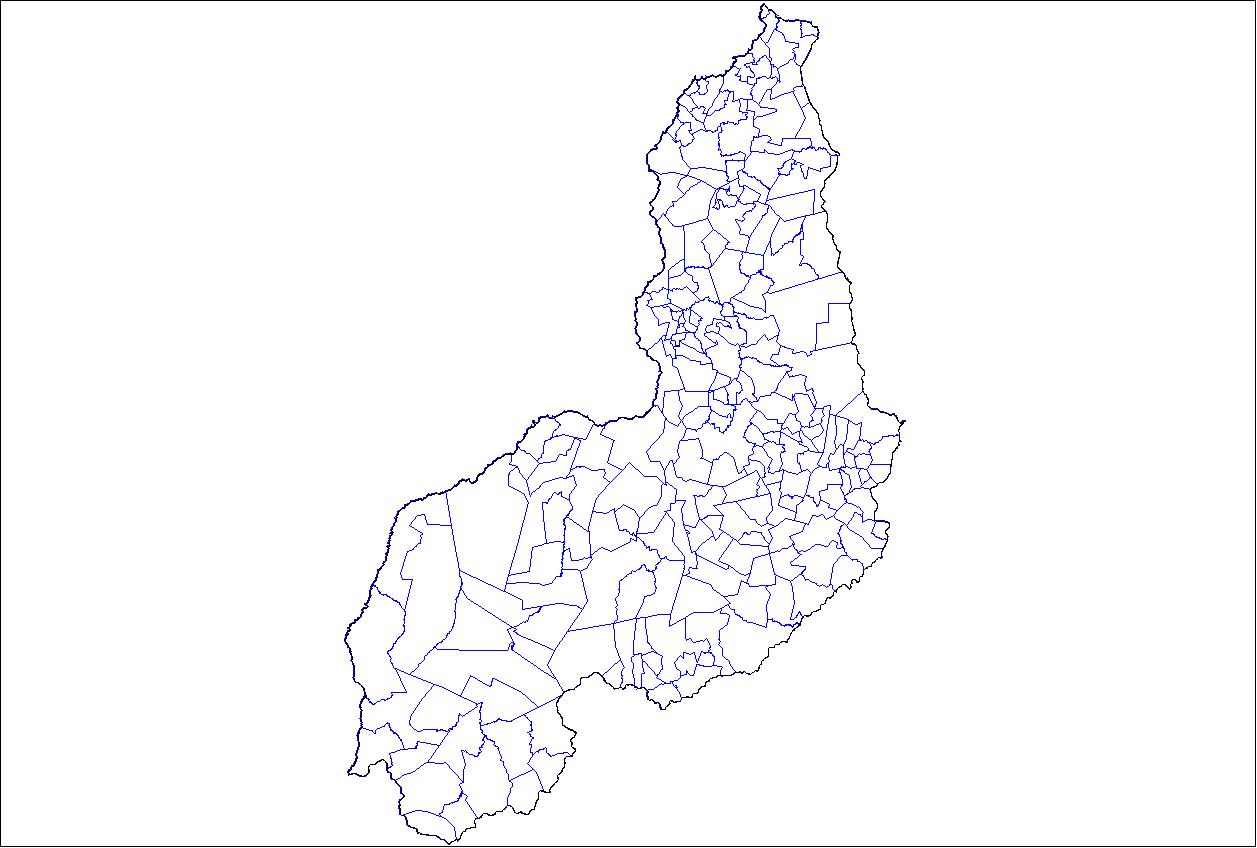
Municipalities of Piaui, Brazil

Mesoregion	Microregion	Municipality
Centro-Norte Piauiense	Campo Maior	Alto Longá
Centro-Norte Piauiense	Campo Maior	Assunção do Piauí
Centro-Norte Piauiense	Campo Maior	Boqueirão do Piauí
Centro-Norte Piauiense	Campo Maior	Buriti dos Montes
Centro-Norte Piauiense	Campo Maior	Campo Maior
Centro-Norte Piauiense	Campo Maior	Capitão de Campos
Centro-Norte Piauiense	Campo Maior	Castelo do Piauí
Centro-Norte Piauiense	Campo Maior	Cocal de Telha
Centro-Norte Piauiense	Campo Maior	Domingos Mourão
Centro-Norte Piauiense	Campo Maior	Jatobá do Piauí
Centro-Norte Piauiense	Campo Maior	Juazeiro do Piauí
Centro-Norte Piauiense	Campo Maior	Lagoa de São Francisco
Centro-Norte Piauiense	Campo Maior	Milton Brandão
Centro-Norte Piauiense	Campo Maior	Nossa Senhora de Nazaré
Centro-Norte Piauiense	Campo Maior	Novo Santo Antônio
Centro-Norte Piauiense	Campo Maior	Pau d'Arco do Piauí
Centro-Norte Piauiense	Campo Maior	Pedro II
Centro-Norte Piauiense	Campo Maior	São João da Serra
Centro-Norte Piauiense	Campo Maior	São Miguel do Tapuio
Centro-Norte Piauiense	Campo Maior	Sigefredo Pacheco
Centro-Norte Piauiense	Médio Parnaíba Piauiense	Agricolândia
Centro-Norte Piauiense	Médio Parnaíba Piauiense	Água Branca
Centro-Norte Piauiense	Médio Parnaíba Piauiense	Amarante
Centro-Norte Piauiense	Médio Parnaíba Piauiense	Angical do Piauí
Centro-Norte Piauiense	Médio Parnaíba Piauiense	Arraial
Centro-Norte Piauiense	Médio Parnaíba Piauiense	Barro Duro
Centro-Norte Piauiense	Médio Parnaíba Piauiense	Francisco Ayres
Centro-Norte Piauiense	Médio Parnaíba Piauiense	Hugo Napoleão
Centro-Norte Piauiense	Médio Parnaíba Piauiense	Jardim do Mulato
Centro-Norte Piauiense	Médio Parnaíba Piauiense	Lagoinha do Piauí
Centro-Norte Piauiense	Médio Parnaíba Piauiense	Olho d'Água do Piauí
Centro-Norte Piauiense	Médio Parnaíba Piauiense	Palmeirais
Centro-Norte Piauiense	Médio Parnaíba Piauiense	Passagem Franca do Piauí
Centro-Norte Piauiense	Médio Parnaíba Piauiense	Regeneração
Centro-Norte Piauiense	Médio Parnaíba Piauiense	Santo Antônio dos Milagres
Centro-Norte Piauiense	Médio Parnaíba Piauiense	São Gonçalo do Piauí
Centro-Norte Piauiense	Médio Parnaíba Piauiense	São Pedro do Piauí
Centro-Norte Piauiense	Teresina	Altos
Centro-Norte Piauiense	Teresina	Beneditinos
Centro-Norte Piauiense	Teresina	Coivaras
Centro-Norte Piauiense	Teresina	Curralinhos
Centro-Norte Piauiense	Teresina	Demerval Lobão
Centro-Norte Piauiense	Teresina	José de Freitas
Centro-Norte Piauiense	Teresina	Lagoa Alegre
Centro-Norte Piauiense	Teresina	Lagoa do Piauí
Centro-Norte Piauiense	Teresina	Miguel Leão
Centro-Norte Piauiense	Teresina	Monsenhor Gil
Centro-Norte Piauiense	Teresina	Nazária
Centro-Norte Piauiense	Teresina	Teresina (State Capital)
Centro-Norte Piauiense	Teresina	União
Centro-Norte Piauiense	Valença do Piaui	Aroazes
Centro-Norte Piauiense	Valença do Piaui	Barra d'Alcântara
Centro-Norte Piauiense	Valença do Piaui	Elesbão Veloso
Centro-Norte Piauiense	Valença do Piaui	Francinópolis
Centro-Norte Piauiense	Valença do Piaui	Inhuma
Centro-Norte Piauiense	Valença do Piaui	Lagoa do Sítio
Centro-Norte Piauiense	Valença do Piaui	Novo Oriente do Piauí
Centro-Norte Piauiense	Valença do Piaui	Pimenteiras
Centro-Norte Piauiense	Valença do Piaui	Prata do Piauí
Centro-Norte Piauiense	Valença do Piaui	Santa Cruz dos Milagres
Centro-Norte Piauiense	Valença do Piaui	São Félix do Piauí
Centro-Norte Piauiense	Valença do Piaui	São Miguel da Baixa Grande
Centro-Norte Piauiense	Valença do Piaui	Valença do Piauí
Centro-Norte Piauiense	Valença do Piaui	Várzea Grande
Norte Piauiense	Baixo Parnaíba Piauiense	Barras
Norte Piauiense	Baixo Parnaíba Piauiense	Batalha
Norte Piauiense	Baixo Parnaíba Piauiense	Boa Hora
Norte Piauiense	Baixo Parnaíba Piauiense	Brasileira
Norte Piauiense	Baixo Parnaíba Piauiense	Cabeceiras do Piauí
Norte Piauiense	Baixo Parnaíba Piauiense	Campo Largo do Piauí
Norte Piauiense	Baixo Parnaíba Piauiense	Esperantina
Norte Piauiense	Baixo Parnaíba Piauiense	Joaquim Pires
Norte Piauiense	Baixo Parnaíba Piauiense	Joca Marques
Norte Piauiense	Baixo Parnaíba Piauiense	Luzilândia
Norte Piauiense	Baixo Parnaíba Piauiense	Madeiro
Norte Piauiense	Baixo Parnaíba Piauiense	Matias Olímpio
Norte Piauiense	Baixo Parnaíba Piauiense	Miguel Alves
Norte Piauiense	Baixo Parnaíba Piauiense	Morro do Chapéu do Piauí
Norte Piauiense	Baixo Parnaíba Piauiense	Nossa Senhora dos Remédios
Norte Piauiense	Baixo Parnaíba Piauiense	Piripiri
Norte Piauiense	Baixo Parnaíba Piauiense	Porto
Norte Piauiense	Baixo Parnaíba Piauiense	São João do Arraial
Norte Piauiense	Litoral Piauiense	Bom Princípio do Piauí
Norte Piauiense	Litoral Piauiense	Buriti dos Lopes
Norte Piauiense	Litoral Piauiense	Cajueiro da Praia
Norte Piauiense	Litoral Piauiense	Caraúbas do Piauí
Norte Piauiense	Litoral Piauiense	Caxingó
Norte Piauiense	Litoral Piauiense	Cocal
Norte Piauiense	Litoral Piauiense	Cocal dos Alves
Norte Piauiense	Litoral Piauiense	Ilha Grande
Norte Piauiense	Litoral Piauiense	Luís Correia
Norte Piauiense	Litoral Piauiense	Murici dos Portelas
Norte Piauiense	Litoral Piauiense	Parnaíba
Norte Piauiense	Litoral Piauiense	Piracuruca
Norte Piauiense	Litoral Piauiense	São João da Fronteira
Norte Piauiense	Litoral Piauiense	São José do Divino
Sudeste Piauiense	Alto e Médio Canindé	Acauã
Sudeste Piauiense	Alto e Médio Canindé	Bela Vista do Piauí
Sudeste Piauiense	Alto e Médio Canindé	Belém do Piauí
Sudeste Piauiense	Alto e Médio Canindé	Betânia do Piauí
Sudeste Piauiense	Alto e Médio Canindé	Caldeirão Grande do Piauí
Sudeste Piauiense	Alto e Médio Canindé	Campinas do Piauí
Sudeste Piauiense	Alto e Médio Canindé	Campo Alegre do Fidalgo
Sudeste Piauiense	Alto e Médio Canindé	Campo Grande do Piauí
Sudeste Piauiense	Alto e Médio Canindé	Capitão Gervásio Oliveira
Sudeste Piauiense	Alto e Médio Canindé	Caridade do Piauí
Sudeste Piauiense	Alto e Médio Canindé	Conceição do Canindé
Sudeste Piauiense	Alto e Médio Canindé	Curral Novo do Piauí
Sudeste Piauiense	Alto e Médio Canindé	Floresta do Piauí
Sudeste Piauiense	Alto e Médio Canindé	Francisco Macêdo
Sudeste Piauiense	Alto e Médio Canindé	Fronteiras
Sudeste Piauiense	Alto e Médio Canindé	Isaías Coelho
Sudeste Piauiense	Alto e Médio Canindé	Itainópolis
Sudeste Piauiense	Alto e Médio Canindé	Jacobina do Piauí
Sudeste Piauiense	Alto e Médio Canindé	Jaicós
Sudeste Piauiense	Alto e Médio Canindé	João Costa
Sudeste Piauiense	Alto e Médio Canindé	Lagoa do Barro do Piauí
Sudeste Piauiense	Alto e Médio Canindé	Marcolândia
Sudeste Piauiense	Alto e Médio Canindé	Massapê do Piauí
Sudeste Piauiense	Alto e Médio Canindé	Nova Santa Rita
Sudeste Piauiense	Alto e Médio Canindé	Padre Marcos
Sudeste Piauiense	Alto e Médio Canindé	Paes Landim
Sudeste Piauiense	Alto e Médio Canindé	Patos do Piauí
Sudeste Piauiense	Alto e Médio Canindé	Paulistana
Sudeste Piauiense	Alto e Médio Canindé	Pedro Laurentino
Sudeste Piauiense	Alto e Médio Canindé	Queimada Nova
Sudeste Piauiense	Alto e Médio Canindé	Ribeira do Piauí
Sudeste Piauiense	Alto e Médio Canindé	Santo Inácio do Piauí
Sudeste Piauiense	Alto e Médio Canindé	São Francisco de Assis do Piauí
Sudeste Piauiense	Alto e Médio Canindé	São João do Piauí
Sudeste Piauiense	Alto e Médio Canindé	Simões
Sudeste Piauiense	Alto e Médio Canindé	Simplício Mendes
Sudeste Piauiense	Alto e Médio Canindé	Socorro do Piauí
Sudeste Piauiense	Alto e Médio Canindé	Vera Mendes
Sudeste Piauiense	Alto e Médio Canindé	Vila Nova do Piauí
Sudeste Piauiense	Picos	Aroeiras do Itaim
Sudeste Piauiense	Picos	Bocaina
Sudeste Piauiense	Picos	Cajazeiras do Piauí
Sudeste Piauiense	Picos	Colônia do Piauí
Sudeste Piauiense	Picos	Dom Expedito Lopes
Sudeste Piauiense	Picos	Geminiano
Sudeste Piauiense	Picos	Ipiranga do Piauí
Sudeste Piauiense	Picos	Oeiras
Sudeste Piauiense	Picos	Paquetá
Sudeste Piauiense	Picos	Picos
Sudeste Piauiense	Picos	Santa Cruz do Piauí
Sudeste Piauiense	Picos	Santa Rosa do Piauí
Sudeste Piauiense	Picos	Santana do Piauí
Sudeste Piauiense	Picos	São João da Canabrava
Sudeste Piauiense	Picos	São João da Varjota
Sudeste Piauiense	Picos	São José do Piauí
Sudeste Piauiense	Picos	São Luís do Piauí
Sudeste Piauiense	Picos	Sussuapara
Sudeste Piauiense	Picos	Tanque do Piauí
Sudeste Piauiense	Picos	Wall Ferraz
Sudeste Piauiense	Pio IX	Alagoinha do Piauí
Sudeste Piauiense	Pio IX	Alegrete do Piauí
Sudeste Piauiense	Pio IX	Francisco Santos
Sudeste Piauiense	Pio IX	Monsenhor Hipólito
Sudeste Piauiense	Pio IX	Pio IX
Sudeste Piauiense	Pio IX	Santo Antônio de Lisboa
Sudeste Piauiense	Pio IX	São Julião
Sudoeste Piauiense	Alto e Médio do Gurguéia	Alvorada do Gurguéia
Sudoeste Piauiense	Alto e Médio do Gurguéia	Barreiras do Piauí
Sudoeste Piauiense	Alto e Médio do Gurguéia	Bom Jesus
Sudoeste Piauiense	Alto e Médio do Gurguéia	Cristino Castro
Sudoeste Piauiense	Alto e Médio do Gurguéia	Currais
Sudoeste Piauiense	Alto e Médio do Gurguéia	Gilbués
Sudoeste Piauiense	Alto e Médio do Gurguéia	Monte Alegre do Piauí
Sudoeste Piauiense	Alto e Médio do Gurguéia	Palmeira do Piauí
Sudoeste Piauiense	Alto e Médio do Gurguéia	Redenção do Gurguéia
Sudoeste Piauiense	Alto e Médio do Gurguéia	Santa Luz
Sudoeste Piauiense	Alto e Médio do Gurguéia	São Gonçalo do Gurguéia
Sudoeste Piauiense	Alto Parnaíba Piauiense	Baixa Grande do Ribeiro
Sudoeste Piauiense	Alto Parnaíba Piauiense	Ribeiro Gonçalves
Sudoeste Piauiense	Alto Parnaíba Piauiense	Santa Filomena
Sudoeste Piauiense	Alto Parnaíba Piauiense	Uruçuí
Sudoeste Piauiense	Bertolínia	Antônio Almeida
Sudoeste Piauiense	Bertolínia	Bertolínia
Sudoeste Piauiense	Bertolínia	Colônia do Gurguéia
Sudoeste Piauiense	Bertolínia	Eliseu Martins
Sudoeste Piauiense	Bertolínia	Landri Sales
Sudoeste Piauiense	Bertolínia	Manoel Emídio
Sudoeste Piauiense	Bertolínia	Marcos Parente
Sudoeste Piauiense	Bertolínia	Porto Alegre do Piauí
Sudoeste Piauiense	Bertolínia	Sebastião Leal
Sudoeste Piauiense	Chapadas do Extremo Sul Piauiense	Avelino Lopes
Sudoeste Piauiense	Chapadas do Extremo Sul Piauiense	Corrente
Sudoeste Piauiense	Chapadas do Extremo Sul Piauiense	Cristalândia do Piauí
Sudoeste Piauiense	Chapadas do Extremo Sul Piauiense	Curimatá
Sudoeste Piauiense	Chapadas do Extremo Sul Piauiense	Júlio Borges
Sudoeste Piauiense	Chapadas do Extremo Sul Piauiense	Morro Cabeça no Tempo
Sudoeste Piauiense	Chapadas do Extremo Sul Piauiense	Parnaguá
Sudoeste Piauiense	Chapadas do Extremo Sul Piauiense	Riacho Frio
Sudoeste Piauiense	Chapadas do Extremo Sul Piauiense	Sebastião Barros
Sudoeste Piauiense	Floriano	Canavieira
Sudoeste Piauiense	Floriano	Flores do Piauí
Sudoeste Piauiense	Floriano	Floriano
Sudoeste Piauiense	Floriano	Guadalupe
Sudoeste Piauiense	Floriano	Itaueira
Sudoeste Piauiense	Floriano	Jerumenha
Sudoeste Piauiense	Floriano	Nazaré do Piauí
Sudoeste Piauiense	Floriano	Pavussu
Sudoeste Piauiense	Floriano	Rio Grande do Piauí
Sudoeste Piauiense	Floriano	São Francisco do Piauí
Sudoeste Piauiense	Floriano	São José do Peixe
Sudoeste Piauiense	Floriano	São Miguel do Fidalgo
Sudoeste Piauiense	São Raimundo Nonato	Anísio de Abreu
Sudoeste Piauiense	São Raimundo Nonato	Bonfim do Piauí
Sudoeste Piauiense	São Raimundo Nonato	Brejo do Piauí
Sudoeste Piauiense	São Raimundo Nonato	Canto do Buriti
Sudoeste Piauiense	São Raimundo Nonato	Caracol
Sudoeste Piauiense	São Raimundo Nonato	Coronel José Dias
Sudoeste Piauiense	São Raimundo Nonato	Dirceu Arcoverde
Sudoeste Piauiense	São Raimundo Nonato	Dom Inocêncio
Sudoeste Piauiense	São Raimundo Nonato	Fartura do Piauí
Sudoeste Piauiense	São Raimundo Nonato	Guaribas
Sudoeste Piauiense	São Raimundo Nonato	Jurema
Sudoeste Piauiense	São Raimundo Nonato	Pajeú do Piauí
Sudoeste Piauiense	São Raimundo Nonato	São Braz do Piauí
Sudoeste Piauiense	São Raimundo Nonato	São Lourenço do Piauí
Sudoeste Piauiense	São Raimundo Nonato	São Raimundo Nonato
Sudoeste Piauiense	São Raimundo Nonato	Tamboril do Piauí
Sudoeste Piauiense	São Raimundo Nonato	Várzea Branca

== See also ==
- Geography of Brazil
