= Elesbão Veloso =

Coordinates: 6°13′S 42°08′W

- Municipality
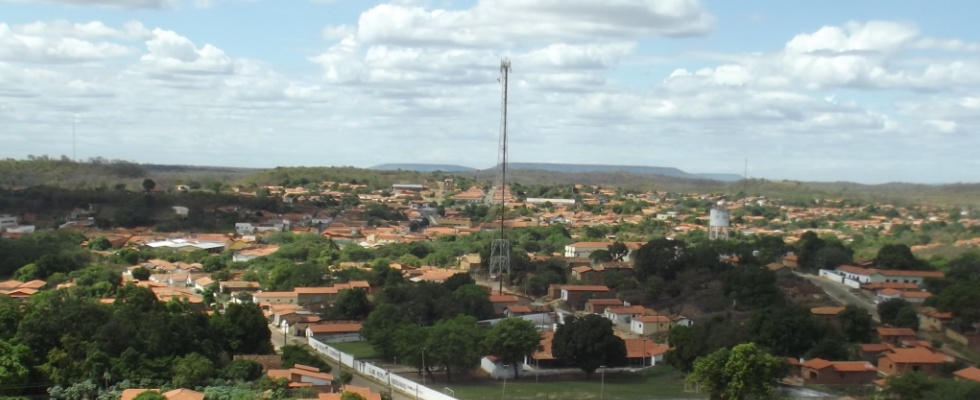
- View of Elesbão Veloso

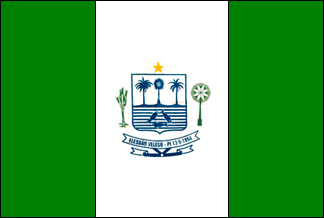
- Flag

- Country: Brazil
- Region: Nordeste
- State: Piauí
- Mesoregion: Centro-Norte Piauiense

Population (2020)
  - Total: 14,575
- Time zone: UTC−3 (BRT)

Elesbão Veloso is a municipality in the state of Piauí in the Northeast region of Brazil.

== See also ==
- List of municipalities in Piauí
