= Regeneração, Piauí =

Coordinates: 06°14′16″S 42°41′16″W

- Municipality
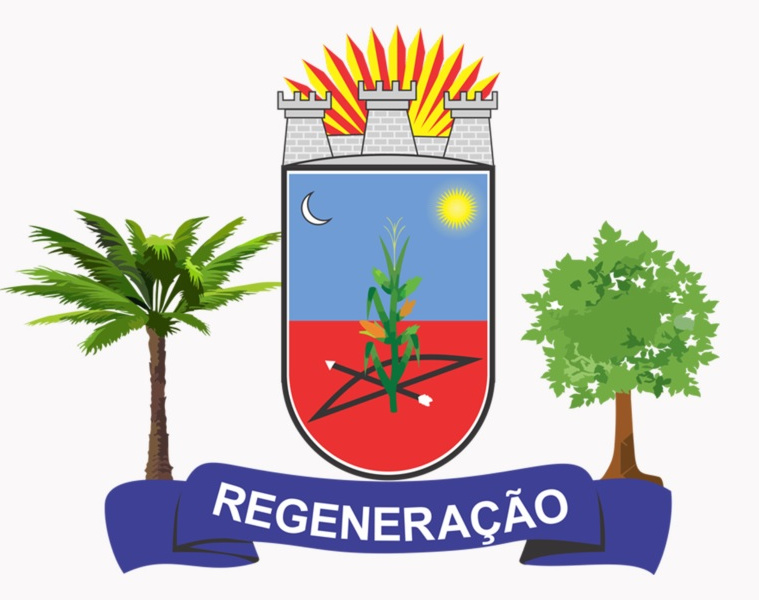
- Coat of arms

- Country: Brazil
- Region: Nordeste
- State: Piauí
- Mesoregion: Centro-Norte Piauiense

Population (2020)
  - Total: 17,979
- Time zone: UTC−3 (BRT)

Regeneração, Piauí is a municipality in the state of Piauí in the Northeast region of Brazil.

== See also ==
- List of municipalities in Piauí
