= Cocal de Telha =

Coordinates: 4.55889°S 41.9719°W

- Municipality
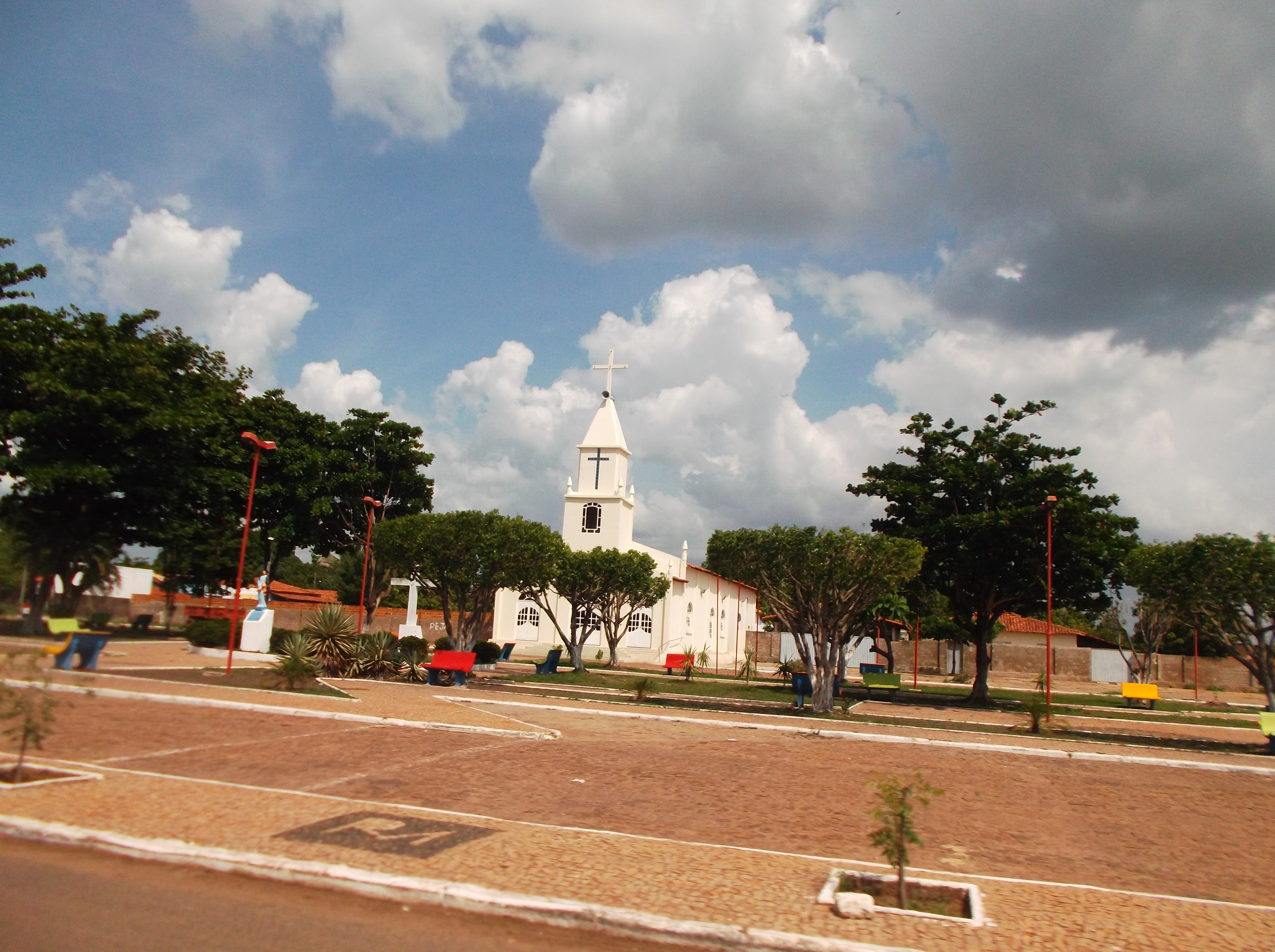

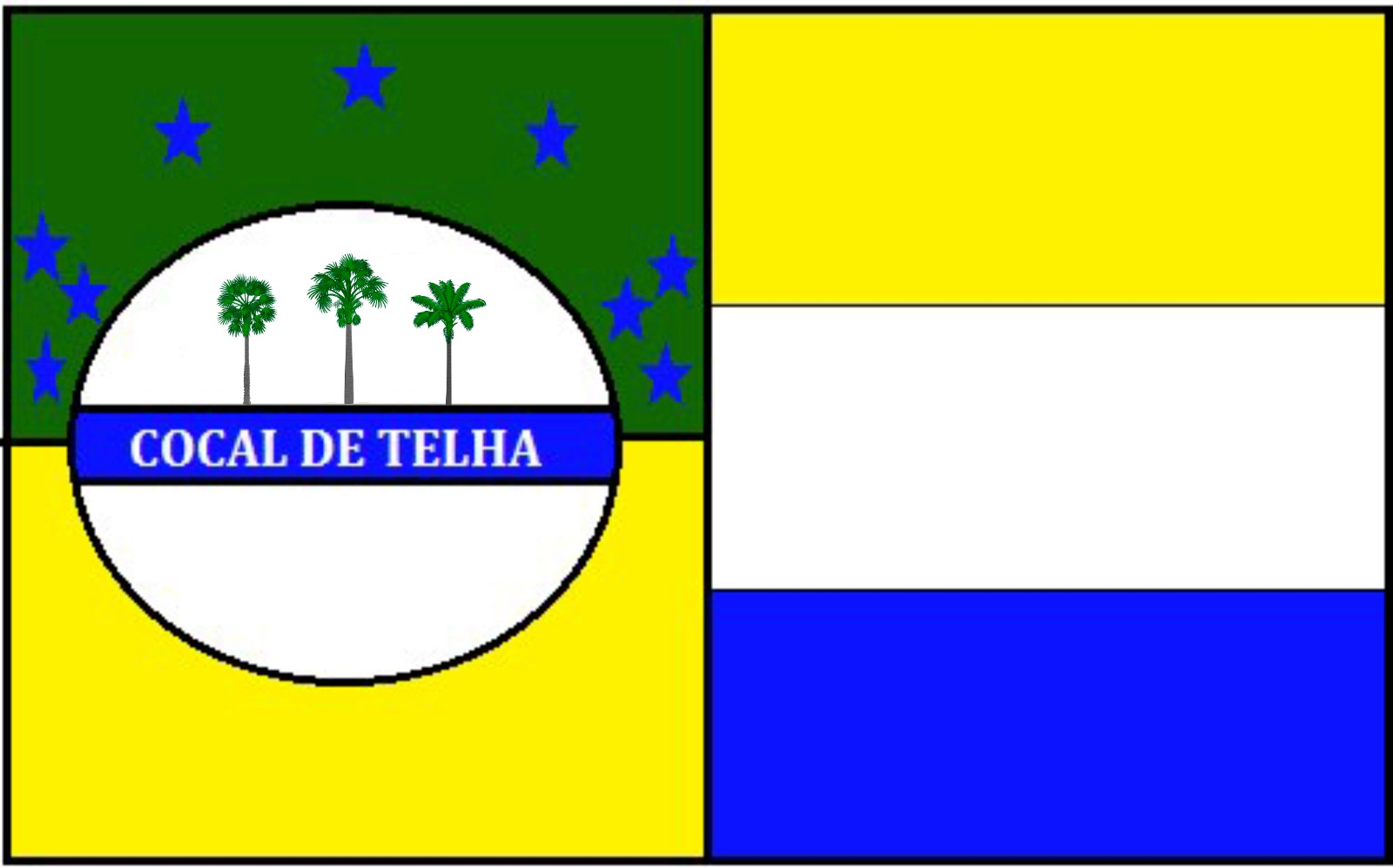
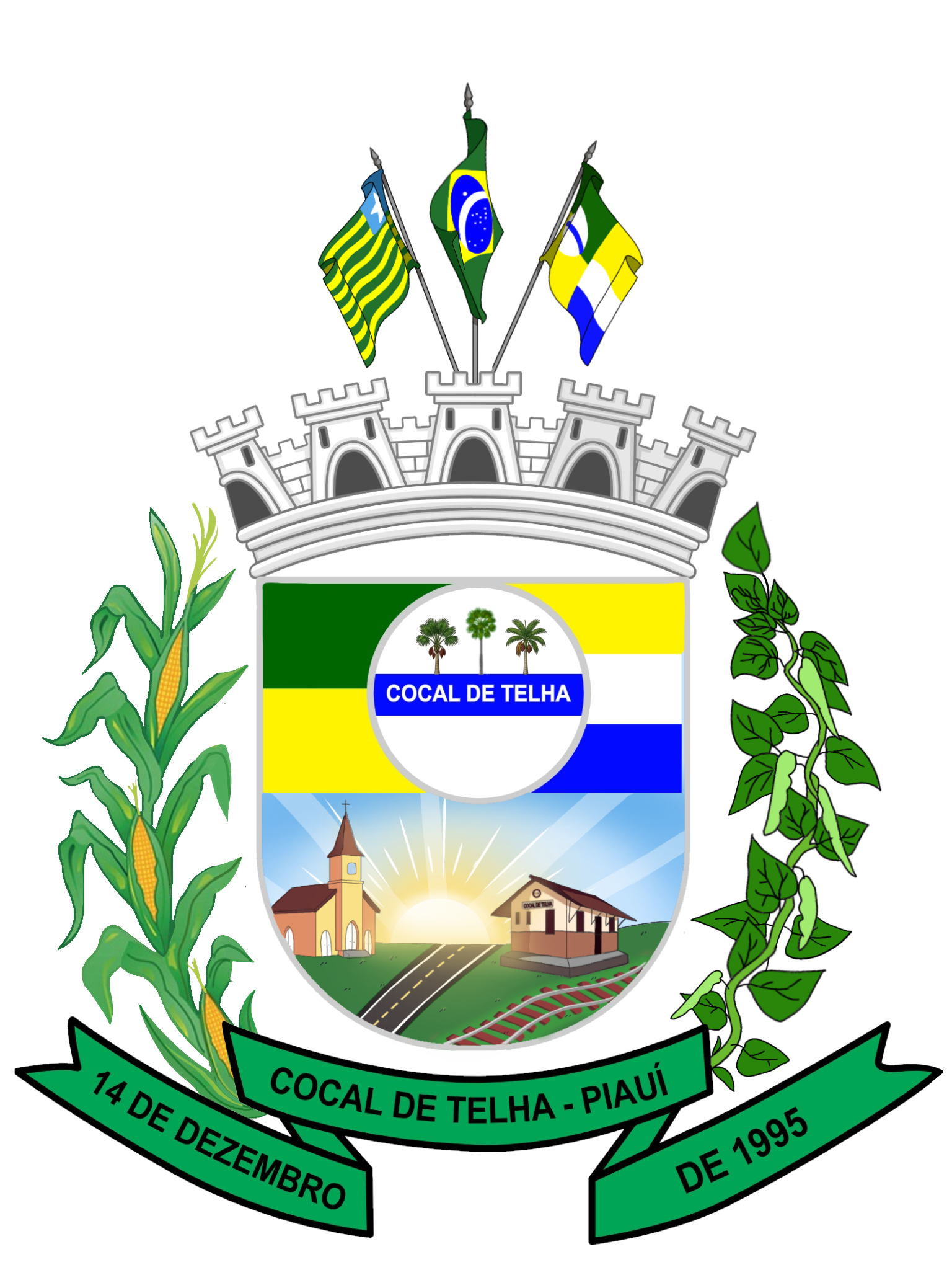
- Flag Coat of arms

- Country: Brazil
- Region: Northeast
- State: Piauí
- Mesoregion: Centro-Norte Piauiense

Population (2020)
  - Total: 4,899
- Time zone: UTC−3 (BRT)

Cocal de Telha is a municipality in the state of Piauí in the Northeast region of Brazil.

== See also ==
- List of municipalities in Piauí
