= Porto, Piauí =

Coordinates: 3°53′34″S 42°42′36″W

- Municipality
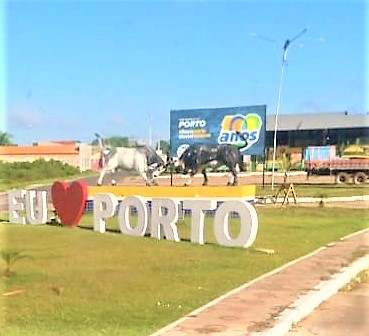

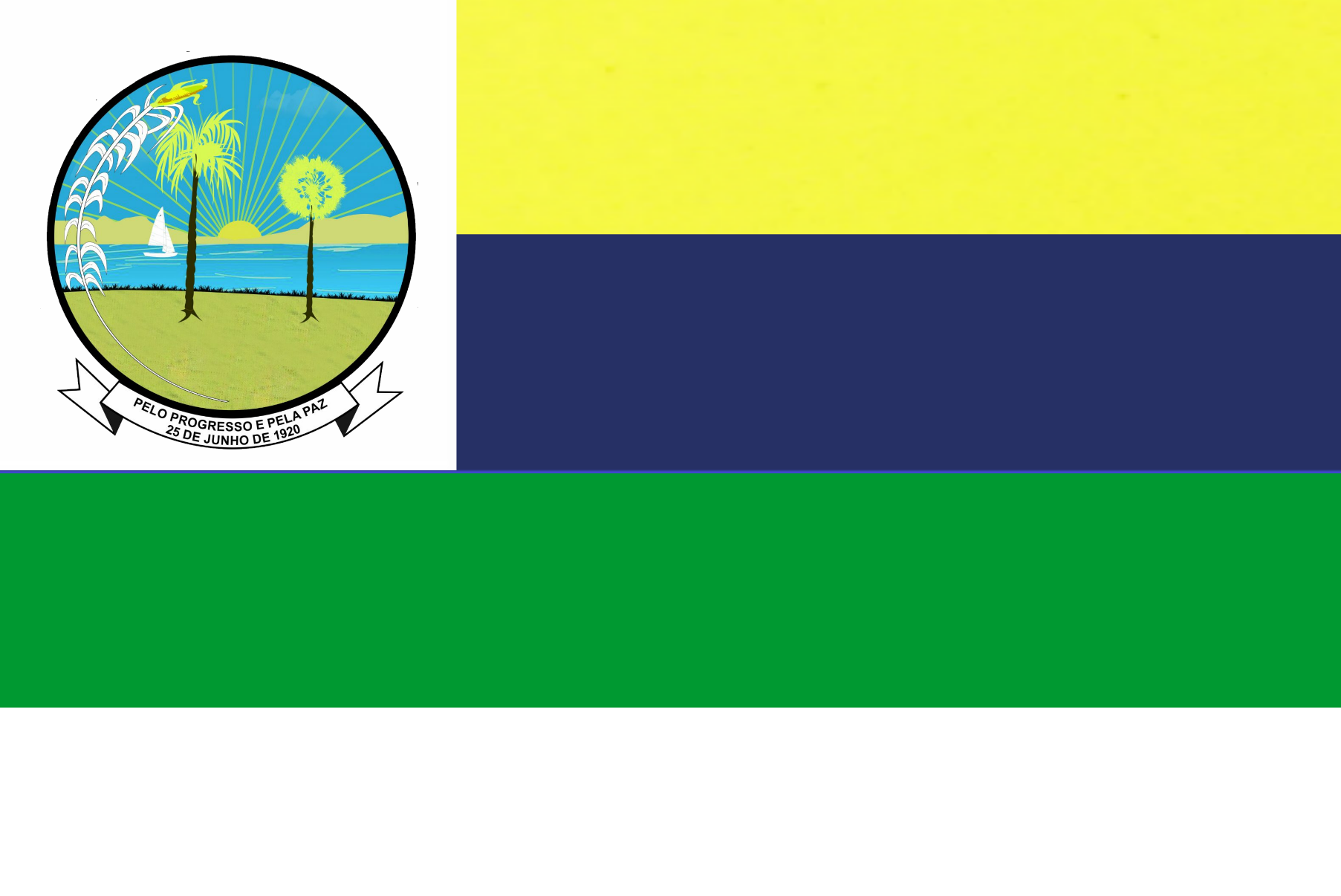
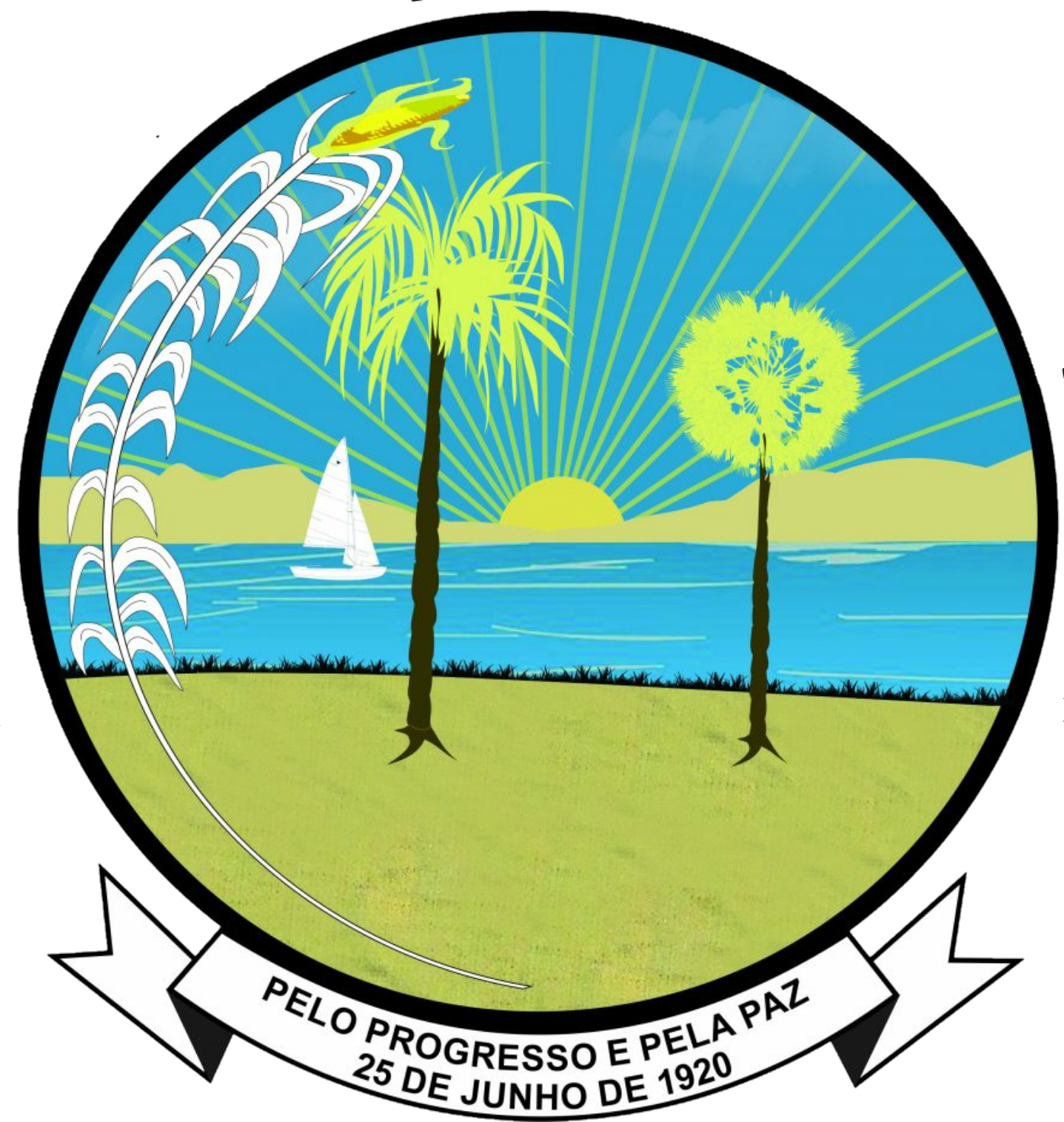
- Flag Coat of arms

- Country: Brazil
- Region: Nordeste
- State: Piauí
- Mesoregion: Norte Piauiense

Population (2020)
  - Total: 12,608
- Time zone: UTC−3 (BRT)

Porto, Piauí is a municipality in the state of Piauí in the Northeast region of Brazil.

== See also ==
- List of municipalities in Piauí
