= Porto Alegre do Piauí =

Coordinates: 6.96694°S 44.1819°W

- Municipality
- Country: Brazil
- Region: Nordeste
- State: Piauí
- Mesoregion: Sudoeste Piauiense

Population (2020)
  - Total: 2,720
- Time zone: UTC−3 (BRT)

Porto Alegre do Piauí is a municipality in the state of Piauí in the Northeast region of Brazil.

== See also ==
- List of municipalities in Piauí
