= Paquetá =

- Municipality
- Coordinates: 7°06′10″S 41°42′08″W
- Country: Brazil
- Region: Nordeste
- State: Piauí
- Mesoregion: Sudeste Piauiense

Population (2020)
  - Total: 3,937
- Time zone: UTC−3 (BRT)

Paquetá is a municipality in the state of Piauí in the Northeast region of Brazil.

== Population ==
As per census 2022, Paquetá has a population of 3813.

== See also ==
- List of municipalities in Piauí
