= Lagoa do Sítio =

Coordinates: 6°30′S 41°34′W

- Municipality
- Country: Brazil
- Region: Nordeste
- State: Piauí
- Mesoregion: Centro-Norte Piauiense

Population (2020)
  - Total: 5,198
- Time zone: UTC−3 (BRT)

Lagoa do Sítio is a municipality in the state of Piauí in the Northeast region of Brazil.

== See also ==
- List of municipalities in Piauí
