= Aroazes =

Coordinates: 6°07′S 41°48′W

Aroazes Teresina
- Municipality
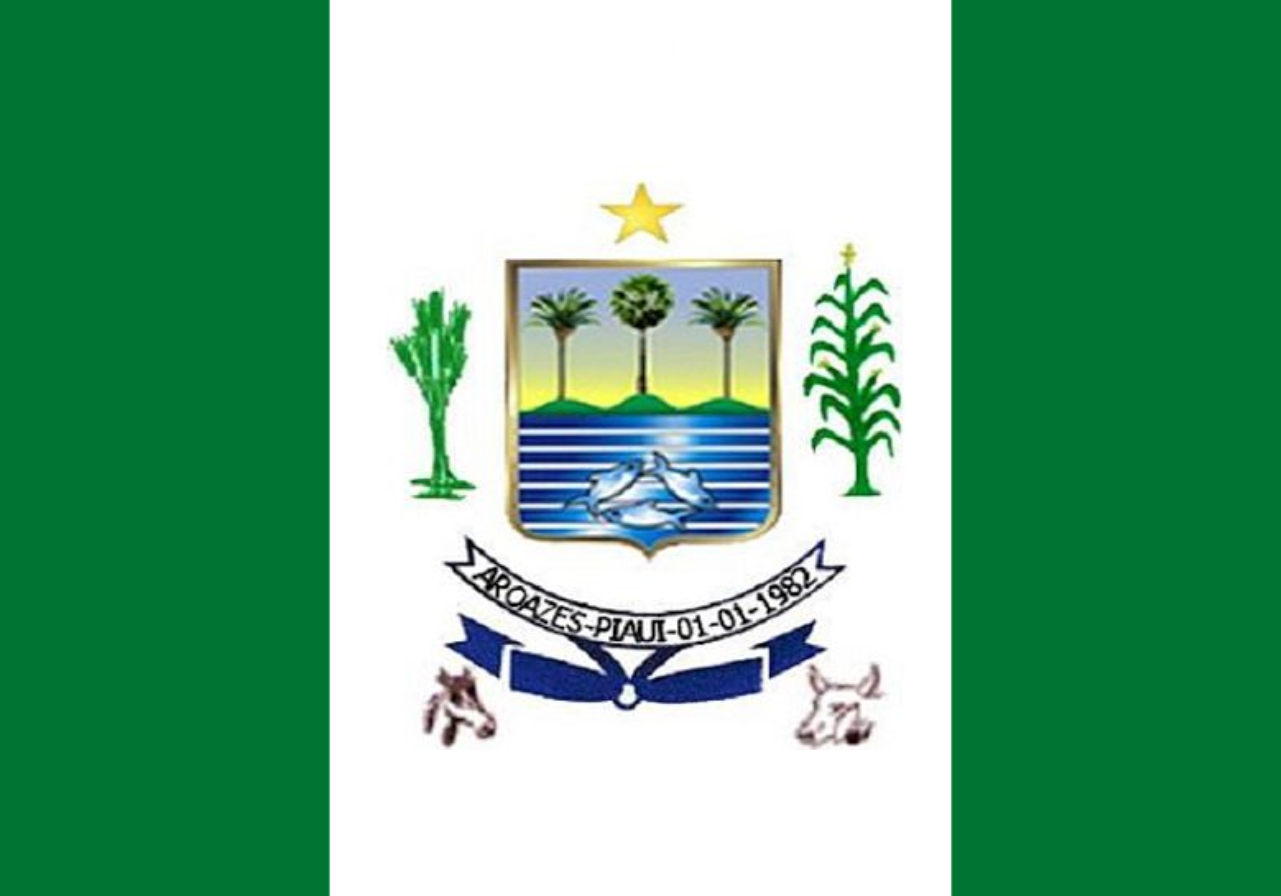
- Flag

- Country: Brazil
- Region: Nordeste
- State: Piauí
- Mesoregion: Centro-Norte Piauiense

Population (2020)
  - Total: 5,827
- Time zone: UTC−3 (BRT)

Aroazes is a municipality in the state of Piauí in the Northeast region of Brazil.

== See also ==
- List of municipalities in Piauí
