= Madeiro =

Coordinates: 3°29′S 40°16′W

- Municipality
- Country: Brazil
- Region: Nordeste
- State: Piauí
- Mesoregion: Norte Piauiense

Population (2020)
  - Total: 8,342
- Time zone: UTC−3 (BRT)

Madeiro is a municipality in the state of Piauí in the Northeast region of Brazil.

== See also ==
- List of municipalities in Piauí
