= Sussuapara =

Coordinates: 7.04278°S 41.3839°W

- Municipality
- Country: Brazil
- Region: Nordeste
- State: Piauí
- Mesoregion: Sudeste Piauiense

Population (2020)
  - Total: 6,767
- Time zone: UTC−3 (BRT)

Sussuapara is a municipality in the state of Piauí in the Northeast region of Brazil.

== See also ==
- List of municipalities in Piauí
