= Itaueira =

Coordinates: 7°36′S 43°02′W

- Municipality
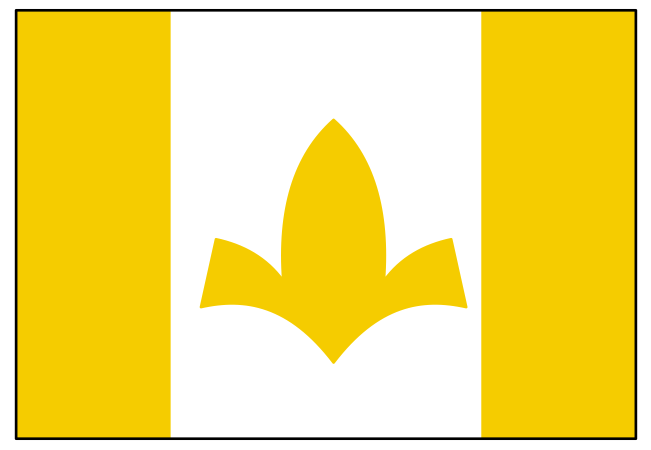
- Flag

- Country: Brazil
- Region: Nordeste
- State: Piauí
- Mesoregion: Sudoeste Piauiense

Population (2020)
  - Total: 11,028
- Time zone: UTC−3 (BRT)

Itaueira is a municipality in the state of Piauí in the Northeast region of Brazil.

== See also ==
- List of municipalities in Piauí
