= São Luís do Piauí =

Coordinates: 6°49′30″S 41°19′26″W

- Municipality
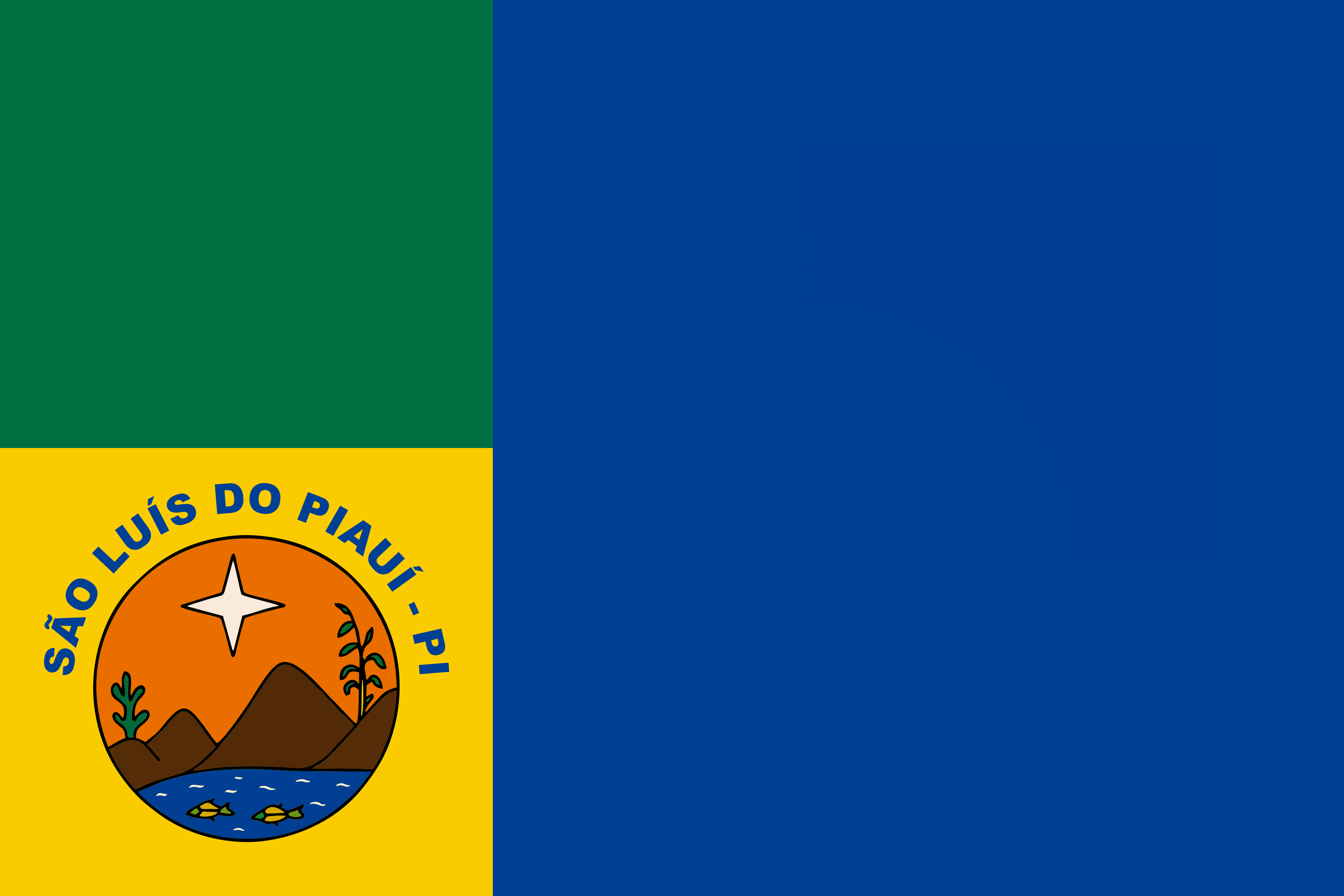
- Flag

- Country: Brazil
- Region: Nordeste
- State: Piauí
- Mesoregion: Sudeste Piauiense

Population (2010)
  - Total: 2,561
- Time zone: UTC−3 (BRT)

São Luís do Piauí is a municipality in the state of Piauí in the Northeast region of Brazil.

== See also ==
- List of municipalities in Piauí
