= Riacho Frio =

Coordinates: 10.125°S 44.9528°W

- Municipality
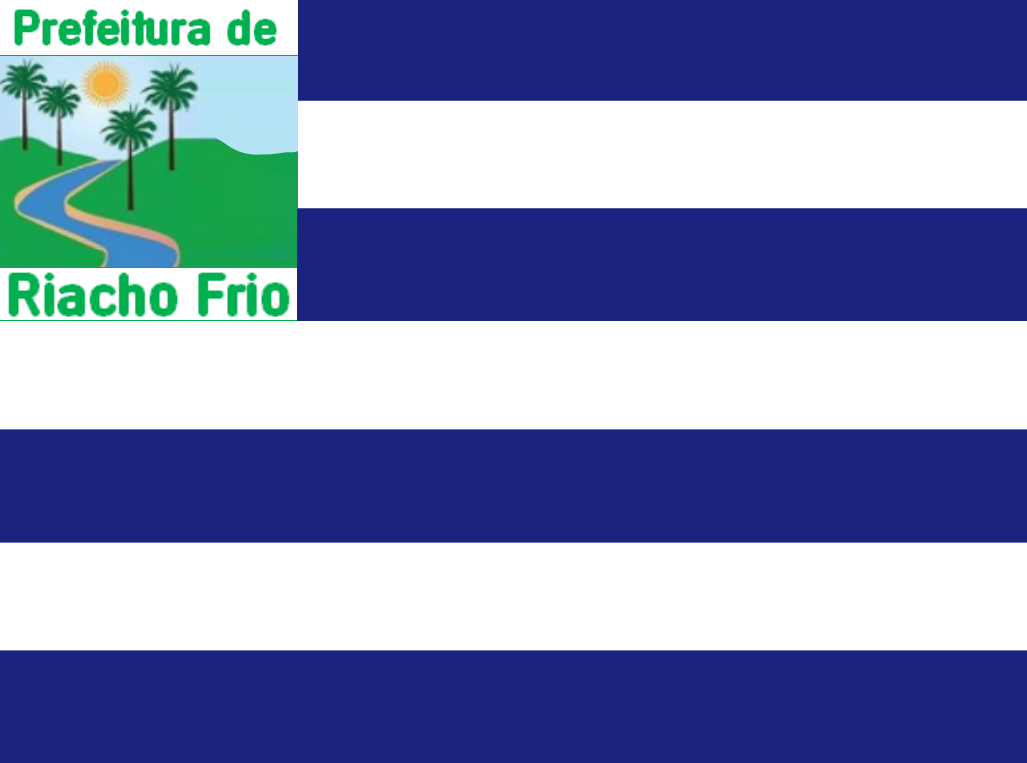
- Flag

- Country: Brazil
- Region: Northeast
- State: Piauí
- Mesoregion: Sudoeste Piauiense

Population (2020)
  - Total: 4,309
- Time zone: UTC−3 (BRT)

Riacho Frio is a municipality in the state of Piauí in the Northeast region of Brazil.

== See also ==
- List of municipalities in Piauí
