= Floresta do Piauí =

Coordinates: 7.46889°S 41.7939°W

- Municipality
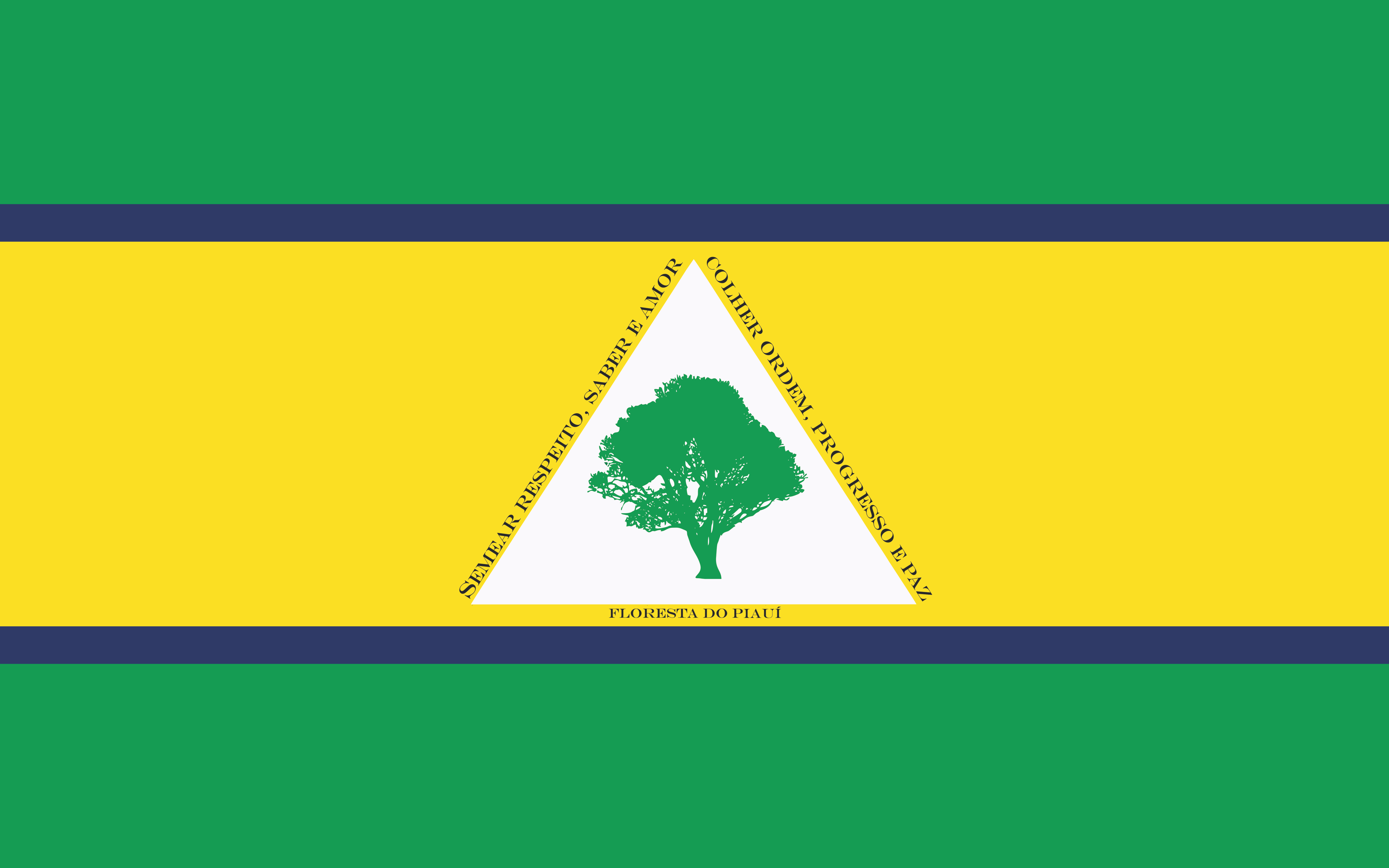
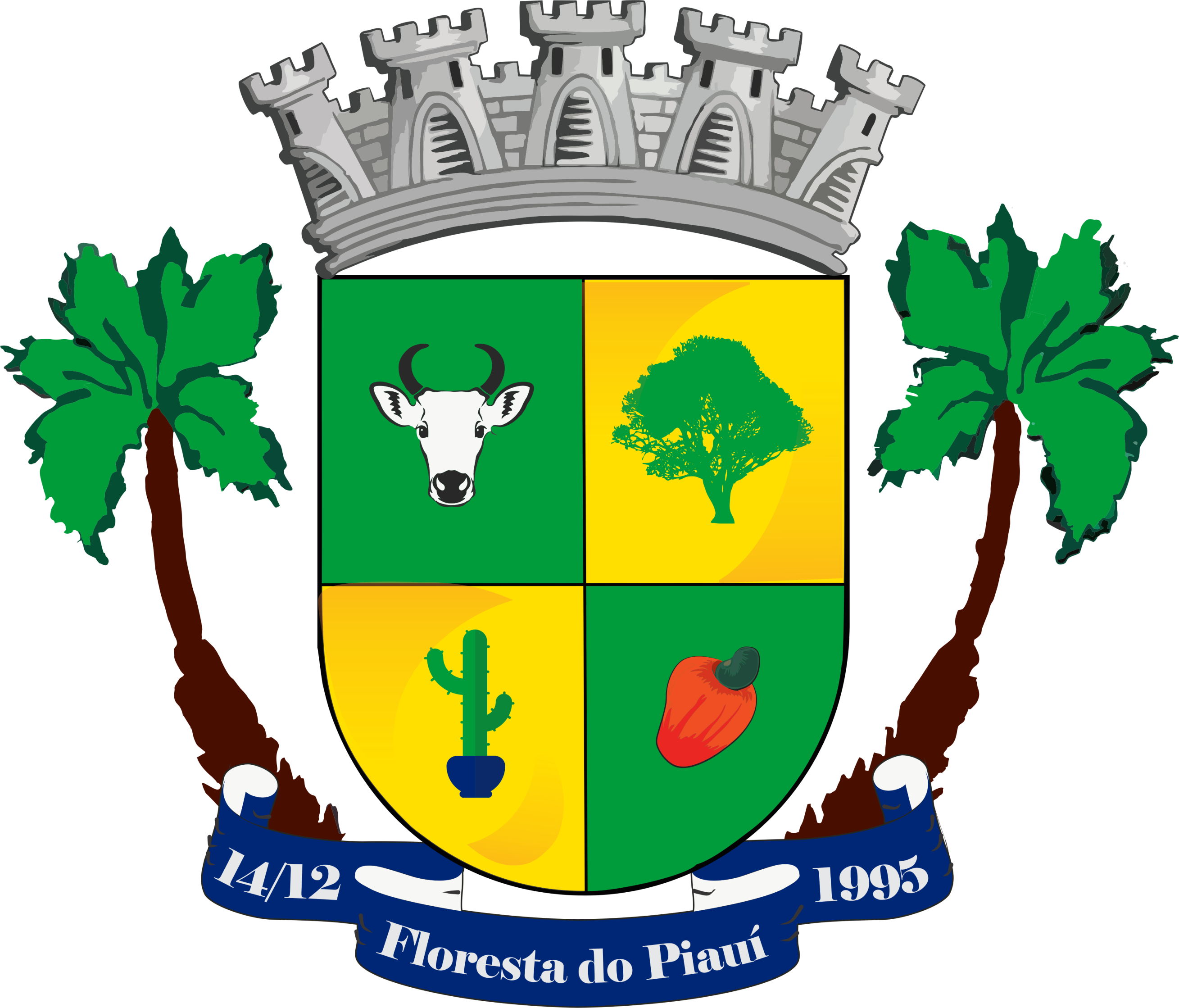
- Flag Coat of arms

- Country: Brazil
- Region: Nordeste
- State: Piauí
- Mesoregion: Sudeste Piauiense

Population (2020)
  - Total: 2,560
- Time zone: UTC−3 (BRT)

Floresta do Piauí is a municipality in the state of Piauí in the Northeast region of Brazil.

== See also ==
- List of municipalities in Piauí
