= Murici dos Portelas =

- Municipality
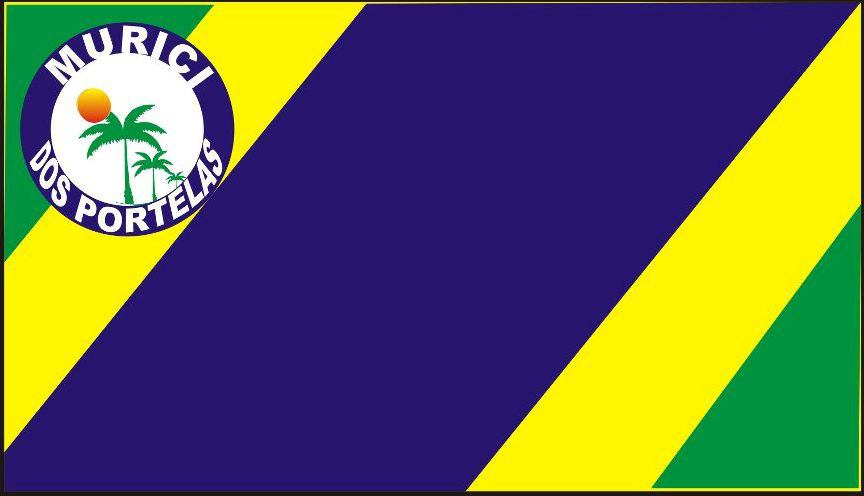
- Flag

- Location in Brazil
- Coordinates: 3°19′26″S 42°05′26″W
- Country: Brazil
- Region: Nordeste
- State: Piauí
- Mesoregion: Norte Piauiense

Population (2020)
  - Total: 9,209
- Time zone: UTC−3 (BRT)

Murici dos Portelas is a municipality in the state of Piauí in the Northeast region of Brazil.

== See also ==
- List of municipalities in Piauí
