= Júlio Borges =

Coordinates: 10.3228°S 44.2378°W

- Municipality
- Country: Brazil
- Region: Northeast
- State: Piauí
- Mesoregion: Southeast

Population (2020)
  - Total: 5,640
- Time zone: UTC−3 (BRT)
- Postal code: 64963/000
- Area code: +55 89

Júlio Borges is a municipality in the state of Piauí in the Northeast region of Brazil.

== See also ==
- List of municipalities in Piauí
