= Olho d'Água do Piauí =

Coordinates: 5.84083°S 42.575°W

- Municipality
- Country: Brazil
- Region: Nordeste
- State: Piauí
- Mesoregion: Centro-Norte Piauiense

Population (2020)
  - Total: 2,468
- Time zone: UTC−3 (BRT)

Olho d'Água do Piauí is a municipality in the state of Piauí in the Northeast region of Brazil.

== See also ==
- List of municipalities in Piauí
