= João Costa, Piauí =

Coordinates: 8.51083°S 42.4139°W

João Costa
- Municipality
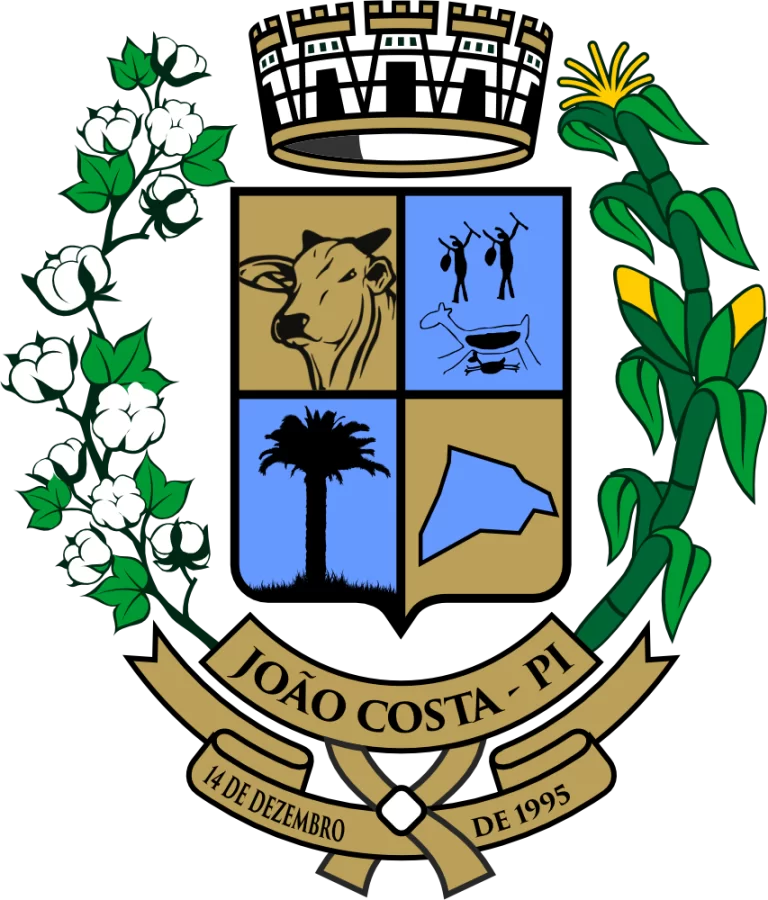
- Flag Coat of arms

- Country: Brazil
- Region: Nordeste
- State: Piauí
- Mesoregion: Sudeste Piauiense

Population (2020)
  - Total: 3,005
- Time zone: UTC−3 (BRT)

João Costa is a municipality in the state of Piauí in the Northeast region of Brazil.

== See also ==
- List of municipalities in Piauí
