= Morro do Chapéu do Piauí =

Coordinates: 3.74278°S 42.3119°W

- Municipality
- Country: Brazil
- Region: Nordeste
- State: Piauí
- Mesoregion: Norte Piauiense

Population (2020)
  - Total: 6,811
- Time zone: UTC−3 (BRT)

Morro do Chapéu do Piauí is a municipality in the state of Piauí in the Northeast Region of Brazil.

== See also ==
- List of municipalities in Piauí
