= Sebastião Barros =

Coordinates: 10.8169°S 44.8339°W

- Municipality
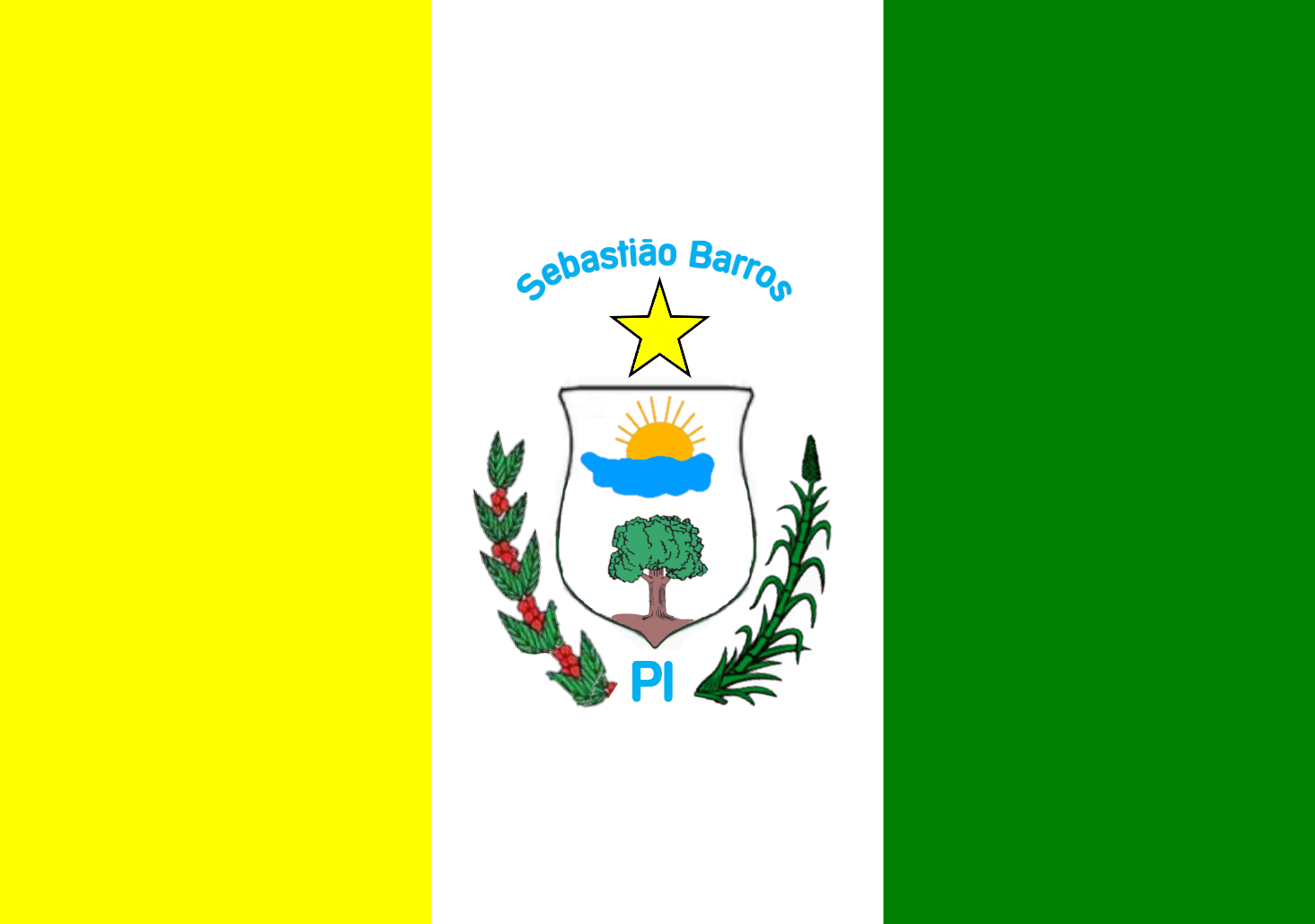
- Flag

- Country: Brazil
- Region: Nordeste
- State: Piauí
- Mesoregion: Sudoeste Piauiense

Population (2020)
  - Total: 3,451
- Time zone: UTC−3 (BRT)

Sebastião Barros is a municipality in the state of Piauí in the Northeast region of Brazil.

== See also ==
- List of municipalities in Piauí
