= Bocaina, Piauí =

Coordinates: 6.94278°S 41.3228°W

Bocaina (Piauí)
- Municipality
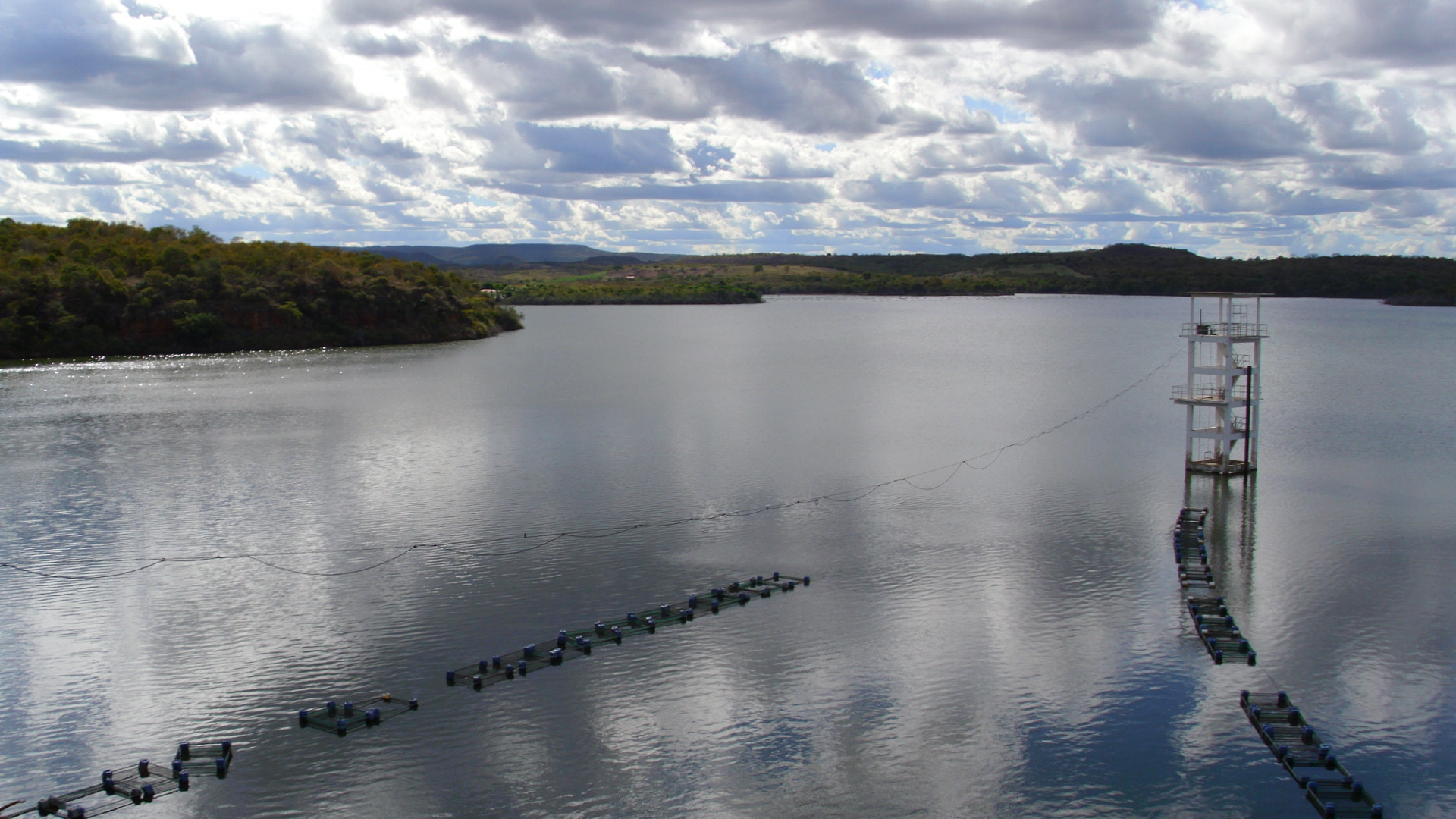

- Country: Brazil
- Region: Nordeste
- State: Piauí
- Mesoregion: Sudeste Piauiense

Population (2020)
  - Total: 4,505
- Time zone: UTC−3 (BRT)

Bocaina is a municipality in the state of Piauí in the Northeast region of Brazil.

== See also ==
- List of municipalities in Piauí
