= Wall Ferraz =

Coordinates: 7.23278°S 41.91°W

- Municipality
- Country: Brazil
- Region: Nordeste
- State: Piauí
- Mesoregion: Sudeste Piauiense
- Elevation: 520 ft (160 m)

Population (2020)
  - Total: 4,471
- Time zone: UTC−3 (BRT)

Wall Ferraz is a municipality in the state of Piauí in the Northeast region of Brazil.

== See also ==
- List of municipalities in Piauí
