= Nova Santa Rita, Piauí =

Coordinates: 8°05′13″S 42°03′07″W

- Municipality
- Country: Brazil
- Region: Nordeste
- State: Piauí
- Mesoregion: Sudeste Piauiense

Population (2020)
  - Total: 4,383
- Time zone: UTC−3 (BRT)

Nova Santa Rita, Piauí is a municipality in the state of Piauí in the Northeast region of Brazil.

== See also ==
- List of municipalities in Piauí
