= Arraial =

Coordinates: 6.655°S 42.5319°W

- Municipality
- Country: Brazil
- Region: Nordeste
- State: Piauí
- Mesoregion: Centro-Norte Piauiense
- Microregion: Medio Parnaíba Piauiense
- Established: 9 December 1964

Area
  - Total: 245.491 sq mi (635.818 km^{2})

Population (2020)
  - Total: 4,720
  - Density: 19.2/sq mi (7.42/km^{2})
- Time zone: UTC−3 (BRT)

Arraial is a municipality in the state of Piauí in the Northeast region of Brazil.

== See also ==
- List of municipalities in Piauí
