= Várzea Grande, Piauí =

- Municipality
- Within Piauí
- Coordinates: 06°32′42″S 42°14′45″W
- Country: Brazil
- Region: Nordeste
- State: Piauí
- Mesoregion: Centro-Norte Piauiense
- Established: 08/12

Government
  - Prefect: Luis Nunes Ribeiro Filho

Area
  - Total: 90.320 sq mi (233.927 km^{2})
- Elevation: 804 ft (245 m)

Population (2020)
  - Total: 4,336
- Time zone: UTC−3 (BRT)

Várzea Grande, Piauí is a municipality in the state of Piauí in the Northeast region of Brazil.

== See also ==
- List of municipalities in Piauí
