= Morro Cabeça no Tempo =

Coordinates: 9.725°S 43.9008°W

- Municipality
- Country: Brazil
- Region: Northeast
- State: Piauí
- Mesoregion: Southeast

Population (2020)
  - Total: 4,530
- Time zone: UTC−3 (BRT)
- Postal code: 64968/000
- Area code: +55 89

Morro Cabeça no Tempo is a municipality in the state of Piauí in the Northeast region of Brazil.

== See also ==
- List of municipalities in Piauí
