= Francinópolis =

Coordinates: 6°26′S 42°16′W

- Municipality
- Country: Brazil
- Region: Nordeste
- State: Piauí
- Mesoregion: Centro-Norte Piauiense

Population (2010)
  - Total: 5,235
- Time zone: UTC−3 (BRT)

Francinópolis is a municipality in the state of Piauí in the Northeast region of Brazil.

== See also ==
- List of municipalities in Piauí
