= Acauã =

Coordinates: 8°12′54″S 41°04′55″W

- Municipality and town
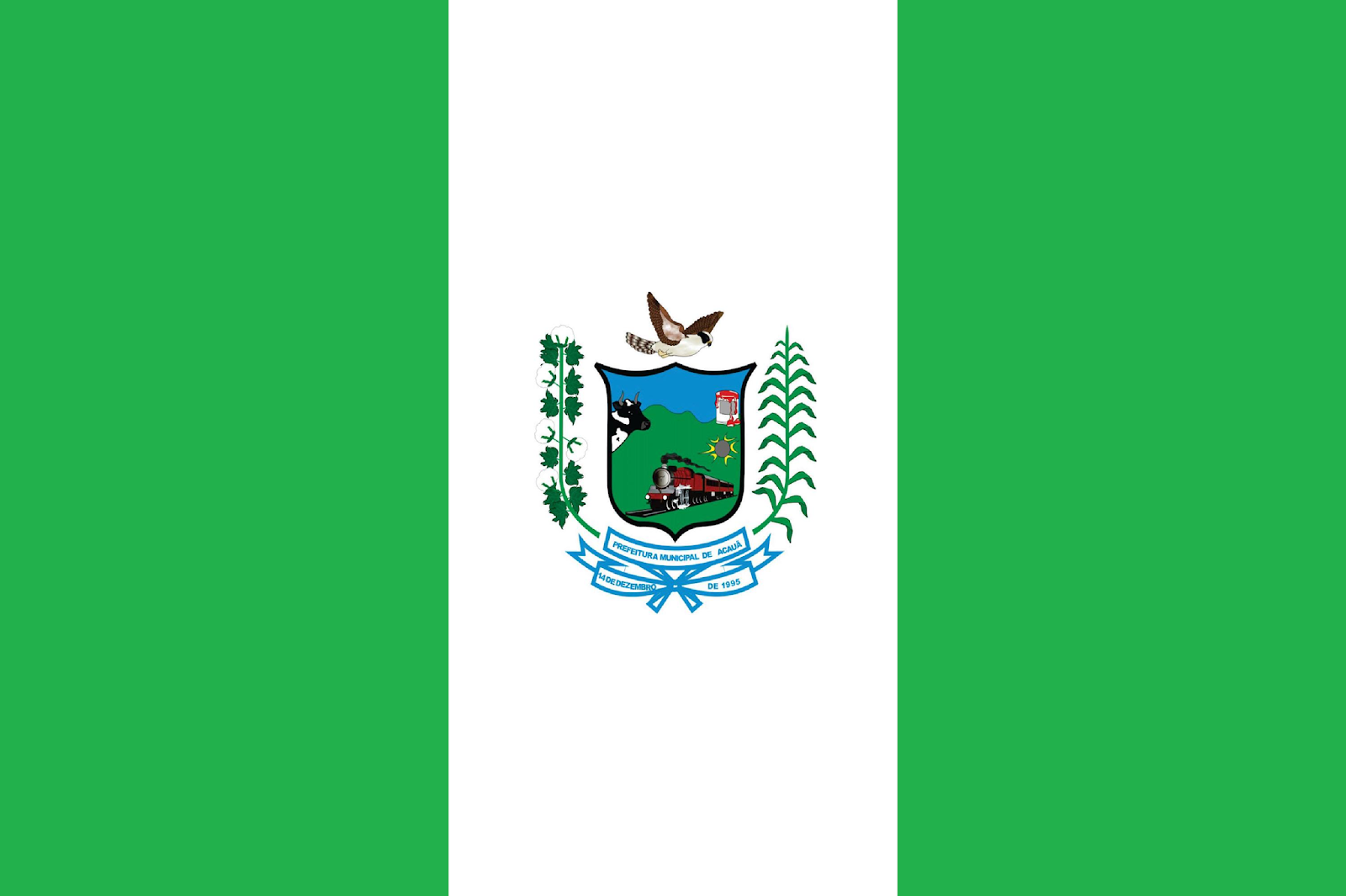
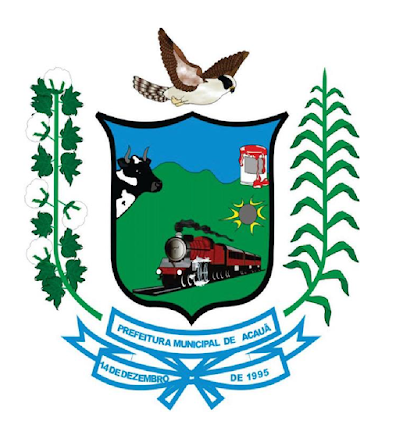
- Flag Coat of arms

- Country: Brazil
- Region: Nordeste
- State: Piauí
- Mesoregion: Sudeste Piauiense

Population (2020)
  - Total: 7,102
- Time zone: UTC−3 (BRT)

Acauã is a municipality in the state of Piauí in the Northeast region of Brazil.

== See also ==
- List of municipalities in Piauí
