= Bela Vista do Piauí =

Coordinates: 7.98889°S 41.8678°W

- Municipality
- Country: Brazil
- Region: Nordeste
- State: Piauí
- Mesoregion: Sudeste Piauiense

Population (2020)
  - Total: 4,030
- Time zone: UTC−3 (BRT)

Bela Vista do Piauí is a municipality in the state of Piauí in the Northeast region of Brazil.

== See also ==
- List of municipalities in Piauí
