= Capitão de Campos =

Coordinates: 4.45694°S 41.9439°W

- Municipality
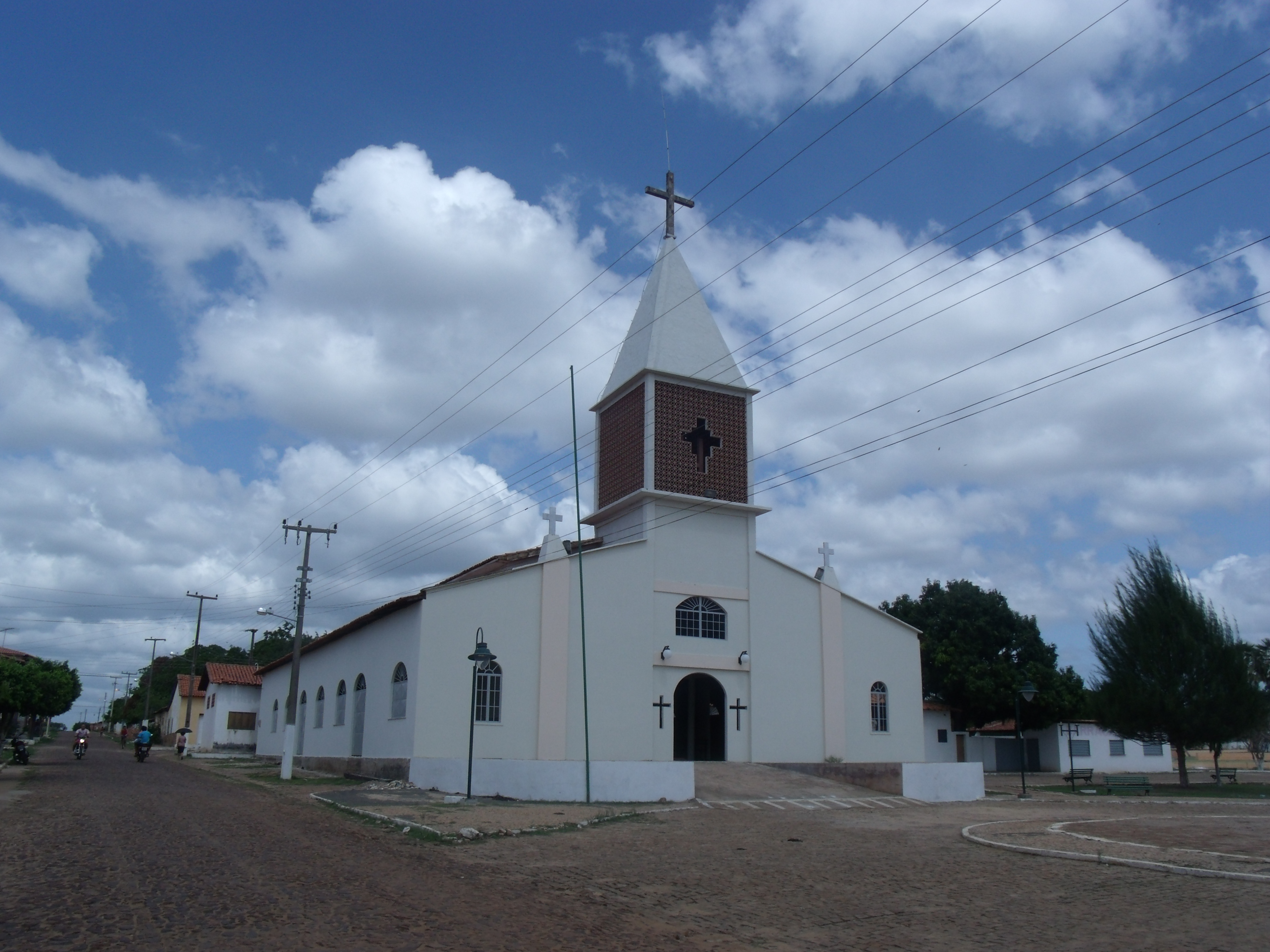

- Country: Brazil
- Region: Northeast
- State: Piauí
- Mesoregion: Centro-Norte Piauiense

Population (2020)
  - Total: 11,445
- Time zone: UTC−3 (BRT)

Capitão de Campos is a municipality in the state of Piauí in the Northeast region of Brazil.

== See also ==
- List of municipalities in Piauí
