= Colônia do Gurguéia =

Coordinates: 8.18194°S 43.7919°W

- Municipality
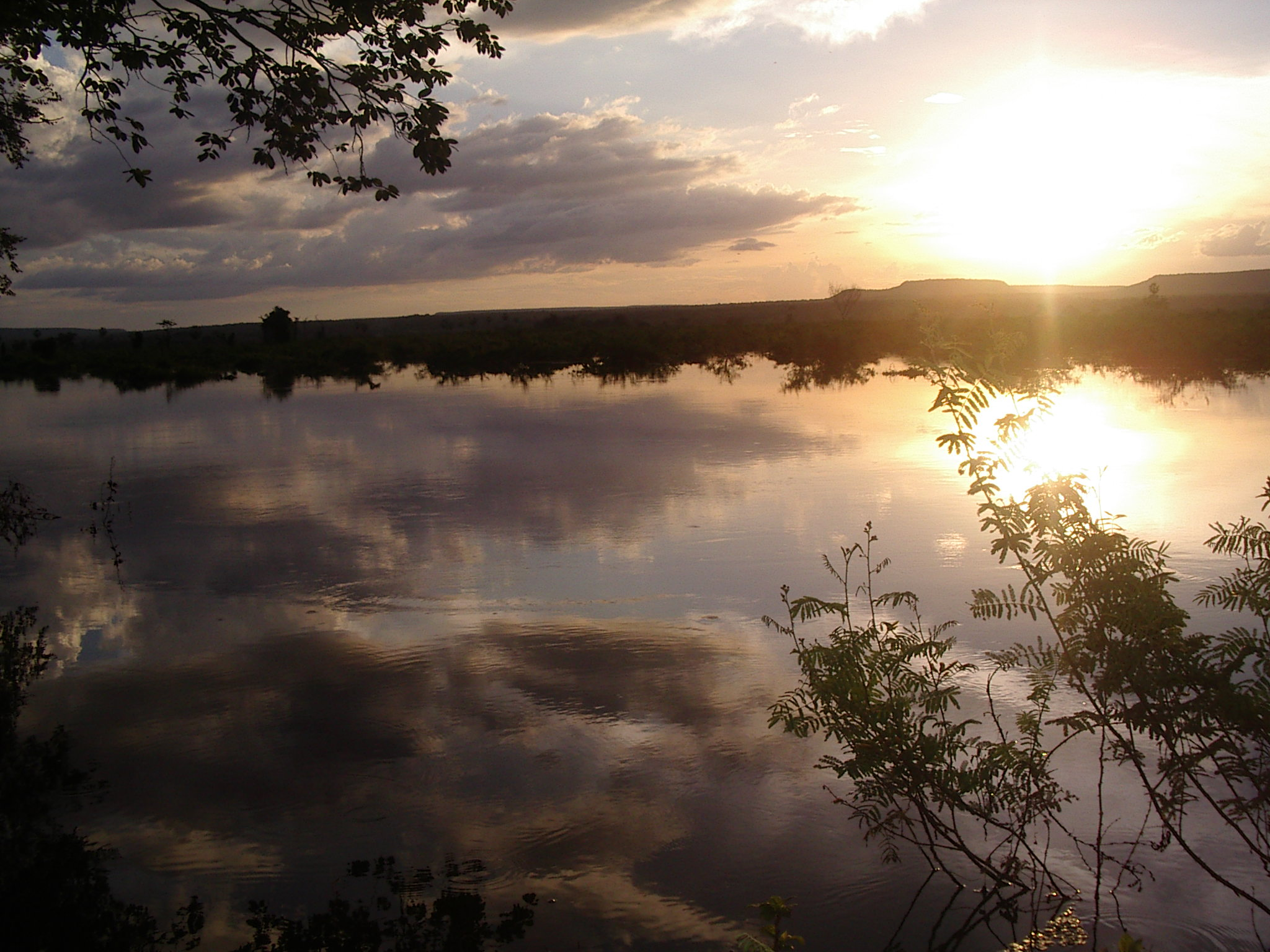

- Country: Brazil
- Region: Nordeste
- State: Piauí
- Mesoregion: Sudoeste Piauiense

Population (2020)
  - Total: 6,516
- Time zone: UTC−3 (BRT)

Colônia do Gurguéia is a municipality in the state of Piauí in the Northeast region of Brazil.

== See also ==
- List of municipalities in Piauí
