= Campo Alegre do Fidalgo =

Coordinates: 8.37583°S 41.8358°W

- Municipality
- Country: Brazil
- Region: Nordeste
- State: Piauí
- Mesoregion: Sudeste Piauiense

Population (2020)
  - Total: 5,069
- Time zone: UTC−3 (BRT)

Campo Alegre do Fidalgo is a municipality in the state of Piauí in the Northeast region of Brazil.

== See also ==
- List of municipalities in Piauí
