= Tanque do Piauí =

Coordinates: 6.6°S 42.2819°W

- Municipality
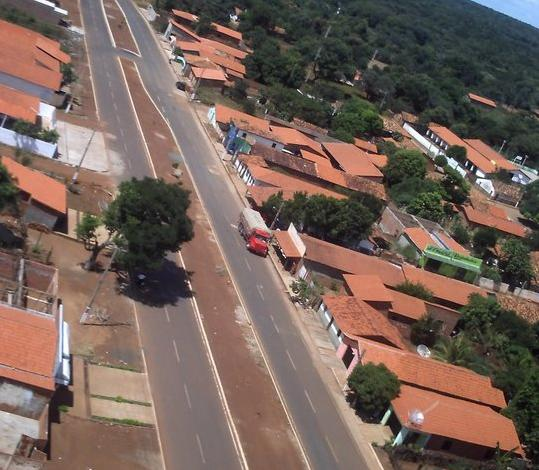

- Country: Brazil
- Region: Nordeste
- State: Piauí
- Mesoregion: Sudeste Piauiense

Population (2020)
  - Total: 2,773
- Time zone: UTC−3 (BRT)

Tanque do Piauí is a municipality in the state of Piauí in the Northeast region of Brazil.

== See also ==
- List of municipalities in Piauí
