= Canavieira =

Coordinates: 7.68778°S 43.7208°W

- Municipality
- Country: Brazil
- Region: Nordeste
- State: Piauí
- Mesoregion: Sudoeste Piauiense

Population (2020)
  - Total: 3,944
- Time zone: UTC−3 (BRT)

Canavieira is a municipality in the state of Piauí in the Northeast region of Brazil.

== See also ==
- List of municipalities in Piauí
