= Cajazeiras do Piauí =

Coordinates: 6.76583°S 42.3919°W

- Municipality
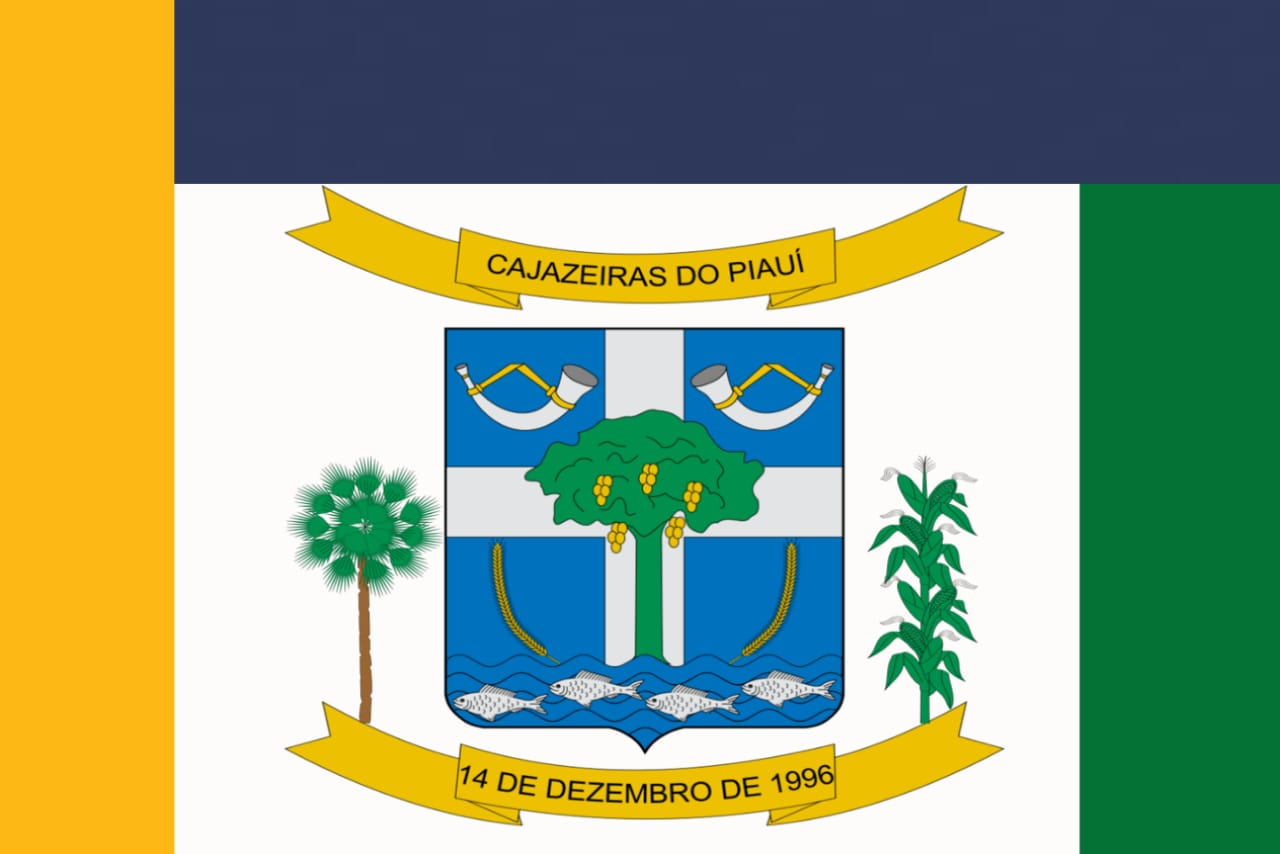
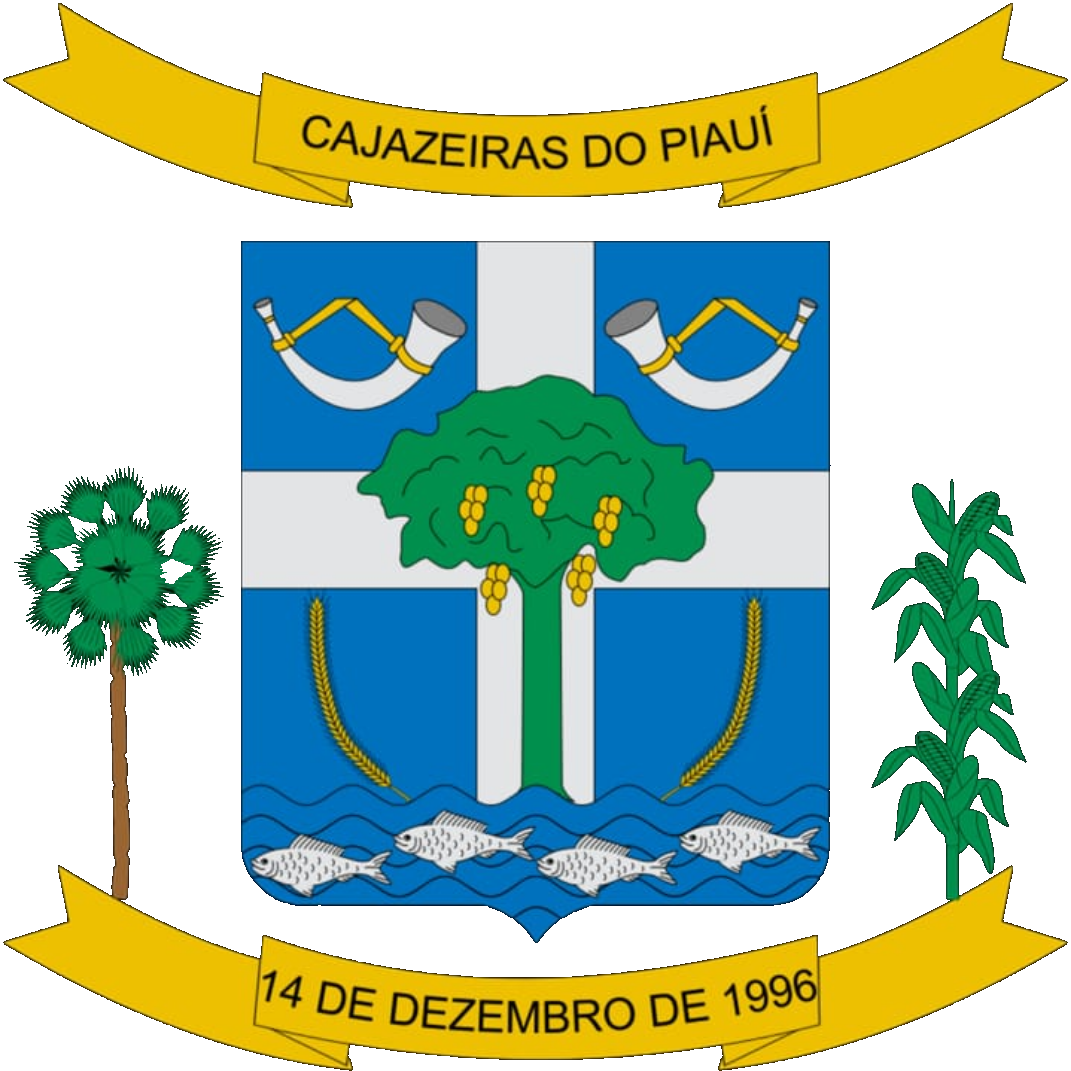
- Flag Coat of arms

- Country: Brazil
- Region: Nordeste
- State: Piauí
- Mesoregion: Sudeste Piauiense

Population (2020)
  - Total: 3,573
- Time zone: UTC−3 (BRT)

Cajazeiras do Piauí is a municipality in the state of Piauí in the Northeast region of Brazil.

== See also ==
- List of municipalities in Piauí
