= Manoel Emídio =

Coordinates: 8.01278°S 43.8719°W

- Municipality
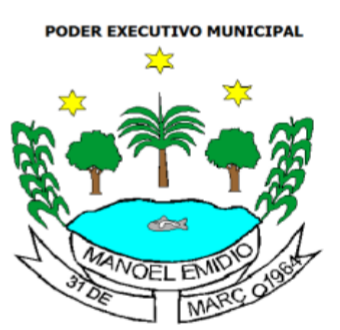
- Coat of arms

- Country: Brazil
- Region: Nordeste
- State: Piauí
- Mesoregion: Sudoeste Piauiense

Population (2020)
  - Total: 5,351
- Time zone: UTC−3 (BRT)

Manoel Emídio is a municipality in the state of Piauí in the Northeast region of Brazil.

== See also ==
- List of municipalities in Piauí
