= Caldeirão Grande do Piauí =

Coordinates: 7.33194°S 40.6369°W

- Municipality
- Country: Brazil
- Region: Nordeste
- State: Piauí
- Mesoregion: Sudeste Piauiense

Population (2020)
  - Total: 5,781
- Time zone: UTC−3 (BRT)

Caldeirão Grande do Piauí is a municipality in the state of Piauí in the Northeast region of Brazil.

== Climate ==
Climate data for Caldeirão Grande do Piauí (1981–2010)
Month	Jan	Feb	Mar	Apr	May	Jun	Jul	Aug	Sep	Oct	Nov	Dec	Year
Mean daily maximum °C (°F)	33.7 (92.7)	32.5 (90.5)	31.7 (89.1)	31.5 (88.7)	32.1 (89.8)	32.8 (91.0)	34.0 (93.2)	35.8 (96.4)	37.2 (99.0)	37.6 (99.7)	37.3 (99.1)	36.0 (96.8)	34.4 (93.9)
Daily mean °C (°F)	27.0 (80.6)	26.3 (79.3)	25.9 (78.6)	26.1 (79.0)	26.3 (79.3)	26.2 (79.2)	26.6 (79.9)	27.7 (81.9)	28.9 (84.0)	29.0 (84.2)	29.2 (84.6)	28.6 (83.5)	27.3 (81.1)
Mean daily minimum °C (°F)	22.1 (71.8)	22.1 (71.8)	22.1 (71.8)	22.2 (72.0)	21.9 (71.4)	20.8 (69.4)	20.3 (68.5)	20.7 (69.3)	21.1 (70.0)	21.4 (70.5)	22.0 (71.6)	22.0 (71.6)	21.6 (70.9)
Average precipitation mm (inches)	199.4 (7.85)	241.8 (9.52)	315.4 (12.42)	307.4 (12.10)	146.4 (5.76)	39.7 (1.56)	16.9 (0.67)	10.2 (0.40)	6.2 (0.24)	23.4 (0.92)	22.5 (0.89)	73.6 (2.90)	1,402.9 (55.23)
Average precipitation days (≥ 1.0 mm)	12	14	19	19	11	4	3	1	1	2	3	6	95
Average relative humidity (%)	78.3	83.8	85.7	85.7	82.9	77.0	72.4	67.3	62.1	60.4	65.2	68.2	74.1
Mean monthly sunshine hours	196.2	178.1	173.6	164.6	214.1	245.8	267.1	291.2	289.6	291.5	262.8	238.1	2,812.7
Source: Instituto Nacional de Meteorologia

== See also ==
- List of municipalities in Piauí
