= Santa Rosa do Piauí =

Coordinates: 6.79889°S 42.2878°W

- Municipality
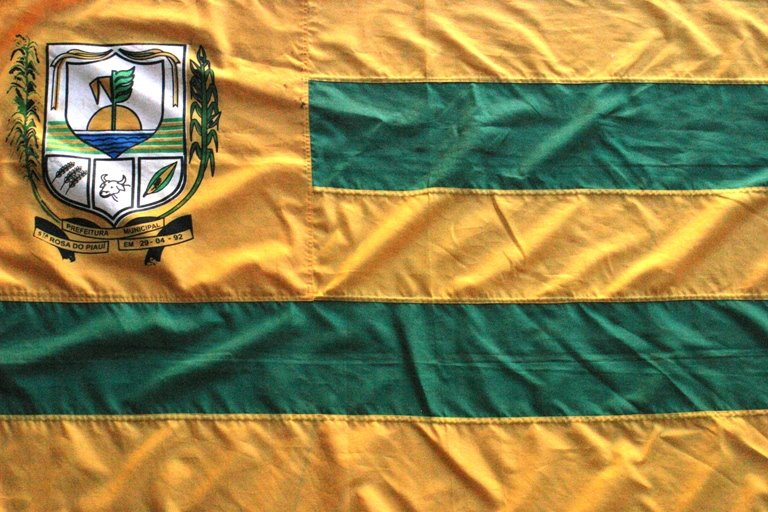
- Flag

- Country: Brazil
- Region: Nordeste
- State: Piauí
- Mesoregion: Sudeste Piauiense

Population (2020)
  - Total: 5,255
- Time zone: UTC−3 (BRT)

Santa Rosa do Piauí is a municipality in the state of Piauí in the Northeast region of Brazil.

== See also ==
- List of municipalities in Piauí
