= São João da Canabrava =

Coordinates: 6.81694°S 41.3428°W

- Municipality
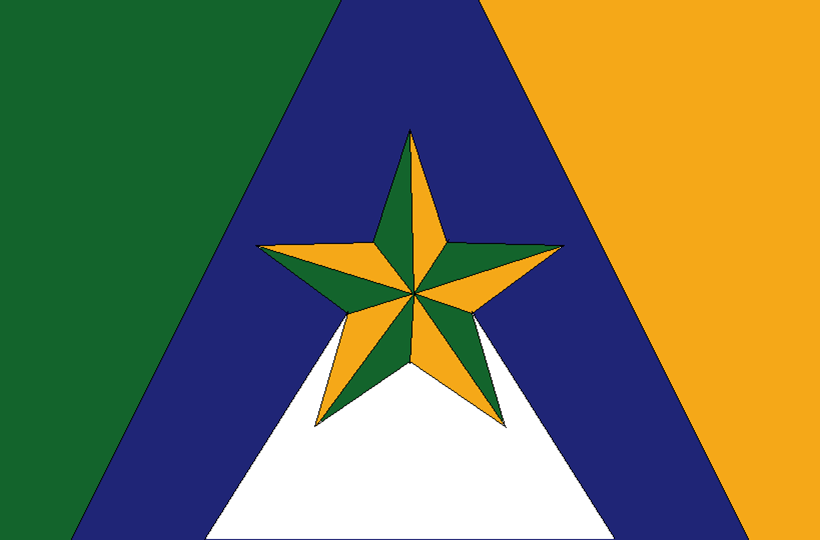
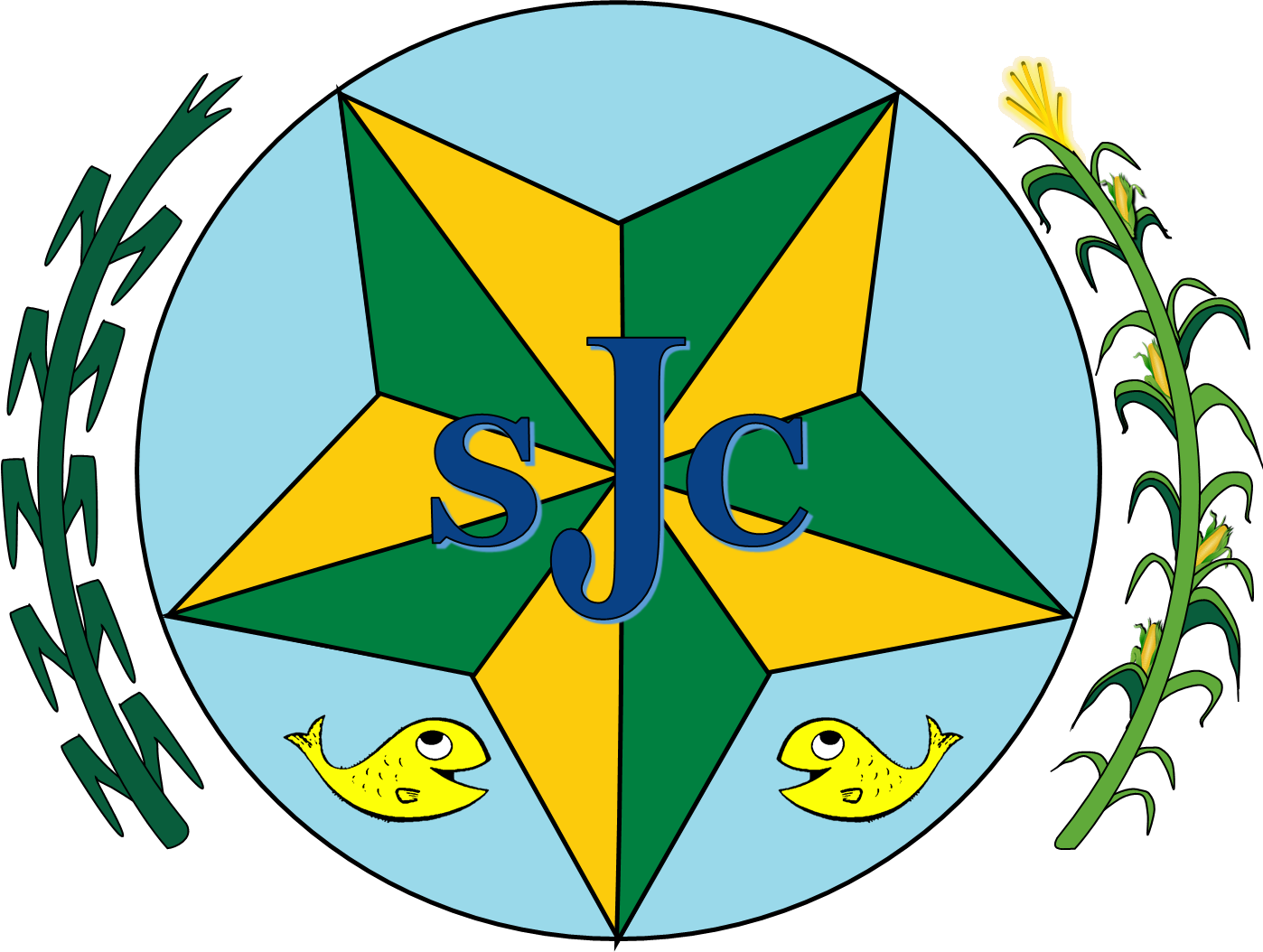
- Flag Coat of arms

- Country: Brazil
- Region: Nordeste
- State: Piauí
- Mesoregion: Sudeste Piauiense

Population (2020)
  - Total: 4,614
- Time zone: UTC−3 (BRT)

São João da Canabrava is a municipality in the state of Piauí in the Northeast region of Brazil.

== See also ==
- List of municipalities in Piauí
