= Aroeiras do Itaim =

- Municipality
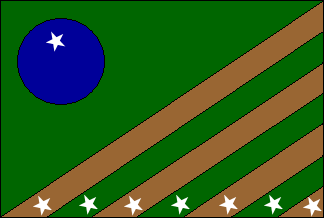
- Flag

- Location in Piauí state

- Location in Brazil
- Coordinates: 6°54′22″S 41°15′45″W
- Country: Brazil
- Region: Northeast
- State: Piauí

Population (2020)
  - Total: 2,551
- Time zone: UTC−3 (BRT)

Aroeiras do Itaim is a municipality in the Brazilian state of Piauí. The municipality was founded on 1 January 2005. There are 2,551 people residing in the city, according to IBGE.
