= Niède Guidon =

Brazilian archaeologist (1933–2025)

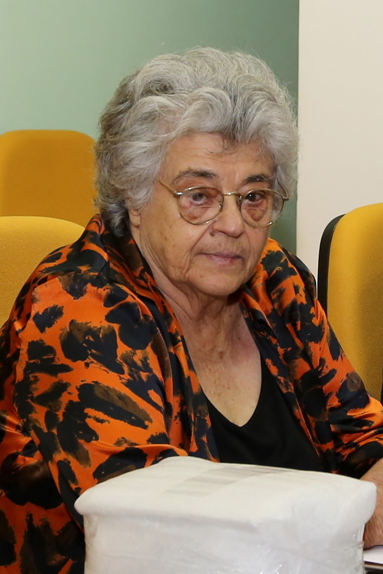
- Guidon in 2013
- Born: 12 March 1933; Jaú, São Paulo, Brazil
- Died: 4 June 2025 (aged 92); São Raimundo Nonato, Piauí, Brazil
- Citizenship: Brazilian, French
- Education: University of São Paulo; University of Paris (Sorbonne)
- Known for: Conserving the natural and cultural heritage of the World Heritage Site Serra da Capivara National Park, Brazil
- Awards: Prince Claus Award
- Scientific career
- Fields: Archaeology
- Workplaces: American Man Museum Foundation; Serra da Capivara National Park in Piauí, Brazil

Niède Guidon (Portuguese pronunciation: [niˈɛdʒi ɡiˈdõ]) (12 March 1933 – 4 June 2025) was a Brazilian archaeologist known for her work in pre-historic archeology of South American civilizations and her efforts to secure the conservation of the World Heritage Site Serra da Capivara National Park.

Educated in Brazil and France, she worked in Paris for most of her career. From the early 1970s, Guidon conducted archeological research in Southeast Piauí, where thousands of archeological sites have been discovered. Her dates from those sites indicate that human settlement preceded North America's Clovis people by tens of thousands of years. In the late 1980s, these findings challenged the mainstream theory of Clovis First and have generated debate in the academic archeology community.

She was the founding president of the Fundação Museu do Homem Americano (American Man Museum Foundation), a non-profit organization created to support the Serra da Capivara National Park, a World Heritage Site. Guidon won several national and international awards, including the Prince Claus Award, and the Ford conservation and Environment award.

== Early life and education ==
Guidon was born in 1933 in Jaú, in São Paulo (state), Brazil. She moved to São Paulo, where she studied Natural History at the University of São Paulo and subsequently worked for the Ipiranga Museum.

In 1963, Guidon organized an exhibition of prehistoric paintings at the Ipiranga Museum. A visitor approached her from Serra da Capivara, who showed her photographs of rock art from rock shelters in the area. Guidon recognized that the paintings were significantly different from any known at that time, and was struck by their diversity and abundance.

== Career ==
In 1964, Guidon was targeted by the Brazilian military dictatorship, which persecuted and tortured alleged communist scholars and students. To escape persecution, she moved to France, where she completed a Ph.D. in prehistory at the Sorbonne University with André Leroi-Gourhan and Annette Laming-Emperaire.

From 1966 to 1977, she was a researcher at the French National Centre for Scientific Research (CNRS) in Paris, and became a professor at the School for Advanced Studies in the Social Sciences in Paris.

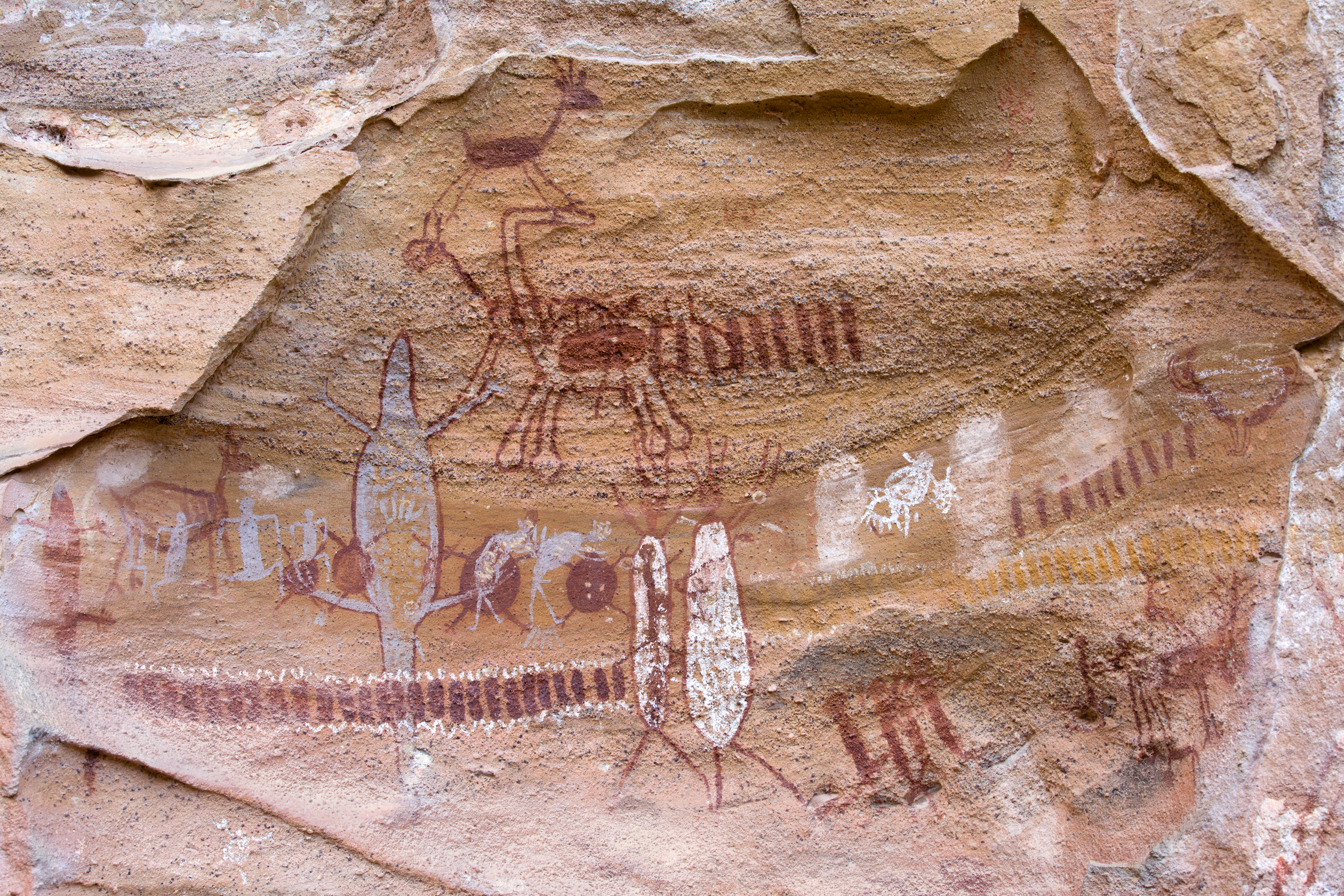
Prehistoric paintings at the Serra da Capivara National Park

Guidon visited the rock shelters at Piauí herself and in 1973 began research in the area. In 1978, she convinced the French government to establish an archeological mission to study prehistory in Piauí. Guidon led a mission composed of national and international researchers and local field assistants until her retirement.

In 1978, Guidon and other researchers petitioned the Brazilian government to create a protected area in the Serra da Capivara region. The Serra da Capivara National Park was created in 1979, encompassing an area protected by UNESCO, but the legislation has received little investment for its implementation.

As the head archaeologist at the national park, Guidon was responsible for the preservation, development and management of archaeological projects in the park. She and her colleagues have discovered more than 800 pre-historic sites revealing occupation of the Americas by human beings, of which more than 600 are accompanied by paintings.

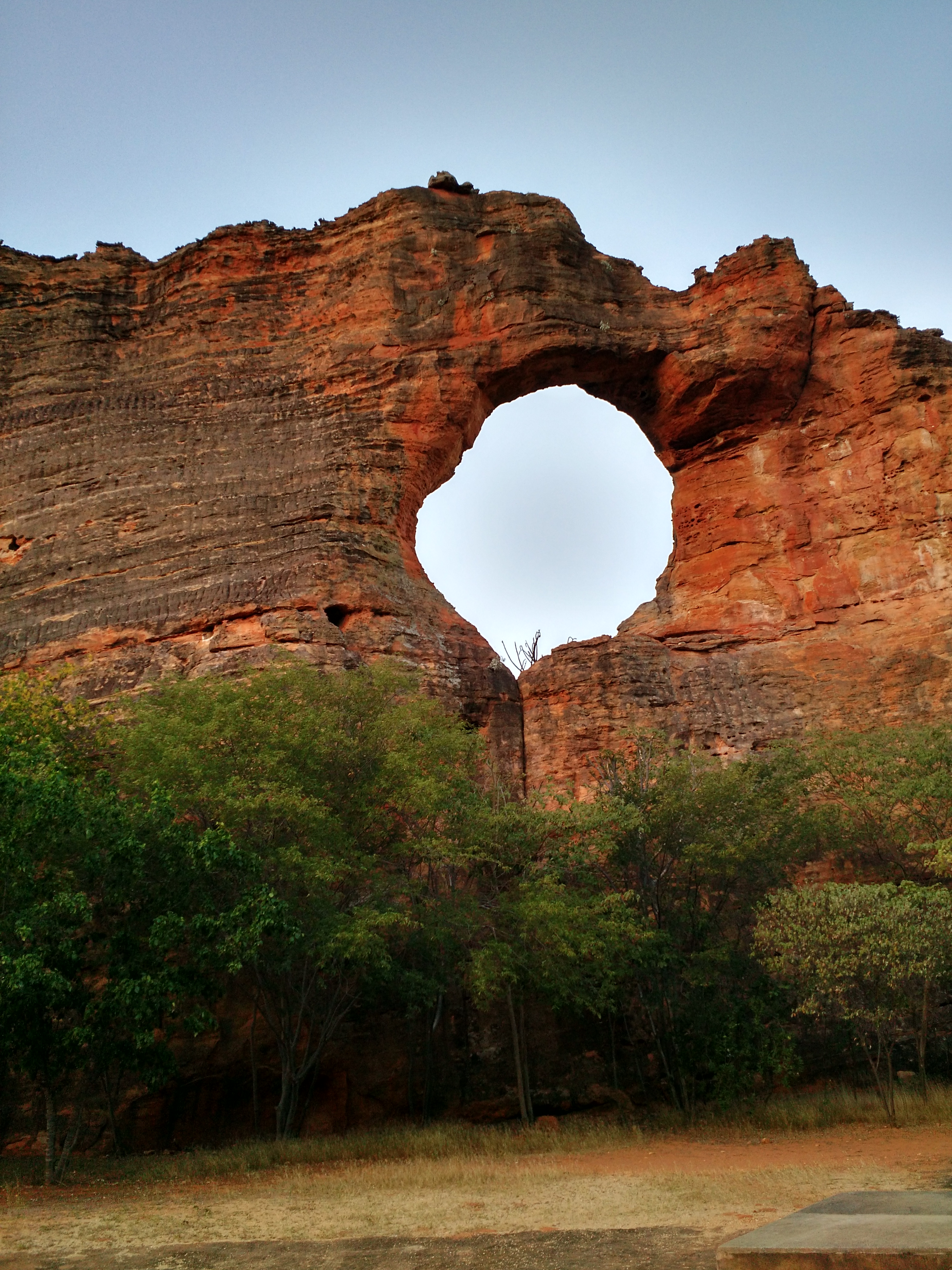
The Pedra Furada, where more than 1,150 pre-historic images are located inside the Serra da Capivara National Park

Guidon's most famous prehistoric site is the Toca do Boqueira de Pedra Furada, located near São Raimundo Nonato in the Serra de Capivara park. Pedra Furada is a rock shelter 55 feet (17 m) deep; its walls are painted with more than 1,150 pre-historic images. Guidon found thousands of artifacts here that could suggest human handiwork, and discovered a structure resembling a bonfire equipped with arranged logs and stones that she believes date back 48,700 years. She suggested that humans reached Brazil about 100,000 years ago, probably by boat from Africa. Michael R. Waters, a geoarchaeologist at Texas A&M University noted the absence of genetic evidence in modern populations to support Guidon's claim.

The plant and animal remains recovered from the c. 10,000-year-old levels of this site and from comparable levels of another rock shelter in the Serra, the Perna site, show that the area was more humid and more forested than today.

In Pedra Furada, Guidon and her colleagues excavated an archaeological rock art site to uncover evidence of a Paleoindian culture they believe to be as old as c. 30,000 years BP, significantly predating previous theories of the first habitation of the area by early Americans. She recorded over 35,000 archaeological images and published multiple papers and books.

Her findings were first brought into the spotlight in 1986 with a publication in the British magazine Nature, in which she claimed to have discovered 32,000-year-old hearths and human artifacts. Although such early dates have not been generally accepted, Guidon and her colleagues have shown that the area was occupied by Paleoindian and Archaic rock art cultures subsisting on broad-spectrum hunting and gathering. In 1988 she began a partnership with the Brazilian Institute of Environment and Renewable Natural Resources (IBAMA), to facilitate the continuation of her excavations. After her retirement, Eric Boëda, a researcher at the CNRS and professor at the Université Paris, took over her project.

=== Community work ===
From its creation in 1986 until 2020 Guidon was the president of the non-profit organization Fundação Museu do Homem Americano (FUMDHAM) (American Man Museum Foundation) which she and others founded in response to the growing threat to the integrity of local ecosystems and rock art, and to manage and protect the National Park and develop its surrounding rural communities.

== Personal life ==
In 1990, Guidon moved from Paris to São Raimundo Nonato, Piauí, the gateway community of the Serra da Capivara National Park, where remained until her death in 2025.

As president of FUMDHAM, she was involved in creating two museums, the Museum of the American Man and Nature's Museum, a research center, and several social projects in education, health care, and sustainable economic activities in rural communities, offering training in ecology, prehistory, and the restoration of archaeological artifacts. Guidon also led petitions to build schools, successfully establishing five new schools in local communities with a teaching faculty from the University of São Paulo, which have since declined in activity due to the lack of governmental structure. She also started a ceramics business, Cerâmica de Capivara, which she turned over to local entrepreneurs when it began making a profit.

=== Death ===
Guidon died at her home in São Raimundo Nonato, on 4 June 2025, at the age of 92. Her death was announced by the director of Serra da Capivara National Park, Marian Rodrigues.

== Awards ==
Guidon won the Prince Claus Award, and the Ford Conservation and Environment award. In 2005, she was one of the 1000 women nominated for the Nobel Peace Prize.

Since September 5, 2025, São Raimundo Nonato Airport is also named after Niède Guidon.

== Reception ==
In 2014, Michael R. Waters, a geoarchaeologist at Texas A&M University, noted the absence of genetic evidence in modern populations to support Guidon's claim.

== See also ==
- Toca da Tira Peia
