= Anísio de Abreu =

Coordinates: 9.18889°S 43.0458°W

- Municipality
- Location in Piauí
- Country: Brazil
- Region: Nordeste
- State: Piauí
- Mesoregion: Sudoeste Piauiense

Population (2020)
  - Total: 9,938
- Time zone: UTC−3 (BRT)

Anísio de Abreu is a municipality in the state of Piauí in the Northeast region of Brazil.

The municipality is in the Capivara-Confusões Ecological Corridor, created in 2006 to link the Serra da Capivara National Park to the Serra das Confusões National Park.

== See also ==
- List of municipalities in Piauí
