= Chiquihuite cave =

Possible Upper Paleolithic archaeological site in Zacatecas, Mexico

Chiquihuite Cave is a possible Upper Paleolithic archaeological site in the Astillero Mountains, Zacatecas State, in North-Central Mexico. Chiquihuite Cave may be evidence of early human presence in the Western Hemisphere up to 33,000 years ago. It is located 2,740 meters (9000 feet) above sea level and about 1 kilometer higher than the valley below. Stones discovered here, thought to be lithic artifacts, have been dated to 26,000 years ago based on more than 50 samples of animal bone and charcoal found in association with these stones. However, there is scholarly debate over whether the stones are truly artifacts, human-made tools that are evidence of human presence, or if they were formed naturally. No evidence of human DNA or hearths have been unearthed.

== Excavation history ==
Excavations were started in 2012, when a test pit unearthed unusual stones believed to be artifacts. Further excavations were carried out in an expanded 3-meter-deep excavation unit in 2016 and 2017 under the leadership of Ciprian Ardelean of the Autonomous University of Zacatecas (Mexico). Ardelean's team recovered 1,930 stone objects from the cave. Evidence of wind-blown sediment indicates that they could have moved horizontally, but not vertically through stratigraphic layers used to date them. The researchers obtained 46 radiocarbon dates from bone, charcoal, and sediment samples. They found six more dates using luminescence dating. The dates indicate that the objects were deposited about 26,000 years ago.

Ardelean's team used pollen analysis and DNA extractions to find if early humans had been present in the cave: no human DNA was found.

== Evidence of early humans ==
Many of the stones found in Chiquihuite Cave are believed to be artifacts, specifically human-made tools. Almost 30 percent of them show signs of usage around the edges. They are black and green limestone. The use of limestone may indicate human selectivity because of its availability near the cave but not within it. The shape of many of the artifacts also suggest that they were flaked using human tools such as wooden or bone hammers. Ardelean considers some of the artifacts to be transversal points, suggesting that they were made using microlithic technology. This technology differentiates the artifacts from similar ones found at nearby sites.

Researchers also considered environmental data. They found palm phytoliths in all samples from inside the cave. It is unlikely that the palm phytoliths were naturally present in the cave based on the high altitude. It is more likely that they are remnants of plants brought into the cave by early humans.

DNA from a wide range of animals was found in the cave, including black bears, rodents, bats, voles, and even kangaroo rats. DNA sequencing indicates that an ancestor of the American black bear was present in the cave 16,000 years ago and a now-extinct giant short-faced bear was in the cave 13,000 years ago. No human DNA was found. The chances of finding human DNA in the cave were low, so human presence should not be ruled out because of this factor.

The site is lacking in cultural evidence of humans, making archaeologists conclude that the site was visited only occasionally by bands of hunter-gatherers; perhaps it was used as a refuge during particularly severe weather. Evidence indicates that the cave was in use for approximately 16,000 years. If so, Chiquihuite Cave serves as significant evidence that humans were adapted to living in high altitude mountainous areas much earlier than previously thought.

== Regional context ==
According to the scientists involved in this research, recent investigations have uncovered good evidence of a human presence during the Late Pleistocene and Early Holocene epochs in other parts of Mexico, too. They refer to “the northwest region of Mexico, the Chiapas Highlands, Central Mexico, and the Caribbean coast”. This new research pushes back “dates for human dispersal to the region possibly as early as 33,000–31,000 years ago”.

Other sites in the Western Hemisphere including Bluefish Caves in Canada and the Santa Elina shelter in Brazil (es:Abrigo de Santa Elina) have yielded similar dates to Chiquihuite. Transversal points similar to those found in Chiquihuite Cave are common at Pleistocene sites in South America including the Toca da Tira Peia, Toca da Pena (Serra da Capivara National Park), and Toca da Janela da Barra do Antonião-Norte sites in Brazil.

== Controversy ==
Scholars disagree over the significance of the excavations at Chiquihuite Cave. In 2021, a team of researchers headed by James Chatters of Central Washington University concluded that if the dating of the Chiquihuite site were accurate, the population present would have had to have been completely invisible to genetic studies and contributed no genes to ancestral Native Americans. Additionally, the potential artifacts were called into question, with the researchers suggesting that they are likely geofacts created as the result of natural processes. He found that the slope of limestone pointing towards the mouth of the cave could have caused a natural deposit of stone, which would be naturally flaked during the fall, to appear like artifacts. Furthermore, Ardelean's data indicates that limestone could have been produced from the cave wall. Chatters also believes that blade cores and tertiary flakes would be found near the site if the tools were created by human flaking. Kurt Rademaker, another member of the team, found the images of the proposed tools to lack chipping around the edge which is usually common on stone tools.

Chatters raised a number of concerns about the work done by Ardelean at Chiquihuite Cave. He claims that there was not enough detail provided on how the lithic analysis was conducted. He also recommends that Ardelean should have excavated at the mouth of the cave where humans were more likely to have been rather than deep inside the cave. Finally, Chatters found that the human behaviors at Chiquihuite Cave, namely the diet shown through faunal analysis and patterns of usage of such an inaccessible area, are incompatible with existing scientific understanding of early humans.

Ardelean has responded to this critique with an article defending his argument. He further analyzed ten of the stone tools with special attention to evidence of flake technology and use-wear. He remains confident that 239 tools from the lowest layer were locked beneath a layer of mud and were therefore dated properly. He claims the tools may indicate a beginner was learning how to flake from an expert, based on marks on the artifacts.

== See also ==
- Peopling of the Americas
- Meadowcroft Rockshelter – Archaeological site near Avella, Pennsylvania, US

== Bibliography ==
- The Chiquihuite Cave in Zacatecas, Mexico: Cultural Components, Lithic Industry and the Role of This Pleistocene Site in the Peopling of America. Ciprian Ardelean. Presented at The 82nd Annual Meeting of the Society for American Archaeology, Washington, DC. 2018 (tDAR id: 443571)
- Becerra-Valdivia, Lorena; Higham, Thomas (2020). "The timing and effect of the earliest human arrivals in North America". Nature. 584 (7819): 93–97. Bibcode:2020Natur.584...93B. doi:10.1038/s41586-020-2491-6. ISSN 0028-0836. PMID 32699413. S2CID 220715918.
- Barras, Colin (2020). "Controversial cave discoveries suggest humans reached Americas much earlier than thought". Nature. 583 (7818): 670–671. Bibcode:2020Natur.583..670B. doi:10.1038/d41586-020-02190-y. ISSN 0028-0836. PMID 32699369.
- Gruhn, Ruth (2020). "Evidence grows that peopling of the Americas began more than 20,000 years ago". Nature. 584 (7819): 47–48. Bibcode:2020Natur.584...47G. doi:10.1038/d41586-020-02137-3. ISSN 0028-0836. PMID 32699366.
- Ardelean, Ciprian F.; Becerra-Valdivia, Lorena; Pedersen, Mikkel Winther; Schwenninger, Jean-Luc; Oviatt, Charles G.; Macías-Quintero, Juan I.; Arroyo-Cabrales, Joaquin; Sikora, Martin; Ocampo-Díaz, Yam Zul E.; Rubio-Cisneros, Igor I.; Watling, Jennifer G.; de Medeiros, Vanda B.; De Oliveira, Paulo E.; Barba-Pingarón, Luis; Ortiz-Butrón, Agustín; Blancas-Vázquez, Jorge; Rivera-González, Irán; Solís-Rosales, Corina; Rodríguez-Ceja, María; Gandy, Devlin A.; Navarro-Gutierrez, Zamara; De La Rosa-Díaz, Jesús J.; Huerta-Arellano, Vladimir; Marroquín-Fernández, Marco B.; Martínez-Riojas, L. Martin; López-Jiménez, Alejandro; Higham, Thomas; Willerslev, Eske (2020). "Evidence of human occupation in Mexico around the Last Glacial Maximum". Nature. 584 (7819): 87–92. Bibcode:2020Natur.584...87A. doi:10.1038/s41586-020-2509-0. ISSN 0028-0836. PMID 32699412. S2CID 256819465.
