= São Braz do Piauí =

Coordinates: 8.96194°S 43.0039°W

- Municipality
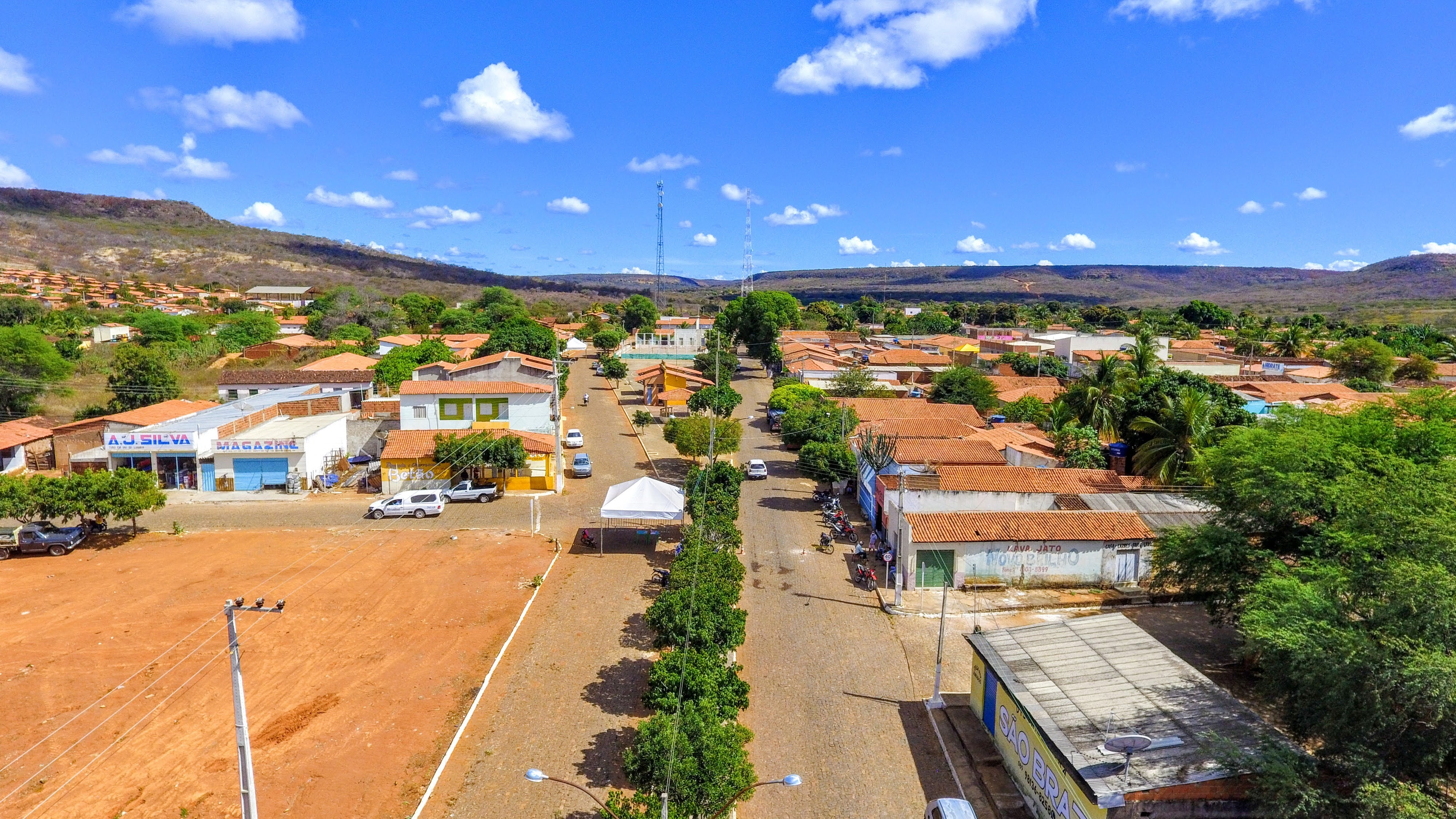

- Location in Piauí
- Country: Brazil
- Region: Nordeste
- State: Piauí
- Mesoregion: Sudoeste Piauiense

Population (2020)
  - Total: 4,451
- Time zone: UTC−3 (BRT)

São Braz do Piauí is a municipality in the state of Piauí in the Northeast region of Brazil.

The municipality is in the Capivara-Confusões Ecological Corridor, created in 2006 to link the Serra da Capivara National Park to the Serra das Confusões National Park.

== See also ==
- List of municipalities in Piauí
