= São Raimundo Nonato Airport =

Serra da Capivara–Niède Guidon Regional Airport Aeroporto Regional da Serra da Capivara–Niède Guidon

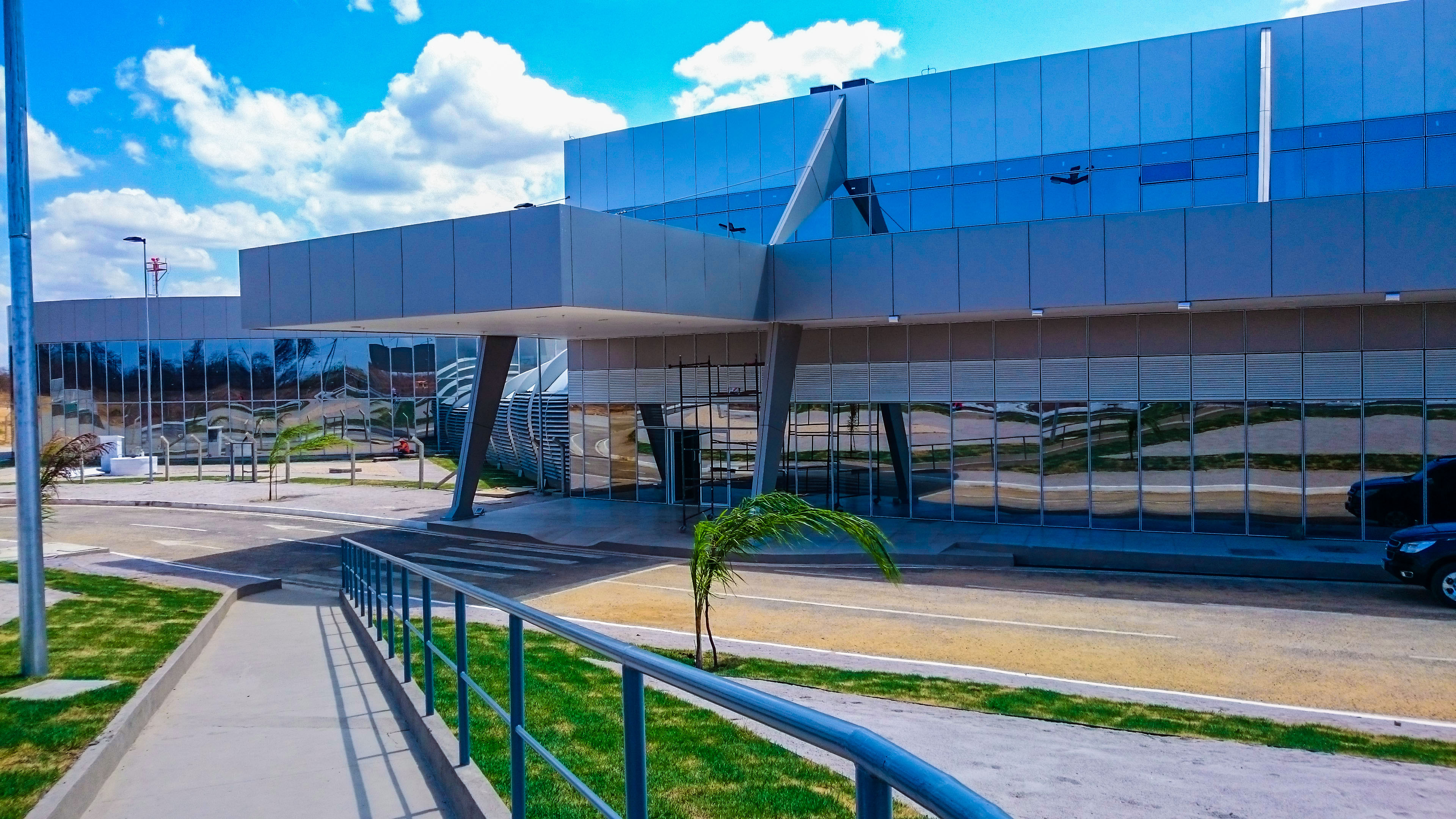
- IATA: NSR; ICAO: SWKQ; LID: PI0004

Summary
- Airport type: Public
- Operator: Esaero (?–2025); GRU Airport (2025–Present)
- Serves: São Raimundo Nonato
- Opened: October 27, 2015
- Time zone: BRT (UTC−03:00)
- Elevation AMSL: 415 m (1,362 ft)
- Coordinates: 09°05′00″S 042°38′41″W

Map
- Location in Brazil

Runways
Direction	Length		Surface
Direction	m	ft	Surface
16/34	1,650	5,413	Asphalt
- Sources: ANAC, DECEA

Serra da Capivara–Niède Guidon Regional Airport (IATA: NSR, ICAO: SWKQ) is the airport serving São Raimundo Nonato, Brazil. It is named after Serra da Capivara National Park and since September 5, 2025 also after the archeologist Niède Guidon.

It is managed by GRU Airport.

== History ==
The airport was commissioned on 27 October 2015.

Since September 5, 2025, the airport is also named after Niède Guidon an archeologist that did extensive work at Serra da Capivara National Park (Piauí State Law 162/2025).

Previously operated by Esaero, on November 27, 2025, GRU Airport won the concession to operate the airport.

== Access ==
The airport is located 10 km (6 mi) from downtown São Raimundo Nonato.

== See also ==
- List of airports in Brazil
