= Cristian Castro (disambiguation) =

Cristian Castro is a Mexican singer.

Cristian Castro may also refer to:

- Cristian Castro Devenish (born 2001), Colombian footballer

== See also ==
- Christian Castro Bello (born 1984), Mexican politician
- Cristina Castro Salvador (born 1969), Spanish athlete
- Cristina Castro, American senator
- Cristino Castro, Brazilian municipality
