= Guaribas =

Coordinates: 9.39778°S 43.6869°W

- Municipality
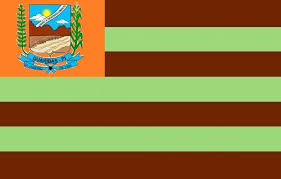
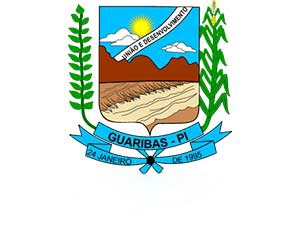
- Flag Coat of arms

- Location in Piauí
- Country: Brazil
- Region: Nordeste
- State: Piauí
- Mesoregion: Sudoeste Piauiense

Government
  - Mayor: Joércio Matias de Andrade (MDB)

Population (2020)
  - Total: 4,568
- Time zone: UTC−3 (BRT)

Guaribas is a municipality in the state of Piauí in the Northeast region of Brazil. Described as a "farming outpost five hours from the nearest paved, two-lane highway", Guaribas is considered one of the poorest municipalities in the country.

== Geography ==
The municipality contains part of the 823,843 hectares (2,035,760 acres) Serra das Confusões National Park, created in 1998, which protects an area of the Caatinga biome. The municipality is in the Capivara-Confusões Ecological Corridor, created in 2006 to link the Serra da Capivara National Park to the Serra das Confusões National Park.

== Demographics ==
Living standards in Gauribas have been compared to that of low-income African countries by O Estado de S. Paulo. In 2003, the city was the testing ground for the Bolsa Família social program.

== Politics ==
In the 2022 Brazilian general election, Guaribas gave Workers' Party candidate Luiz Inácio Lula da Silva his highest share of the vote in the country, with Lula receiving 93% of the vote in the municipality.

The current mayor of Guaribas is Joércio Matias de Andrade, a member of the Brazilian Democratic Movement (MDB).

== See also ==
- List of municipalities in Piauí
