= Tamboril =

Tamboril may refer to:

- Lophius piscatorius, a fish.
- Tamboril, Dominican Republic
- Tamboril, Ceará in Brazil
- Tamboril do Piauí in Brazil
- Tamboril (percussion), a snare drum that hangs from the player's belt and is played with two sticks.
