= Cácio Souza =

Brazilian-born East Timorese footballer

Personal information
- Full name: Cácio de Souza Costa
- Date of birth: 11 February 1995 (age 31)
- Place of birth: Caracol, Piauí, Brazil
- Height: 1.82 m (5 ft 11 1/2 in)
- Position: Defender

Youth career
- 2010–2011: Atlético Mineiro

Senior career*
Years	Team	Apps	(Gls)
2013	Democrata-GV		
2014	Brasiliense		
2015	Samambaia		
2016	Rio Branco-AC		

International career^{‡}
2014	Timor-Leste	4	(0)
- * Club domestic league appearances and goals ‡ National team caps and goals as of 18 May 2025

Cácio de Souza Costa (born 11 February 1995), also known as Cácio Souza, is a Brazilian born East Timorese former football player.

== Club career ==
Discovered by the youth sectors of Atlético Mineiro, he had professional spells at EC Democrata, Brasiliense, Samambaia and Rio Branco-AC.

== International career ==
Cácio made his senior international debut against Brunei national football team in the 2014 AFF Championship qualification on 12 October 2014.
