= Capivara-Confusões Ecological Corridor =

Ecological corridor in Piauí, Brazil

- Corredor Ecológico Capivara-Confusões
- Location within Brazil
- Coordinates: 8.617°S 42.925°W
- Area: 412,000 hectares (1,020,000 acres)
- Designation: Ecological corridor
- Created: 11 March 2005
- Administrator: Brazilian Institute of Environment and Renewable Natural Resources (IBAMA)

The Capivara-Confusões Ecological Corridor (Portuguese: Corredor Ecológico Capivara-Confusões) is an ecological corridor in the caatinga biome of the state of Piauí in northeast Brazil.

== Location ==
The Capivara-Confusões Ecological Corridor links the 100,000 hectares (250,000 acres) Serra da Capivara National Park to the 500,000 hectares (1,200,000 acres) Serra das Confusões National Park 50 kilometres (31 mi) to the west, both in the state of Piauí. It has an area of 412,000 hectares (1,020,000 acres). It includes the municipalities of São Raimundo Nonato, Canto do Buriti, Tamboril do Piauí, Brejo do Piauí, São Braz do Piauí, Anísio de Abreu, Jurema, Caracol and Guaribas.

The corridor is managed by the Brazilian Institute of Environment and Renewable Natural Resources (IBAMA) in partnership with representatives of federal, state and municipal governments, Museum of American Man Foundation (Fumdham), Federation of Agricultural Workers of Bahia (FETAG), Federal University of Piauí, non-governmental organizations, agrarian reform settlers and others. The National Institute for Colonization and Agrarian Reform (INCRA) has said they will maintain a legal reserve of 30% of each settlement in the corridor, and will allocate most settlements for preservation according to the sustainable management plan.

== History ==
Marina Silva, Minister of the Environment, signed the decree creating the corridor on 11 March 2005. The purpose is to restore and preserve the natural environment, facilitating the spread of plants and animals, while encouraging socio-economic development. An initial investment of R$300,000 included funding from the United Nations Environment Fund and the Ministry of the Environment's National Forest Program. This was to be applied to environmental studies and technical assistance to the settlements in the corridor, and to development of a sustainable management plan that encourages activities other than logging so as to avoid deforestation. It was the first officially recognized ecological corridor, the second being the Caatinga Ecological Corridor, created in April 2006.

In 2012 inspectors from the Chico Mendes Institute for Biodiversity Conservation (ICMBio), an analyst from the Ipanema National Forest in São Paulo and military police officers conducted Operation Transitum in the corridor. They seized illegally hunted animals, weapons and traps. They also found evidence of illegal lumber operations and farming.

== Sources ==
- Mattos, Marluza (2006), Ministério cria Corredor Ecológico da Caatinga (in Portuguese), Ministério do Meio Ambiente
- Operação combate caça em corredor ecológico no Piauí (in Portuguese), ICMBio, 25 July 2012, archived from the original on 2016-11-05
- Serras da Capivara e das Confusões serão unidas por corredor ecológico (in Portuguese), MMA, 11 March 2005, archived from the original on 5 November 2016
