= Tamboril do Piauí =

Coordinates: 8.4°S 42.9139°W

- Municipality
- Location in Piauí
- Country: Brazil
- Region: Nordeste
- State: Piauí
- Mesoregion: Sudoeste Piauiense

Population (2020)
  - Total: 2,929
- Time zone: UTC−3 (BRT)

Tamboril do Piauí is a municipality in the state of Piauí in the Northeast region of Brazil.

The municipality contains part of the 823,843 hectares (2,035,760 acres) Serra das Confusões National Park, created in 1998, which protects an area of the Caatinga biome. The municipality is in the Capivara-Confusões Ecological Corridor, created in 2006 to link the Serra da Capivara National Park to the Serra das Confusões National Park.

== See also ==
- List of municipalities in Piauí
