= Pedra Furada =

Collection of archaeological sites in Brazil

Coordinates: 8°50′00″S 42°33′12″W

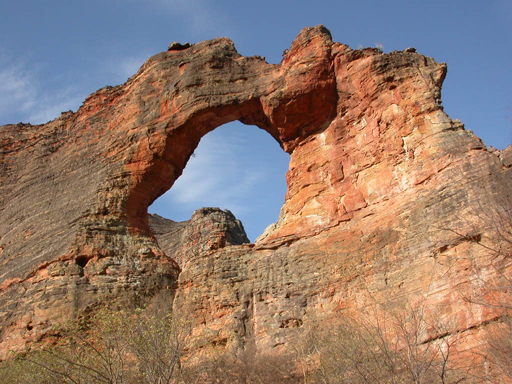
- Stone arch at Pedra Furada.
- Interactive map of Pedra Furada

Pedra Furada (Portuguese pronunciation: [ˈpɛdɾɐ fuˈɾadɐ], meaning pierced rock) is an important collection of over 800 archaeological sites in the state of Piauí, Brazil. These include hundreds of rock paintings dating from circa 12,000 years before present. More importantly, charcoal from very ancient fires and stone shards that may be interpreted as tools found at the location were dated from 48,000 to 32,000 years before present, suggesting the possibility of a human presence tens of thousand of years prior to the arrival of the Clovis people in North America (the latter dates are still under discussion, see Meltzer, 2021: 90–130).

In 1973, a Brazilian and French team excavating a site located in the southeastern portion of what is now the Serra da Capivara National Park discovered the first finds. Brazilian archaeologist Niède Guidon reported the discovery in 1986. In 1991, Pedra Furada became a World Heritage Site.

As of 2000, Guidon's findings were still considered controversial and not widely accepted by experts in the field.

== Excavations ==
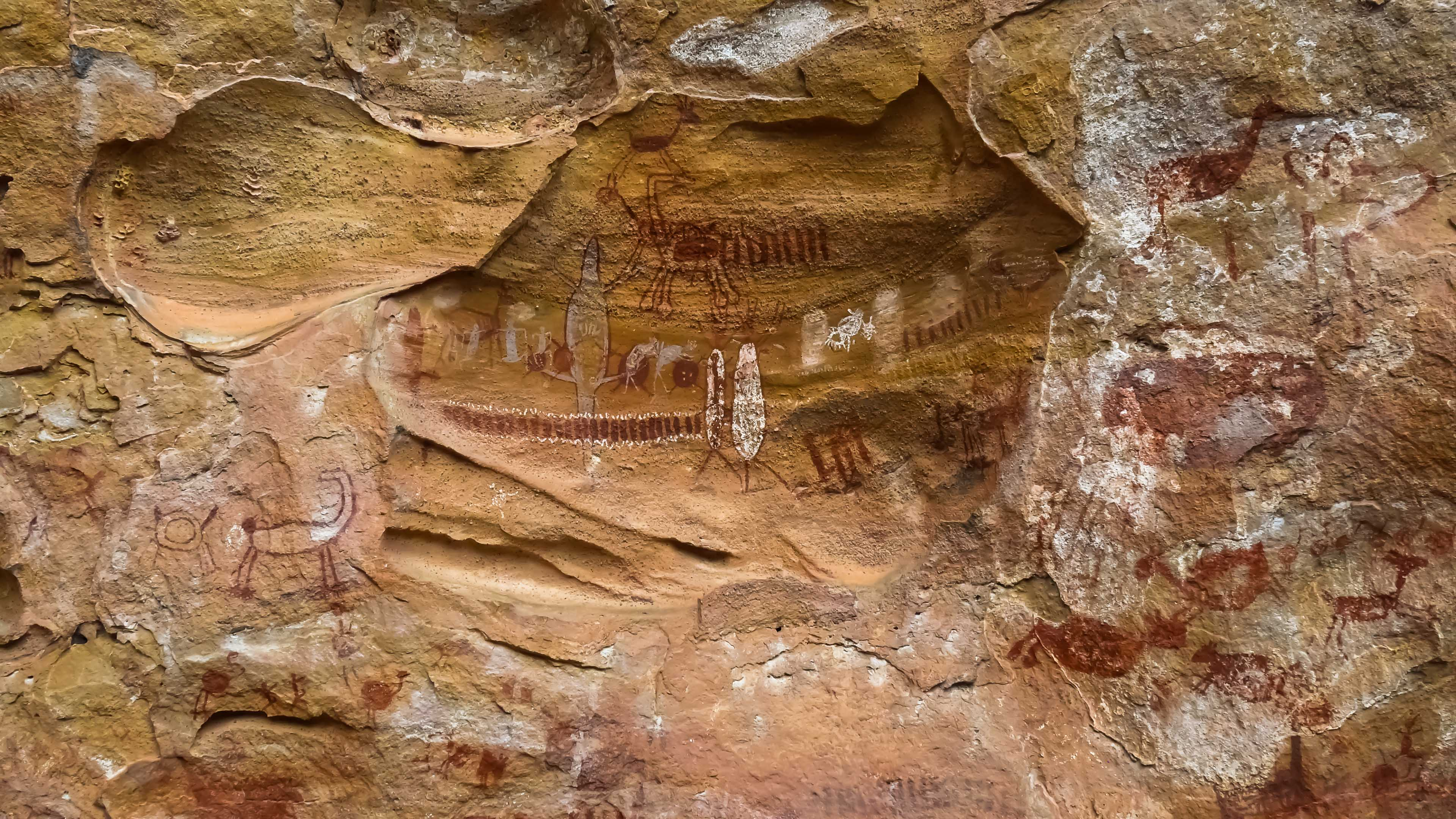
Rock paintings at Pedra Furada

Pedra Furada includes a collection of rock shelters used for thousands of years by human populations. The first excavations yielded charcoal deposits with Carbon-14 dates of 48,000 to 32,000 years BP. Repeated analysis has confirmed this dating, carrying the range of dates up to 60,000 BP. Archaeologist Tom Dillehay suggested in 1994 that the charcoal remains may have been from natural fires and were not necessarily indicative of human occupation.

Guidon established 15 distinct levels, classified in three cultural phases, called Pedra Furada, that includes the oldest remains; and Serra Talhada, from 12,000 to 7,000 BP, with tools such as knives, scrapers, flakes used "as is" or with some retouch and lithic cores, all made of quartz or quartzite. Third is Agreste late phase. The site also has hundreds of rock paintings dated from 5,000 to 11,000 years ago.

In 2013, the site of Toca da Tira Peia, also in Serra da Capivara National Park, was shown to have signs of human presence dating to 22,000 years ago.

As of 2014 the nearby site of Sitio do Meio has been excavated over the years. Although not as old, it helps to support and clarify the chronology of Pedra Furada. The lithics at Sitio do Meio are better preserved.

== Significance ==
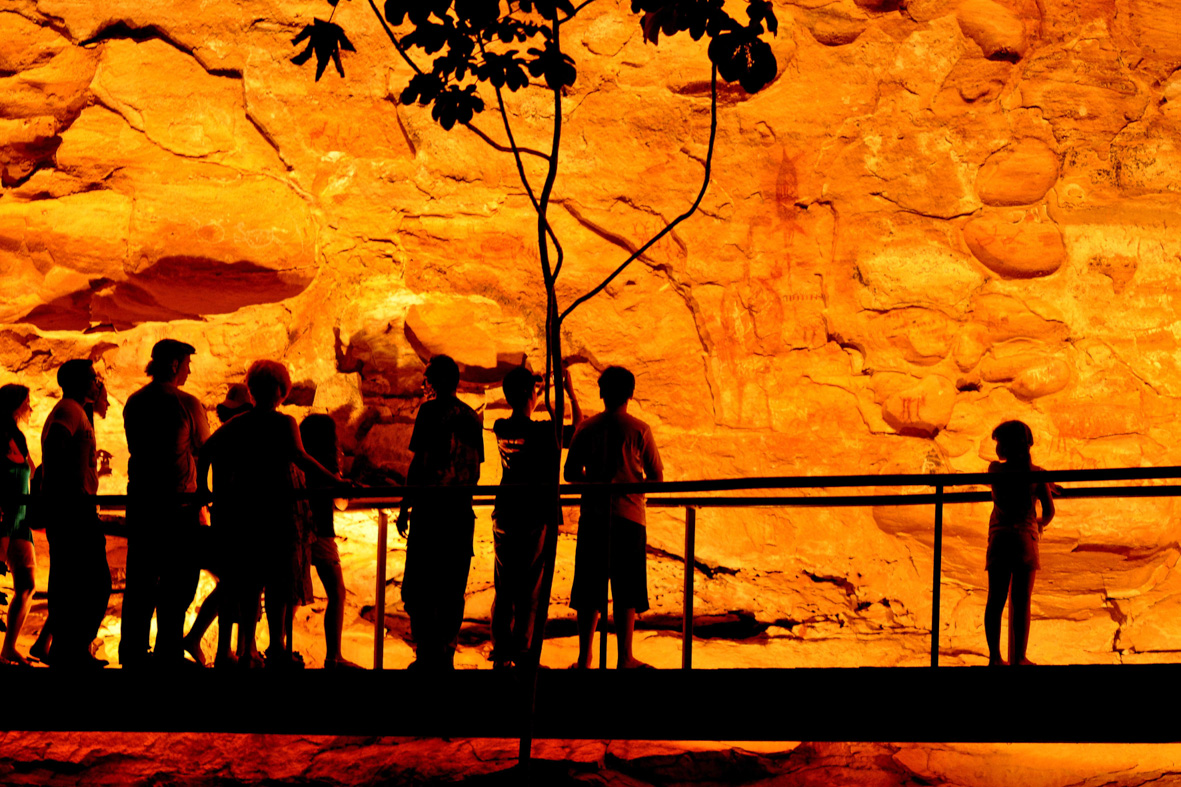
Visitors at the site

The discoveries are the subject of debate as they apparently contradict the longstanding "Clovis first" view ( from the 1930s) for the settlement of humans in the Americas, which holds that the first inhabitants of the continent were representatives of the Clovis culture, which began roughly 11,500 BP. Discoveries at other sites, such as Monte Verde, Chile, dated to 14,800 years BP, Piedra Museo in the Argentinian province of Santa Cruz, dated 11,000 years BP, Topper in the state of South Carolina, US, dated 16,000–20,000 years BP, the Meadowcroft Rockshelter located near Avella in Washington County in southwestern Pennsylvania, United States, dated to 16,000 years BP, and a 2021 discovery of human footprints in relict lake sediments near White Sands National Park in New Mexico demonstrated there was a verifiable human presence in the region dating back to the LGM up to >23,000-17,000 years old, have also raised doubts about the "Clovis First" theory. As a result, scholars have proposed alternate scenarios for the routes of colonization and the diffusion of culture through the continents, in a heated dispute that has not been resolved.

The mainstream view of the peopling of the Americas, also known as the short chronology theory, is that the first movement beyond Alaska into the New World occurred no earlier than 15,000 – 17,000 years ago, followed by successive waves of immigrants. Pedra Furada provides potential evidence for the proponents of the long chronology theory, which states that the first group of people entered the hemisphere at a much earlier date, possibly 21,000–40,000 years ago, with a much later mass secondary wave of immigrants. This evidence at Pedra Furada is considered controversial and not widely accepted by experts in the field. A caribou bone used as a scraper, found at the Old Crow Flats site in Canada and thought to be 27,000 years old, in the 1970s was used to support the long chronology theory. A re-dating, with more modern techniques in the 1990s came up with an age of 2,000 years.

== Controversy ==
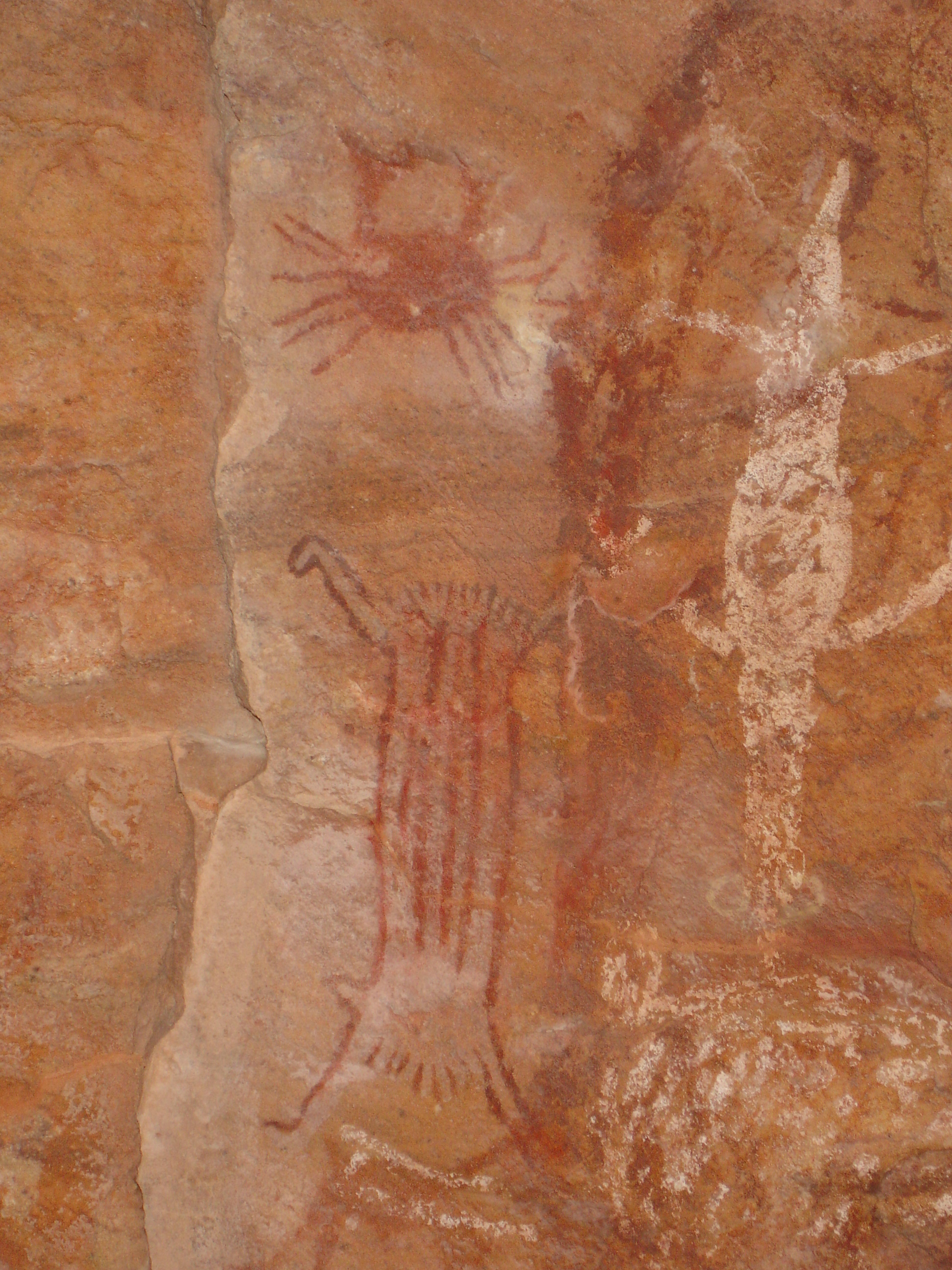
Painting from the site

Debate continued as of 2016 as to whether or not the artifacts and hearths are instead geofacts that were made naturally, or alternatively, made by monkeys. Wild bearded capuchin monkeys (Sapajus libidinosus) in Serra da Capivara National Park have been observed smashing stones against rocks embedded in the ground. The resulting 'shaped' rocks and flakes are similar to early hominid tools and flakes. It has been suggested that similar behavior by earlier simians might account for what have been regarded as human tools at Pedra Furada. James Adovasio of Florida Atlantic University believes that the tools identified by Guidon as human made are rocks that fell from a cliff and broke when they hit the ground. "The Pedra Furada stuff is not even up to capuchin standards", he said. The capuchin behavior also has implications for interpretations of the simplest Oldowan technology in East Africa. This seems to be a dividing line on the debate among archaeologists disputing Guidon's theory that the site's artifacts prove pre-Clovis human settlement in the Americas.

In 2000, the controversy was characterized by Alex Bellos at The Guardian as U.S. archaeologists believing that the items are geofacts created naturally, "because the North Americans cannot believe that they do not have the oldest site", while David Meltzer, of the Southern Methodist University in Dallas, Texas asked "...if we have [pre-Clovis] humans in South America, then by golly, why don't we have them in North America too?"

Responding to this, Guidon suggested a sea voyage across the Atlantic as a potential route for the first migration.

In a 2014 article in the New York Times Guidon claimed occupation of the Americas could go back 100,000 years and the first settlers 'might have come not overland from Asia but by boat from Africa'. Michael R. Waters, a geoarchaeologist at Texas A&M University noted the absence of genetic evidence in modern populations to support Guidon's claim. The Buttermilk Creek Complex in Texas was discovered in 2006 and dated at about 15,500 BP.

Guidon has said that, "The carbon is not from a natural fire. It is only found inside the sites. You don't get natural fires inside the shelters", and adding that "The problem is that the Americans criticize without knowing. The problem is not mine. The problem is theirs. Americans should excavate more and write less." French palaeolithic archaeologist Jacques Pelegrin, believes there is a possibility for natural processes creating flaked stones that could mimic the Pedra Furada specimens because of their simplicity, but he finds this very unlikely in this case because of continuous human presence in the site.

== See also ==
- Buttermilk Creek Complex – Salado, Texas
- Caverna da Pedra Pintada
- Solutrean hypothesis
- Museum of the American Man
- Abrigo de Santa Elina

== Bibliography ==
- AIMOLA, Giulia et al. Final Pleistocene and Early Holocene at Sitio do Meio, Piauí, Brazil: Stratigraphy and comparison with Pedra Furada. Journal of Lithic Studies, [S.l.], v. 1, n. 2, p. 5-24, September. 2014. ISSN 2055-0472. Available at: <https://journals.ed.ac.uk/lithicstudies/article/view/1125/1631>. Date accessed: 16 April 2016 doi:10.2218/jls.v1i2.1125
- Meltzer, D. H., 2021. First peoples in a new world: Populating ice age America. Cambridge University Press.
- Nash, G. H. 2009. Serra de Capivara: America's Oldest Art. Current World Archaeology. Issue 37, pp. 41–46.
