= Jangada, Mato Grosso =

Jangada
- Municipality
- The Municipality of Jangada
- Location of Jangada in Maranhão state
- Coordinates: 15°14′09″S 56°29′20″W
- Country: Brazil
- Region: Central-West
- State: Mato Grosso
- Founded: December 2, 1945

Government
  - Mayor: Gauchino (PSD)

Area
  - Total: 1,021.939 km^{2} (394.573 sq mi)
- Elevation: 200 m (660 ft)

Population (2020)
  - Total: 8,451
  - Density: 0.3/km^{2} (0.78/sq mi)
- Time zone: UTC−3 (BRT)
- HDI (2000): 0.680 – medium

Jangada is a municipality in the Brazilian state of Mato Grosso.

Noteworthy is the presence of the archaeological site Abrigo de Santa Elina, with human remains as old as 27,000 years ago.
