= Santa Luz, Piauí =

Coordinates: 8.95389°S 44.1289°W

Santa Luz
- Municipality
- Location in Piauí
- Country: Brazil
- Region: Nordeste
- State: Piauí
- Mesoregion: Semi Árido Baiano

Population (2020)
  - Total: 5,882
- Time zone: UTC−3 (BRT)

Santa Luz is a municipality in the state of Piauí in the Northeast region of Brazil.

The municipality contains part of the 823,843 hectares (2,035,760 acres) Serra das Confusões National Park, created in 1998, which protects an area of the Caatinga biome.

== See also ==
- List of municipalities in Piauí
