= Museum of the American Man =

Brazilian museum

- Museu do Homem Americano
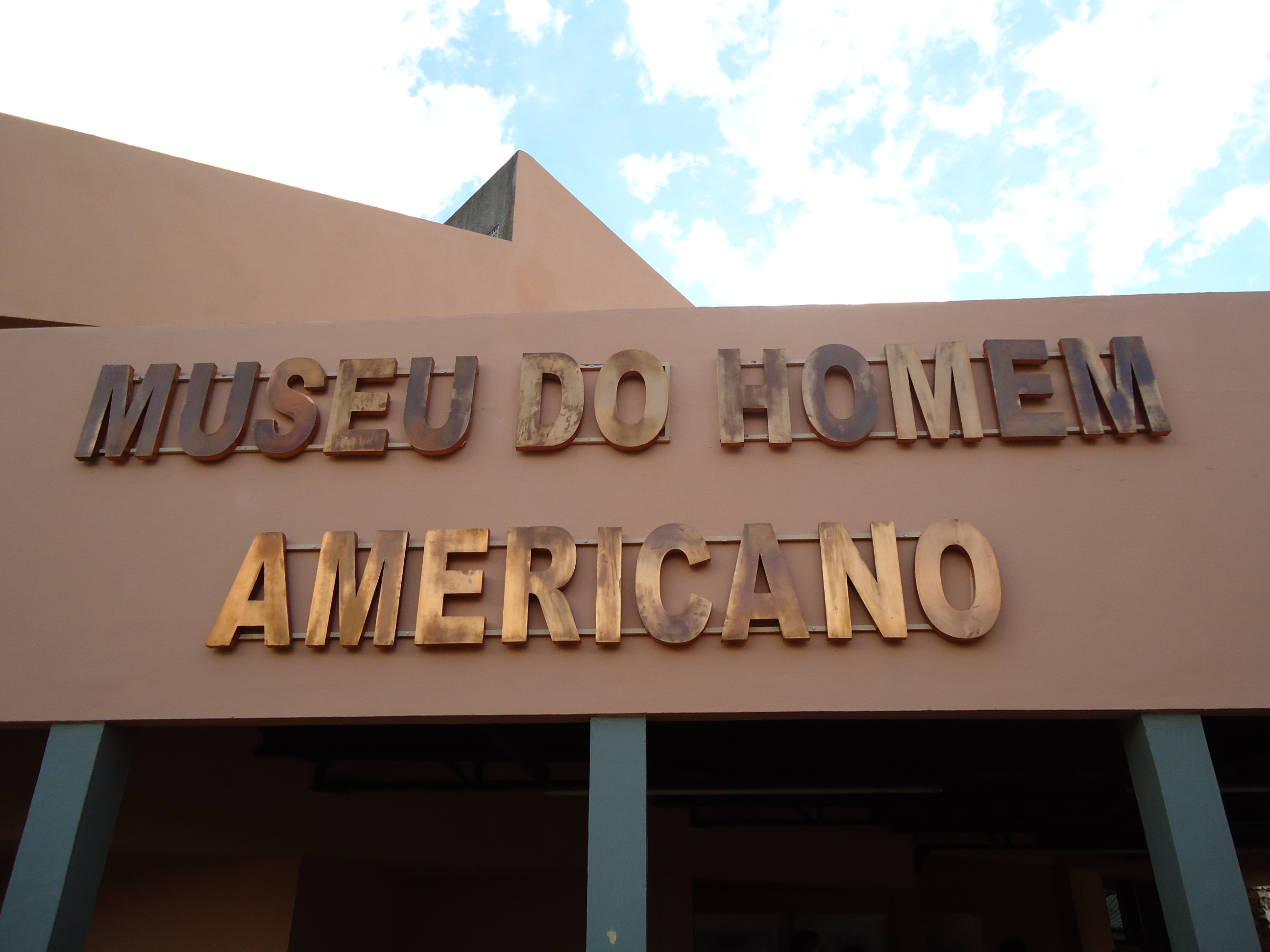
- Location: São Raimundo Nonato, Piauí; Brazil
- Coordinates: 9°1′58.995″S 42°42′1.982″W
- Type: Archaeological
- Website: http://fumdham.org.br/

The Museum of the American Man (Portuguese: Museu do Homem Americano) is a museum located in the municipality of São Raimundo Nonato, in the state of Piauí, which is also home to the Serra da Capivara National Park, one of the country's main archaeological conservation places, with more than 700 archaeological sites that contain paintings dated back to more than 12 thousand years ago.

The building is inside the headquarters of the Museum of the American Man Foundation (FUMDHAM), which is responsible for the museum and was created from a cooperation between Brazilian and French scientists who have been working in this region since 1973. It is a non-profit organization, but works in partnership with the municipal, state, and federal governments. In addition, FUMDHAM is also a civil and philanthropic society.

In early 2017, the Museum of the American Man began to be responsible for the permanent monitoring and management committee of the Serra da Capivara National Park, a shared management model instituted by the Piauí state government and Brazil's Ministry of Culture. This administration system also integrates the Chico Mendes Institute for Biodiversity Conservation (ICMBio) and the National Institute of Historic and Artistic Heritage (Iphan).

The site's collection includes many pieces found over more than 40 years of archaeological research and work within the park. Regular updates are made, as new discoveries may be made at any time. Besides the exhibits, the museum has technical reserves, which store archeological, paleontological, zoological, and botanical pieces and materials, along with laboratories.

The museum has already been named as Sérgio Motta Cultural Center and is strongly associated with the research of Niède Guidon, who discovered the site in the 1970s and created the Museum of American Man Foundation in the following decade in order to "understand the biome of the region, the reconstitution of the human past and its adaptation to the environment, in the different environmental realities through which the region has passed, since the first occupation."

== Permanent exhibition ==
The focus of the permanent exhibition, whose collection has approximately 90 pieces, is the trajectory of the human being, starting 100,000 years ago, at the beginning of the evolution of hominids, and going all the way to the arrival of the European colonizers in America. It brings theoretical elements on how the American continent was populated and on the evolution of prehistoric men, between the Pleistocene and Holocene periods, in addition to items such as funerary urns, lapidary objects, drawings, skeletons, bones, and characterization of the region's fauna and flora in the past. It is still possible to learn more about the excavations at Boqueirão da Pedra Furada, known as the oldest archaeological site on the American continent.

At the end of the exhibition, the visitor can see genuine bones, images, and engravings drawn on the walls of the reserve, as well as a description of a survey of the vast fauna that the region used to hold. The final part of the collection houses a display of the current biodiversity of the Serra da Capivara National Park. Besides the preservation of archeological findings and the permanent exhibition, the site also studies the interaction between man and the environment, from prehistoric times to the present day. In addition, the Museum is an important center for scientific research on the morphology of ancestor skulls, and is one of the only archaeological centers in Brazil where it is possible to make analyses on the evolution of these bones from the Holocene era.

== See also ==
- Chico Mendes Institute for Biodiversity Conservation
- National Institute of Historic and Artistic Heritage
