= Caracol, Piauí =

Coordinates: 9.27889°S 43.33°W

Caracol
- Municipality
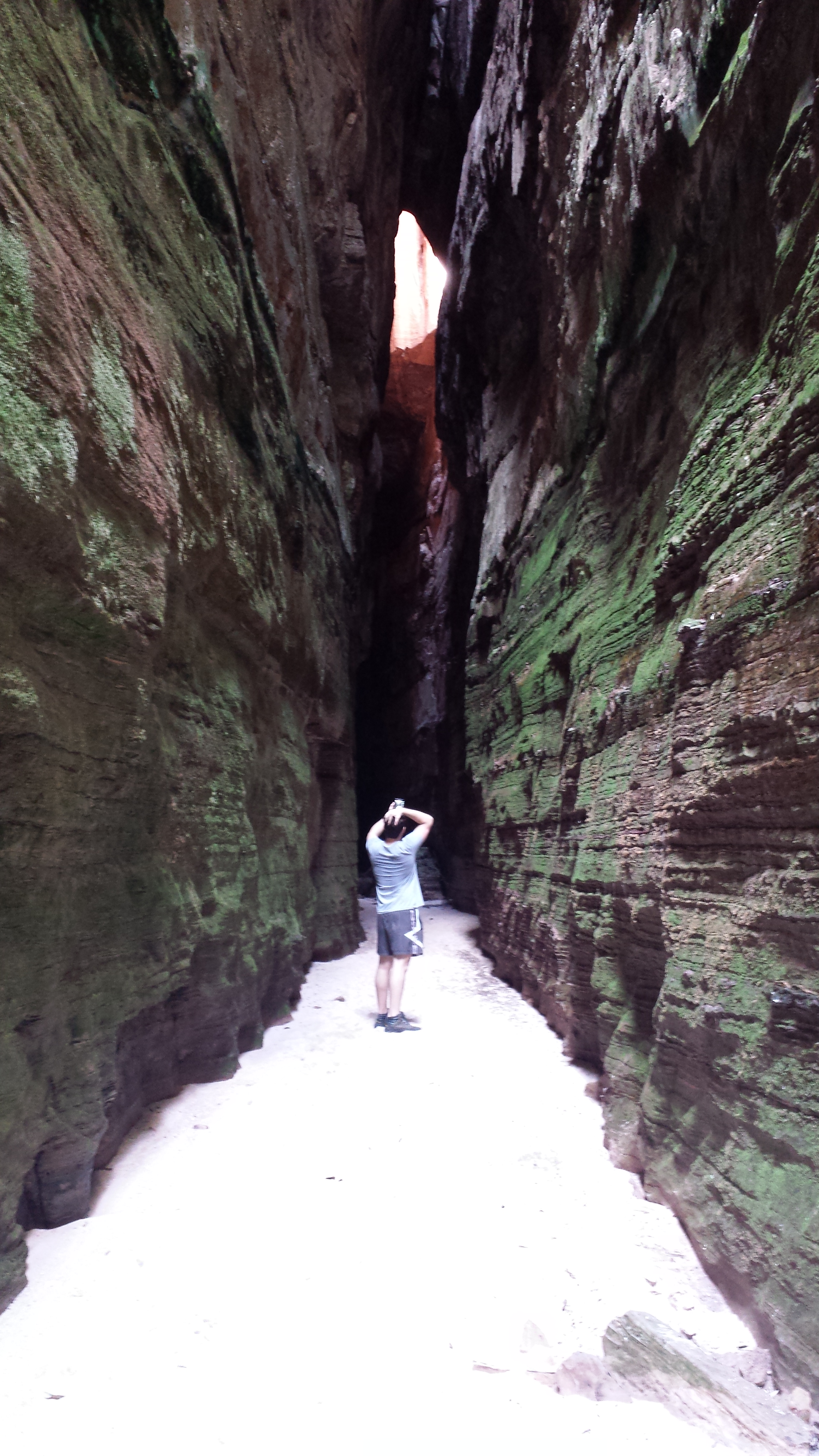

- Location in Piauí
- Country: Brazil
- Region: Nordeste
- State: Piauí
- Mesoregion: Sudoeste Piauiense

Population (2020)
  - Total: 10,964
- Time zone: UTC−3 (BRT)

Caracol is a municipality in the state of Piauí in the Northeast region of Brazil.

The municipality contains part of the 823,843 hectares (2,035,760 acres) Serra das Confusões National Park, created in 1998, which protects an area of the Caatinga biome. The municipality is in the Capivara-Confusões Ecological Corridor, created in 2006 to link the Serra da Capivara National Park to the Serra das Confusões National Park.

== Climate ==
Climate data for Caracol, Piauí (1981–2010)
Month	Jan	Feb	Mar	Apr	May	Jun	Jul	Aug	Sep	Oct	Nov	Dec	Year
Mean daily maximum °C (°F)	30.6 (87.1)	30.4 (86.7)	30.2 (86.4)	30.5 (86.9)	30.9 (87.6)	30.8 (87.4)	31.1 (88.0)	32.3 (90.1)	33.9 (93.0)	34.4 (93.9)	33.0 (91.4)	31.4 (88.5)	31.6 (88.9)
Daily mean °C (°F)	24.8 (76.6)	24.5 (76.1)	24.4 (75.9)	24.3 (75.7)	24.0 (75.2)	23.3 (73.9)	23.3 (73.9)	24.4 (75.9)	26.1 (79.0)	27.3 (81.1)	26.4 (79.5)	25.3 (77.5)	24.8 (76.6)
Mean daily minimum °C (°F)	20.1 (68.2)	19.9 (67.8)	20.0 (68.0)	19.6 (67.3)	18.5 (65.3)	16.9 (62.4)	16.4 (61.5)	17.1 (62.8)	18.8 (65.8)	20.4 (68.7)	20.4 (68.7)	20.3 (68.5)	19.0 (66.2)
Average precipitation mm (inches)	131.5 (5.18)	121.3 (4.78)	126.5 (4.98)	79.1 (3.11)	18.0 (0.71)	1.1 (0.04)	0.6 (0.02)	0.0 (0.0)	5.0 (0.20)	36.5 (1.44)	86.9 (3.42)	107.1 (4.22)	713.6 (28.09)
Average precipitation days (≥ 1.0 mm)	10	10	10	8	3	0	0	0	0	3	7	9	60
Average relative humidity (%)	71.0	75.4	76.6	73.6	66.4	58.7	53.0	49.7	46.6	50.1	58.4	68.3	62.3
Mean monthly sunshine hours	209.6	184.1	196.0	224.2	250.8	262.0	295.5	312.7	288.9	269.6	231.7	211.4	2,936.5
Source: Instituto Nacional de Meteorologia

== See also ==
- List of municipalities in Piauí
