= Alvorada do Gurguéia =

Coordinates: 8.42389°S 43.7769°W

- Municipality
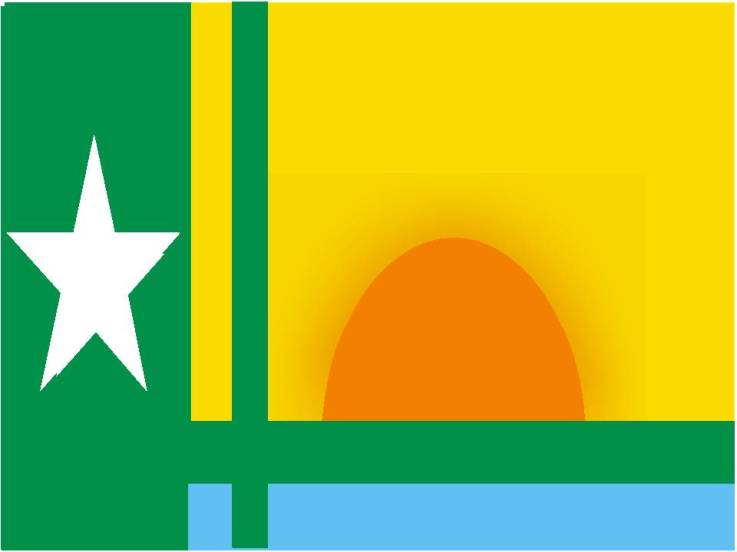
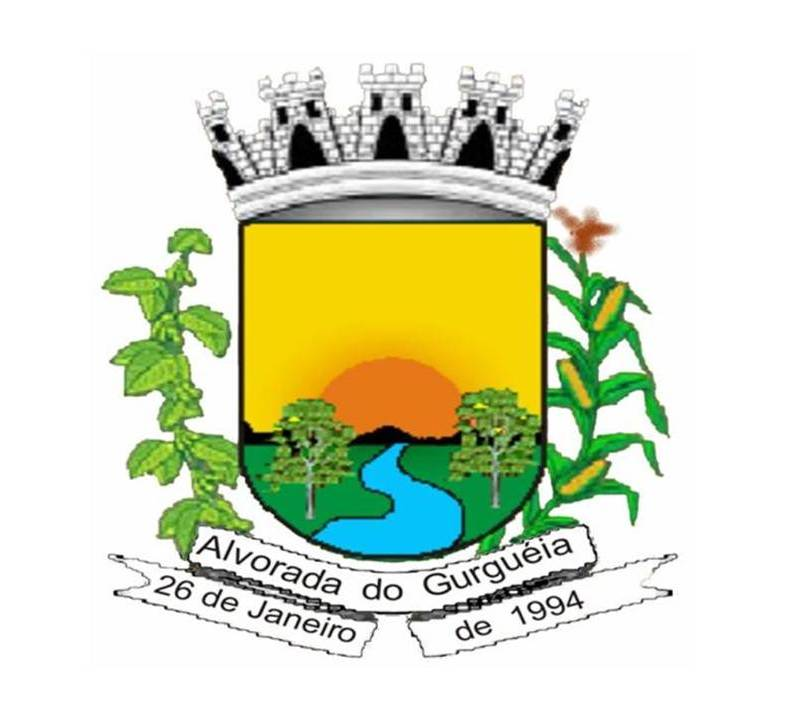
- Flag Coat of arms

- Location in Piauí

- Location in Brazil
- Country: Brazil
- Region: Nordeste
- State: Piauí
- Mesoregion: Sudoeste Piauiense

Population (2020)
  - Total: 5,445
- Time zone: UTC−3 (BRT)

Alvorada do Gurguéia is a municipality in the state of Piauí in the Northeast region of Brazil.

The municipality contains part of the 823,843 hectares (2,035,760 acres) Serra das Confusões National Park, created in 1998, which protects an area of the Caatinga biome.

== See also ==
- List of municipalities in Piauí
