= Abrigo de Santa Elina =

Archaeological site in Mato Grosso, Brazil

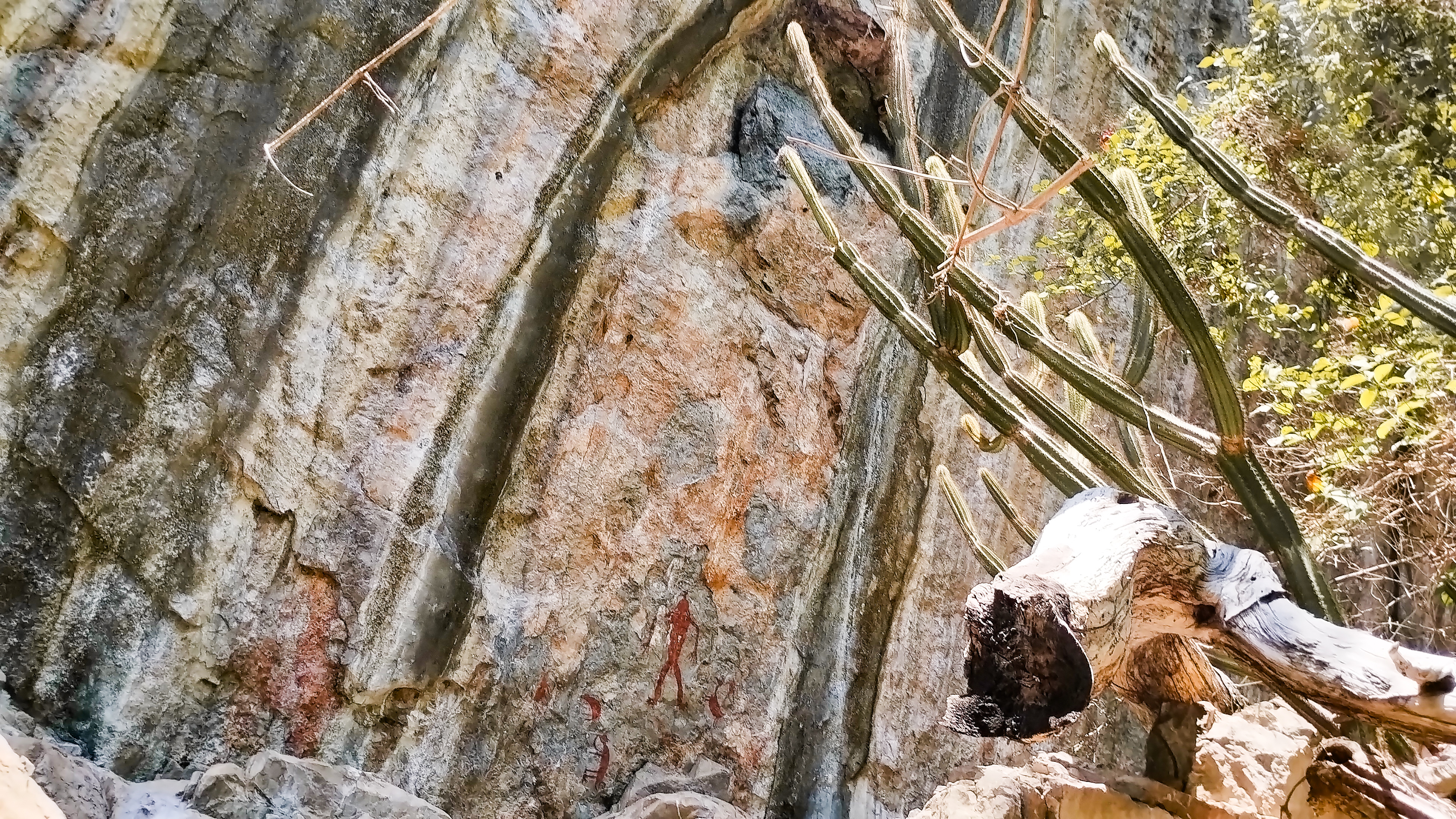
Rocky shelter of Santa Elina in 2023

The Abrigo de Santa Elina is a rocky archaeological site located in the Serra das Araras mountain range, in the municipality of Jangada, Mato Grosso, 82 km from Cuiabá, and is considered the second oldest in Brazil due to the presence of human remains, indicating human occupation dating back as far as 27,000 years ago.

Excavations were conducted between 1984 and 2004, reaching a maximum depth of 3.5 m, at which point the full extent of three stratigraphic units was documented. Based on the stratigraphic sequences, this rock shelter was first occupied during the Pleistocene 27,000 years ago, and subsequently, during the Holocene, there were successive occupations dating from 11,000 to 2,000 years ago.

Numerous Glossotherium bones and 300 stone tools were found. Two modified osteoderms suggest a dynamic relationship between hunter and prey. In 2023, it was demonstrated that three giant sloth osteoderms were intentionally modified into personal artifacts prior to the fossilization of the bones. This provides further evidence of the coexistence of humans and megafauna, as well as of human craftsmanship in the creation of personal artifacts from the bones of ground sloths.

== See also ==
- Pedra Furada
- Peopling of the Americas

== Bibliography ==
- Agueda Vilhena-Vialou (1987). Santa Elina : fouilles dans un abri rupestre du Mato Grosso, Brésil. Bulletin de la Société préhistorique française. p. 407-410
- Denis Vialou (1987). Les peintures pariétales de Santa Elina, Mato Grosso, Brésil. Bulletin de la Société préhistorique française. p. 403-406
