= Canto do Buriti =

Coordinates: 8°07′S 42°58′W

- Municipality
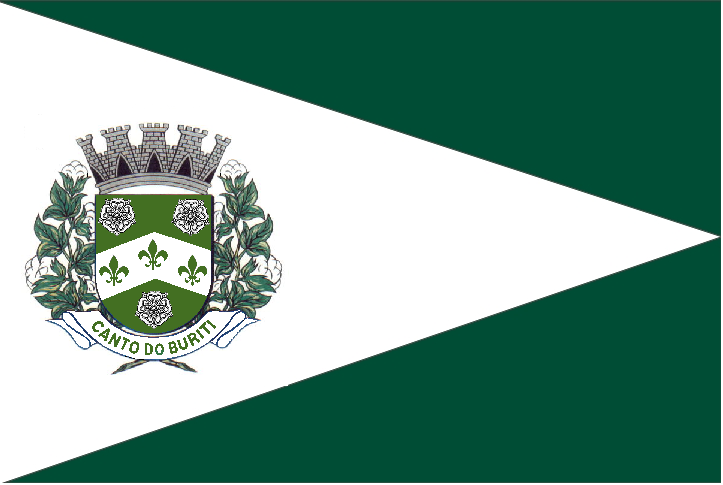
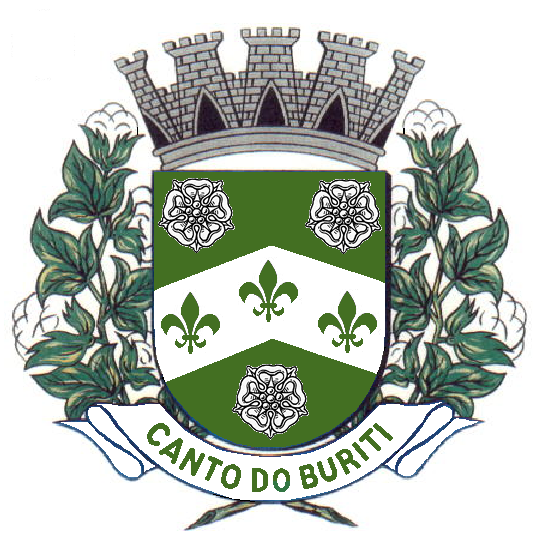
- Flag Coat of arms

- Location in Piauí
- Country: Brazil
- Region: Nordeste
- State: Piauí
- Mesoregion: Sudoeste Piauiense
- Founded: July 07, 1915

Population (2020)
  - Total: 21,258
- Time zone: UTC−3 (BRT)

Canto do Buriti is a municipality in the state of Piauí in the Northeast region of Brazil.

The municipality contains part of the 823,843-hectare (2,035,760-acre) Serra das Confusões National Park, created in 1998, which protects an area of the Caatinga biome. The municipality is in the Capivara-Confusões Ecological Corridor, created in 2006 to link the Serra da Capivara National Park to the Serra das Confusões National Park.

== See also ==
- List of municipalities in Piauí
