= São Raimundo Nonato =

Coordinates: 9°00′54″S 42°41′56″W

- Flag Coat of arms

- Location of São Raimundo Nonato
- Country: Brazil
- Region: Northeast
- State: Piauí
- Founded: June 26, 1912

Area
  - Total: 2,427.894 km^{2} (937.415 sq mi)

Population (2020)
  - Total: 34,877
  - Density: 14.365/km^{2} (37.206/sq mi)
- Time zone: UTC−3 (BRT)
- Website: São Raimundo Nonato (in Portuguese)

São Raimundo Nonato is a city located in the southern region of the state of the Piauí, Brazil, and is 576 km away from the capital, Teresina. It is known as the city where the administration (and part of) the Serra da Capivara National Park is located.

The city is served by Niède Guidon–Serra da Capivara Airport.

The municipality is in the Capivara-Confusões Ecological Corridor, created in 2006 to link the Serra da Capivara National Park to the Serra das Confusões National Park.

== See also ==
- Museum of the American Man
