= Cristino Castro =

Coordinates: 8°49′S 44°13′W

- Municipality
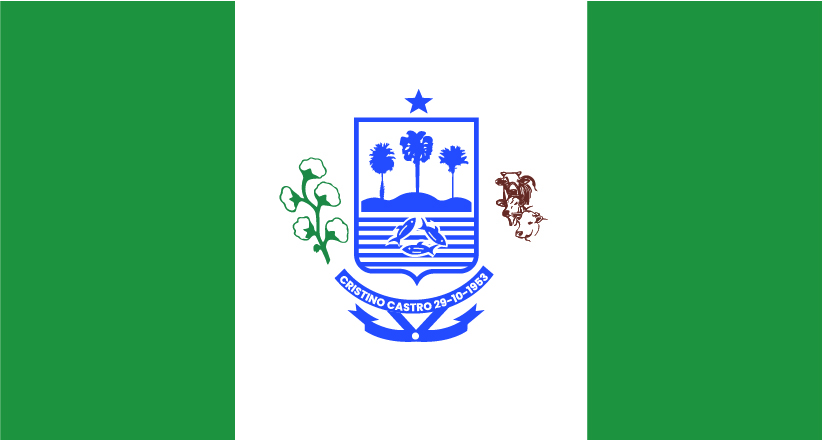
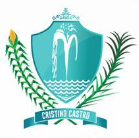
- Flag Coat of arms

- Location in Piauí
- Country: Brazil
- Region: Nordeste
- State: Piauí
- Mesoregion: Sudoeste Piauiense

Population (2020)
  - Total: 10,444
- Time zone: UTC−3 (BRT)

Cristino Castro is a municipality in the state of Piauí in the Northeast region of Brazil. A significant production of cacao, latex and bananas takes place in the region.

The municipality contains part of the 823,843 hectares (2,035,760 acres) Serra das Confusões National Park, created in 1998, which protects an area of the Caatinga biome.

== Climate ==
Climate data for Cristino Castro (1991–2020)
Month	Jan	Feb	Mar	Apr	May	Jun	Jul	Aug	Sep	Oct	Nov	Dec	Year
Mean daily maximum °C (°F)	32.4 (90.3)	32.0 (89.6)	32.1 (89.8)	32.8 (91.0)	33.8 (92.8)	34.4 (93.9)	34.7 (94.5)	36.1 (97.0)	37.3 (99.1)	37.1 (98.8)	35.0 (95.0)	33.4 (92.1)	34.3 (93.7)
Mean daily minimum °C (°F)	21.0 (69.8)	21.0 (69.8)	21.1 (70.0)	20.8 (69.4)	20.1 (68.2)	18.6 (65.5)	18.3 (64.9)	19.4 (66.9)	21.2 (70.2)	22.3 (72.1)	22.0 (71.6)	21.2 (70.2)	20.6 (69.1)
Average precipitation mm (inches)	149.3 (5.88)	152.1 (5.99)	163.3 (6.43)	105.2 (4.14)	34.4 (1.35)	1.8 (0.07)	0.2 (0.01)	1.1 (0.04)	8.3 (0.33)	49.2 (1.94)	91.3 (3.59)	111.4 (4.39)	867.6 (34.16)
Average precipitation days (≥ 1.0 mm)	11	11	12	9	4	1	0	0	1	5	6	10	70
Mean monthly sunshine hours	179.0	167.3	184.9	220.1	260.0	281.1	302.3	312.1	288.6	263.6	206.7	156.3	2,822
Source: Instituto Nacional de Meteorologia (precipitation days 1981–2010)

== See also ==
- List of municipalities in Piauí
