= Toca da Tira Peia =

Rock shelter archaeological site in Brazil

- location in Brazil
- 8°48′32″S 42°21′16″W
- Location: Coronel José Dias, Piauí
- Region: near Serra da Capivara National Park, Brazil

Toca da Tira Peia is a rock shelter site, located in the municipality Coronel José Dias, Piauí state, near the Serra da Capivara National Park, Brazil, thought to hold evidence of prehistoric human presence in South America dating to 22,000 years ago.

== Site ==
The Toca da Tira Peia rockshelter was discovered in 2008. There are four well preserved sediment layers, the youngest of which dates to 4,000 years BP. 113 knapped stone tools and artifacts have been recovered.

The site has been dated through optically stimulated luminescence technique.

"Digging turned up 113 stone artifacts consisting of tools and tool debris in five soil layers. Using a technique that measures natural radiation damage in excavated quartz grains, the scientists estimated that the last exposure of soil to sunlight ranged from about 4,000 years ago in the top layer to 22,000 years ago in the third layer."

According to the authors, this site offers some advantages to the other sites such as Pedra Furada in regard to dating. As opposed to the Pedra Furada sites, Toca da Tira Peia doesn't have so many naturally occurring pebbles that can be confused with those that “were brought and knapped by human beings”.

Also, the authors claim that the Toca da Tira Peia artifacts “are in their original position; they had not been subject to movements since their burial”.

== See also ==
- Pedra Furada sites
- Caverna da Pedra Pintada

== Bibliography ==
- Luis Alberto Borrero (March 2016). "Ambiguity and Debates on the Early Peopling of South America". PaleoAmerica. 2: 11–21. doi:10.1080/20555563.2015.1136498. hdl:11336/43075.
- German Dziebel, THE TOCA DA TIRA PEIA SITE AND THE END OF AN ICE AGE IN AMERICAN ARCHAEOLOGY. Anthropogenesis, April 24, 2013
