= Coronel José Dias =

- Municipality
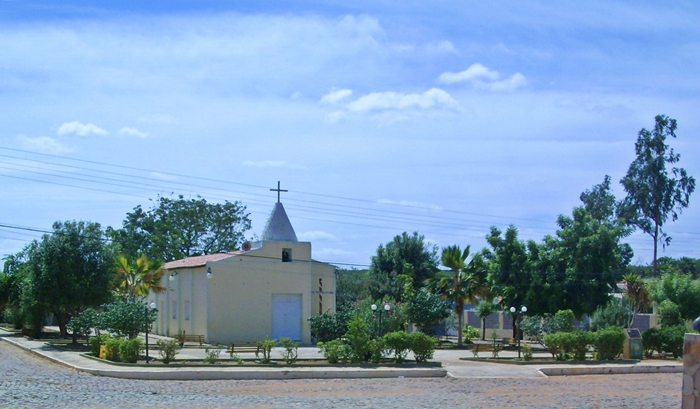

- Location in Brazil
- Coordinates: 8.81583°S 42.5128°W
- Country: Brazil
- Region: Nordeste
- State: Piauí
- Mesoregion: Sudoeste Piauiense

Population (2020)
  - Total: 4,685
- Time zone: UTC−3 (BRT)

Coronel José Dias is a municipality in the state of Piauí in the Northeast region of Brazil.

== See also ==
- List of municipalities in Piauí
