= Serra das Confusões National Park =

National park in Piauí, Brazil

- Parque Nacional da Serra das Confusões
- IUCN category II (national park)
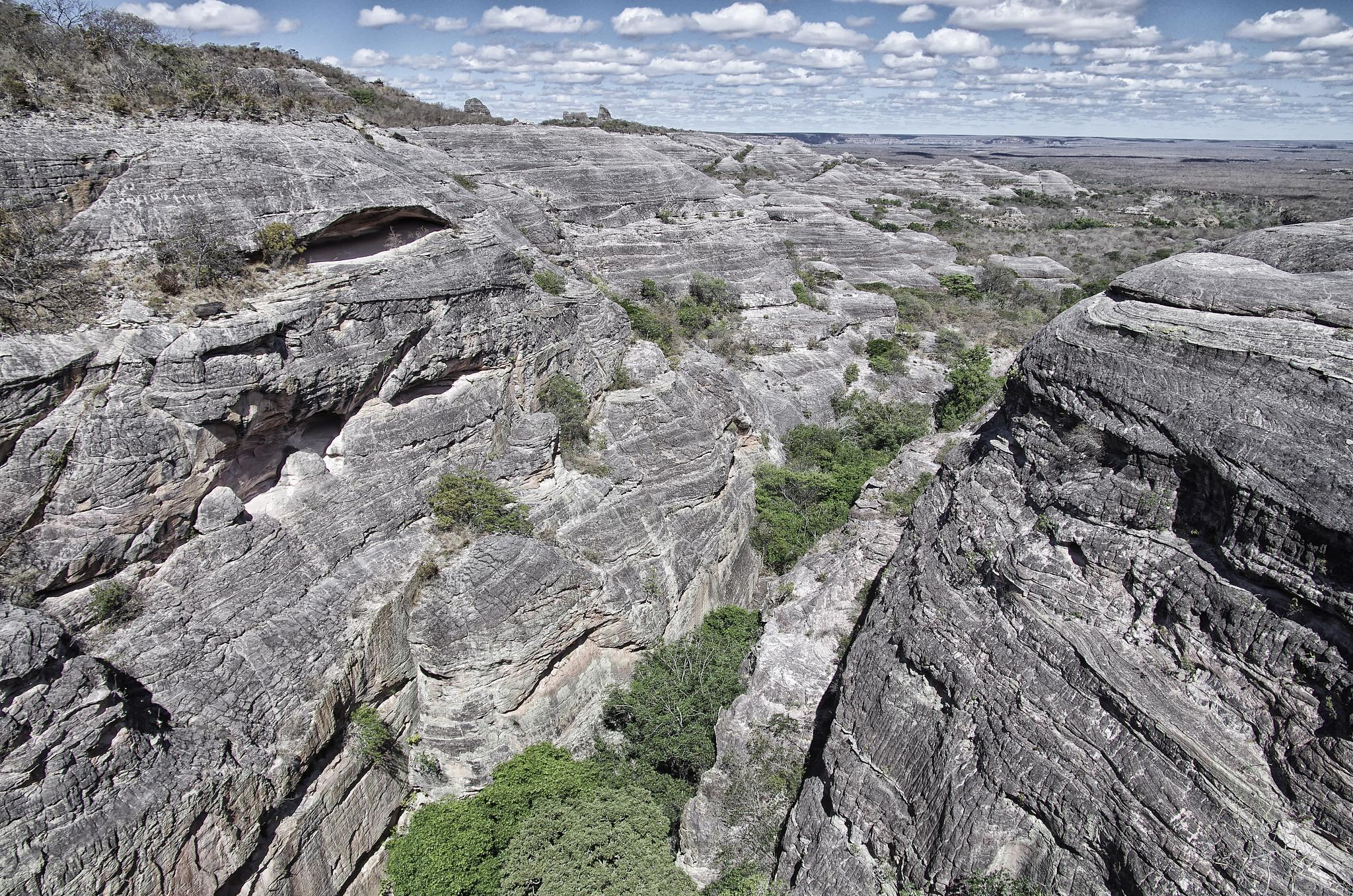
- Rocky landscape in the park

- Location within Brazil
- Nearest city: São Raimundo Nonato, Piauí
- Coordinates: 8°56′53″S 43°34′34″W
- Area: 823,843.08 hectares (2,035,760.6 acres)
- Designation: National park
- Created: 2 October 1998
- Administrator: Chico Mendes Institute for Biodiversity Conservation

The Serra das Confusões National Park (Portuguese: Parque Nacional da Serra das Confusões) is a national park in the state of Piauí, Brazil.

== Geography ==
The Serra das Confusões National Park is in the municipalities of Alvorada do Gurguéia, Brejo do Piauí, Bom Jesus, Canto do Buriti, Caracol, Cristino Castro, Guaribas, Jurema, Santa Luz and Tamboril do Piauí in the state of Piauí. It has an area of 823,843.08 hectares (2,035,760.6 acres).

=== Geomorphology ===
The park lies in the Piauí-Maranhão sedimentary basin plateau, a section of the Parnaíba basin that has been uplifted. Bedrock geology is mostly sandstone and shale ranging from Devonian to Triassic origin.

The terrain is relatively flat, containing sandstone plateaus and adjacent depressions of the Parnaíba depression. Altitudes range from 350 to 660 metres (1,150 to 2,170 ft) with an average altitude of 600 metres (2,000 ft). The lower portions are more rugged, with rocky outcrops holding small caves and springs of water. The intermittent Itaueira River rises in the park.

=== Climate ===
Average annual rainfall is 650 millimetres (26 in). Temperatures range from 12 to 40 °C (54 to 104 °F) with an average of 28 °C (82 °F).

== Ecology ==
The park is in the Caatinga biome. There are rainforest trees in the lower areas reaching 20 metres (66 ft) in height. Higher up the trees average about 6 metres (20 ft). The wetter valleys hold bromeliads and ferns with occasional giant trees.

13 of the 18 endemic Caatinga species of fauna have been identified. Surveys have found three new species of lizard, one new amphibian and one new turtle. Protected species in the park include the jaguar (Panthera onca), cougar (Puma concolor), giant armadillo (Priodontes maximus), Brazilian three-banded armadillo (Tolypeutes tricinctus), white-browed guan (Penelope jacucaca) and bearded bellbird (Procnias averano).

== Administrative history ==
The Serra das Confusões National Park was created by federal decree on 2 October 1998, and is administered by the Chico Mendes Institute for Biodiversity Conservation. The park is classed as IUCN protected area category II (national park). The objective is to preserve a natural ecosystem of great ecological relevance and scenic beauty, and to support scientific research, environmental education and interpretation, outdoors recreation and ecotourism. The Capivara-Confusões Ecological Corridor, created in 2006, links the park to the Serra da Capivara National Park.

== Gallery ==
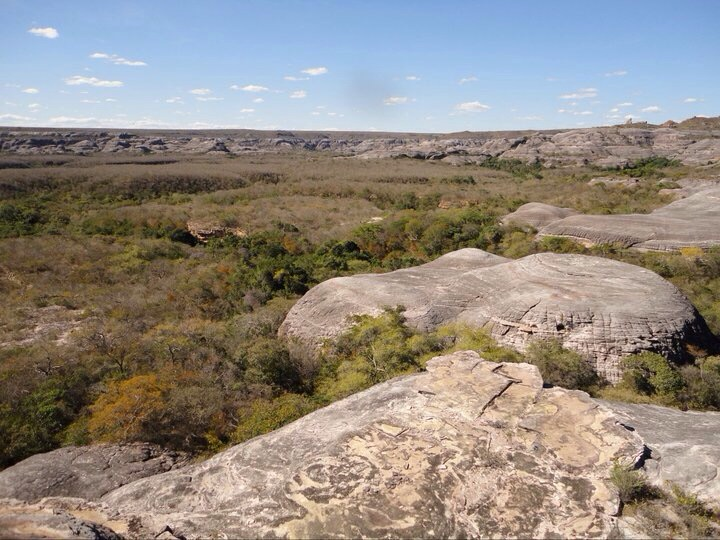

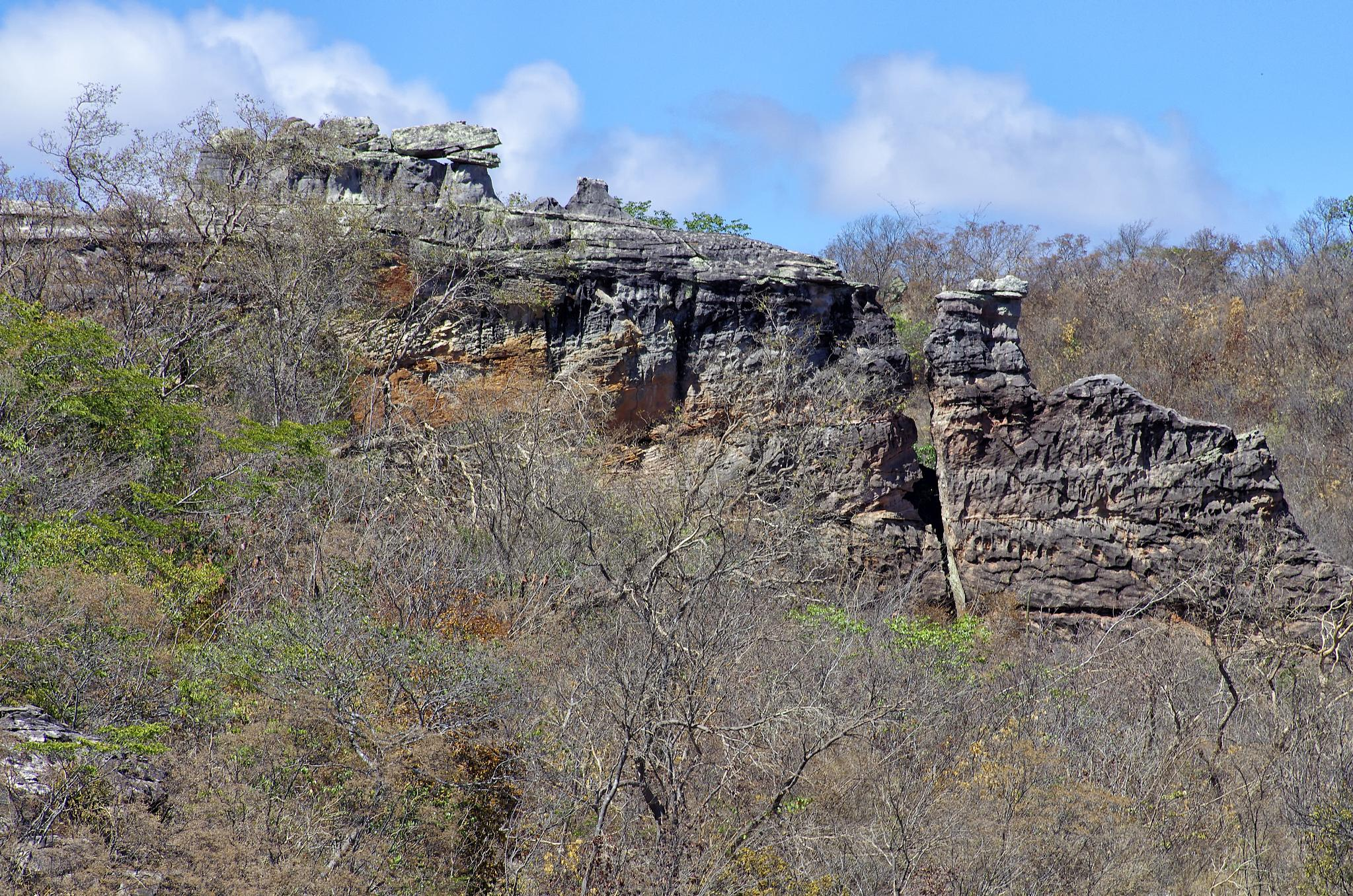

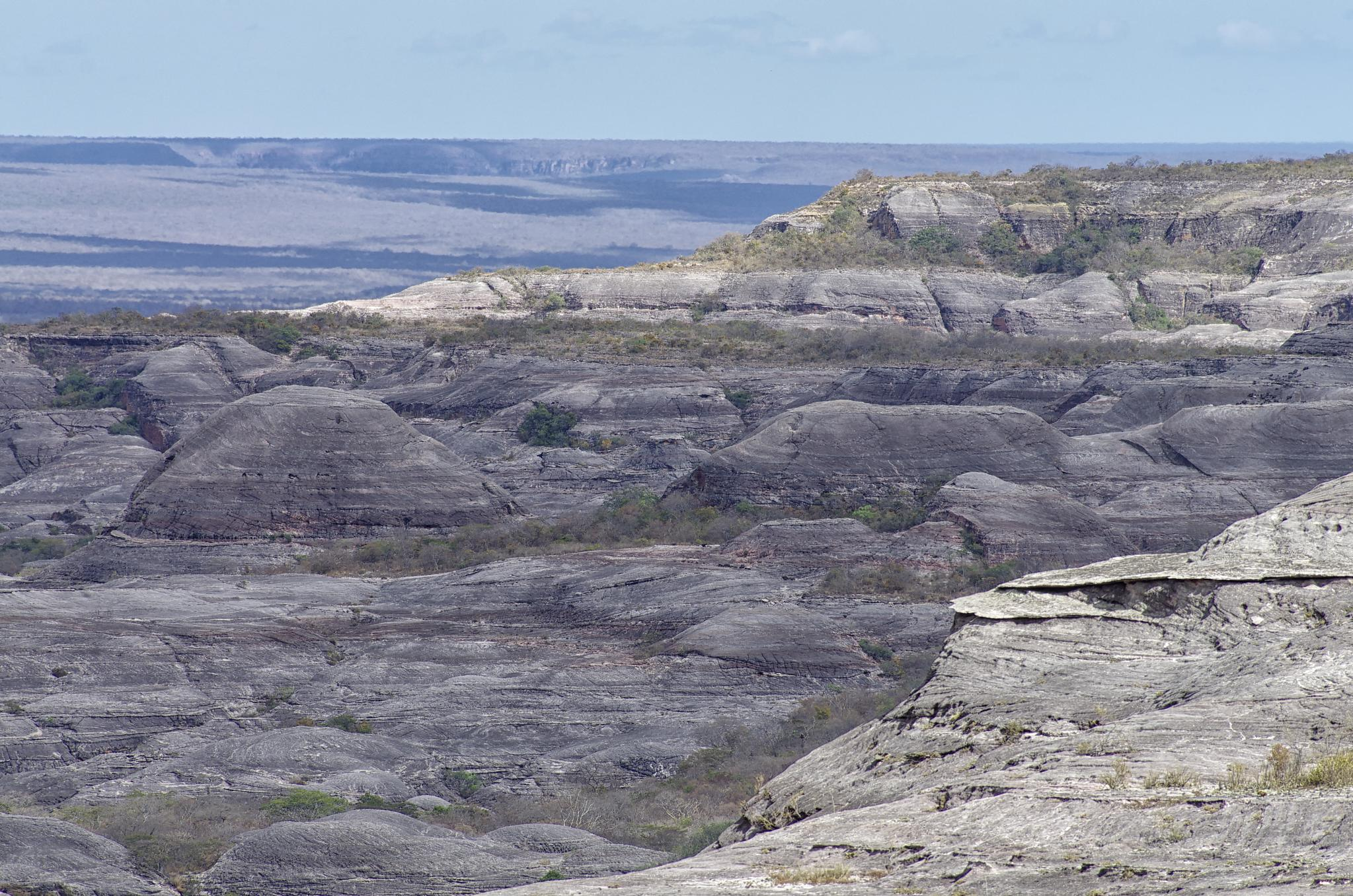

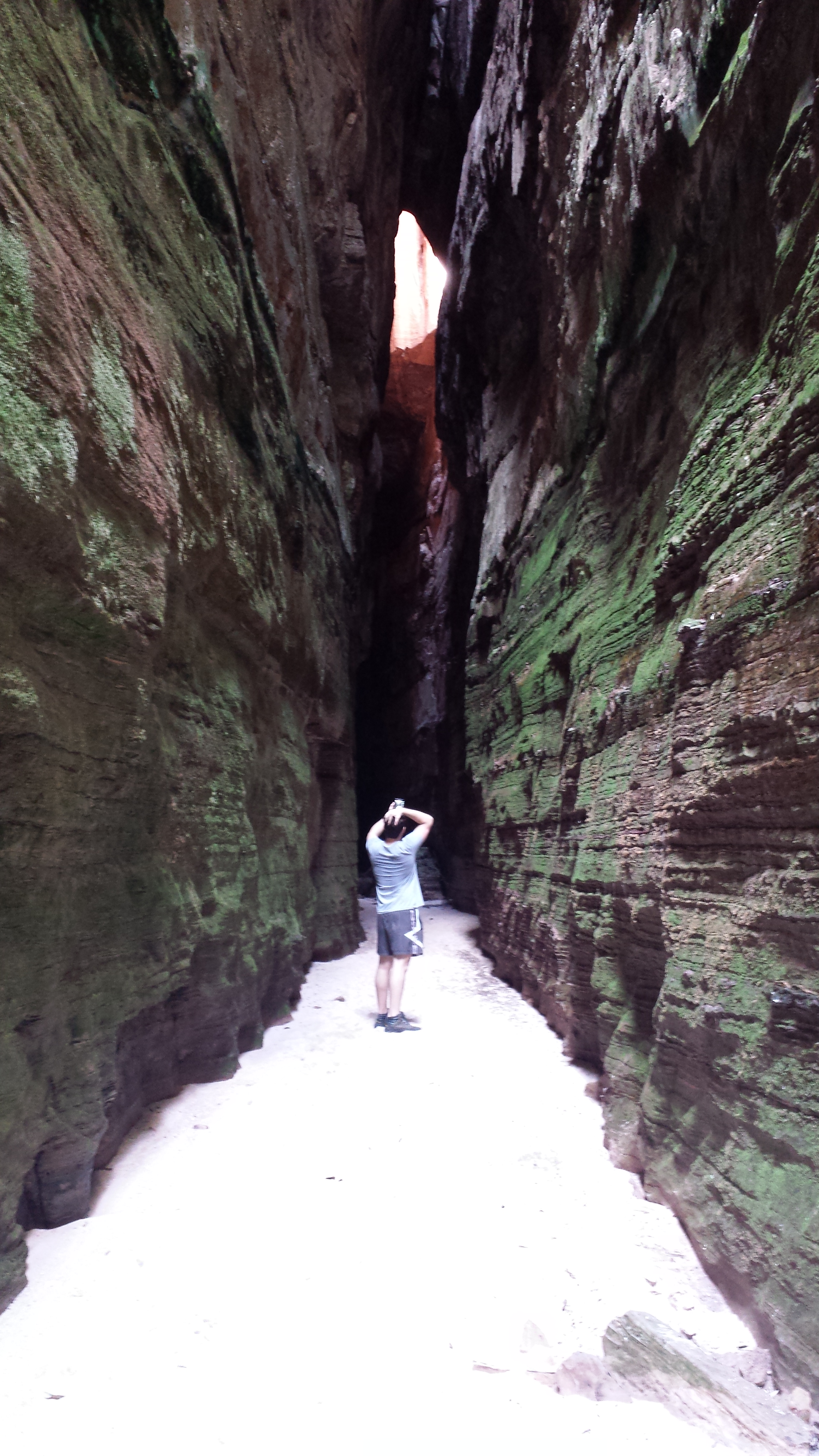

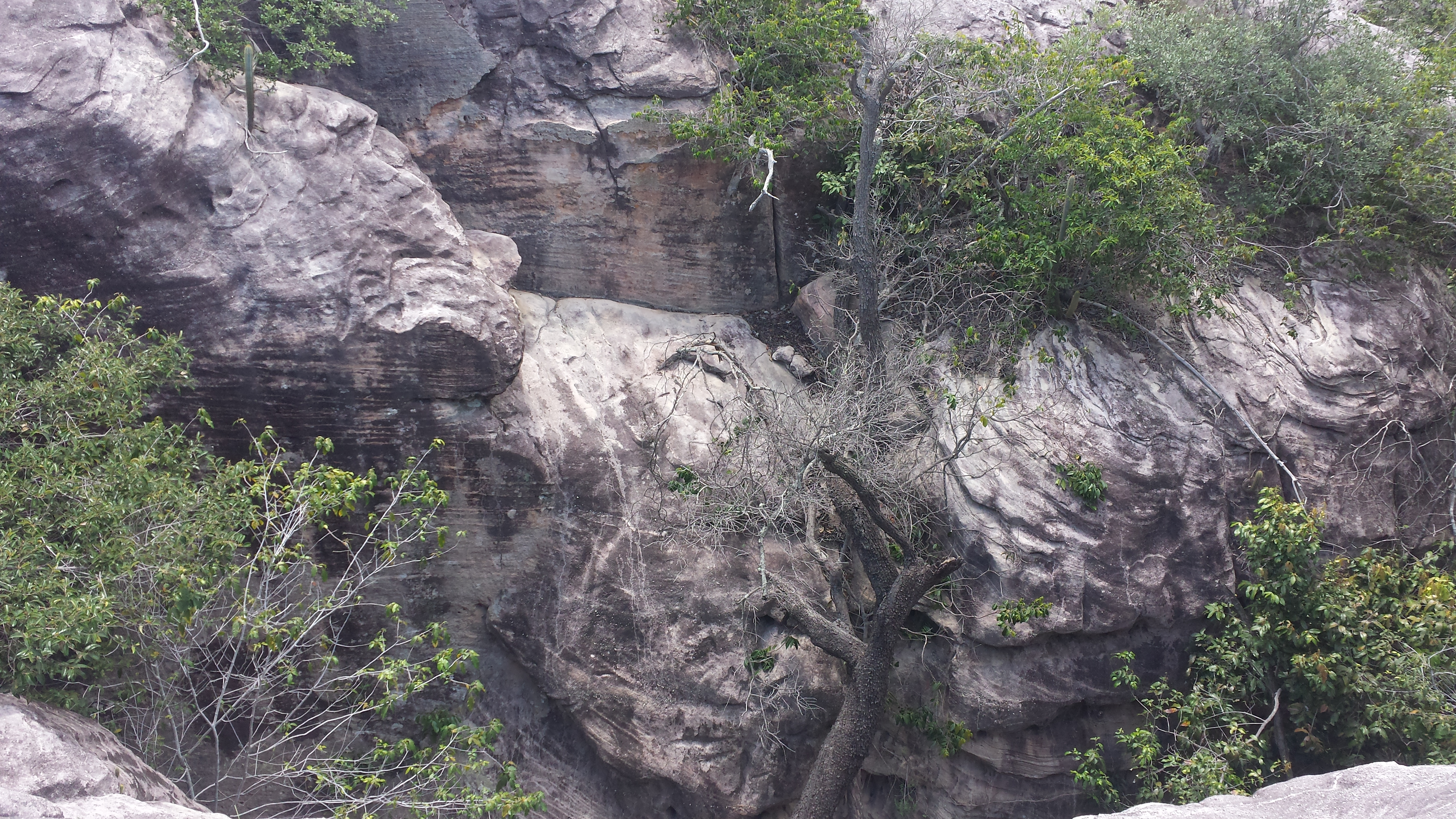

== Sources ==
- Parna da Serra das Confusões (in Portuguese), Chico Mendes Institute for Biodiversity Conservation, archived from the original on 2016-08-19
- Serras da Capivara e das Confusões serão unidas por corredor ecológico (in Portuguese), MMA, 11 March 2005, archived from the original on 2016-11-05
- Unidade de Conservação: Parque Nacional Serra das Confusões (in Portuguese), MMA: Ministério do Meio Ambiente
