= Serra da Capivara National Park =

National park in Piauí, Brazil

- IUCN category II (national park)
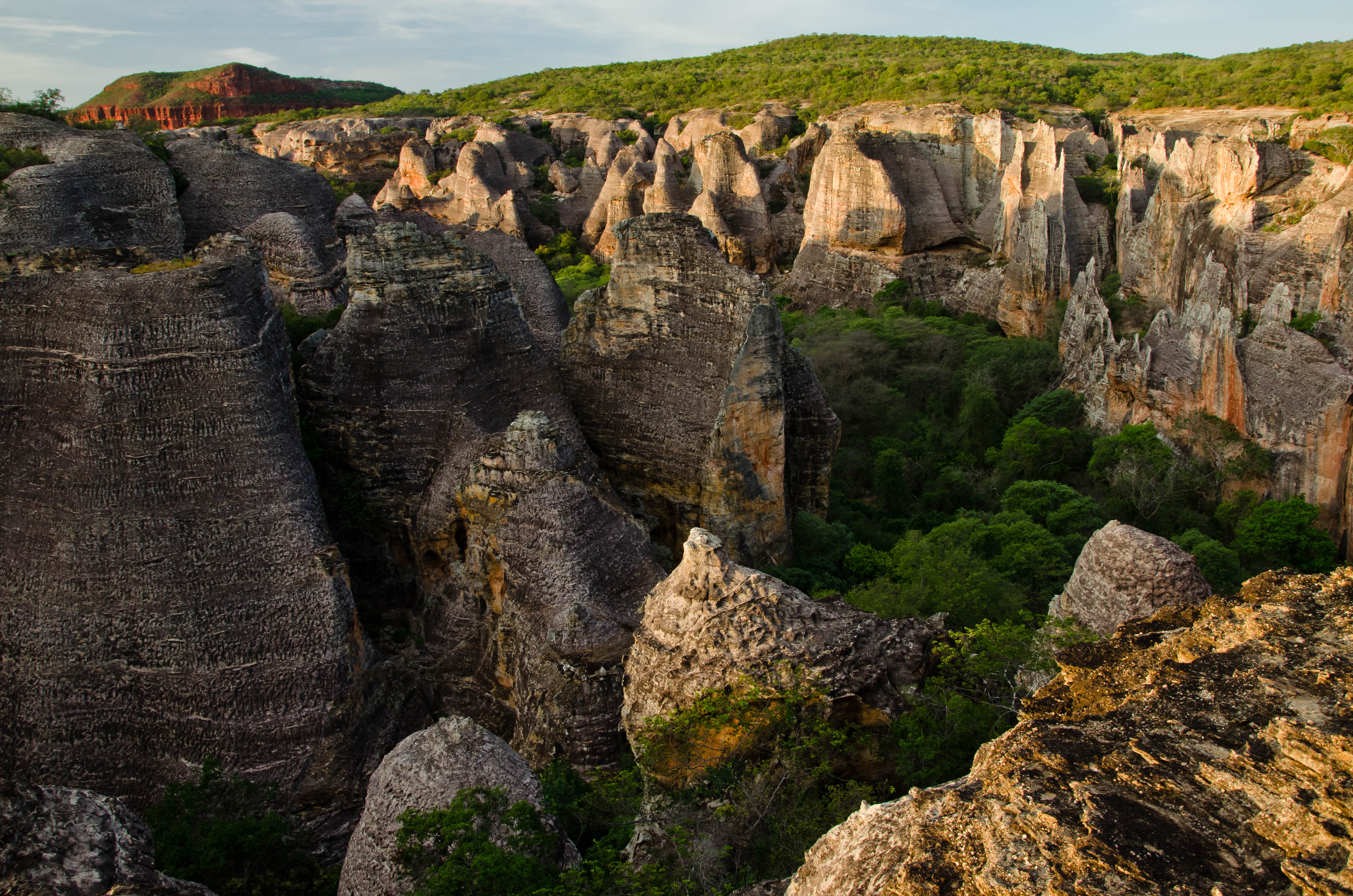

- Location within Brazil
- Interactive map of Serra da Capivara National Park
- Location: Piauí, Brazil
- Coordinates: 8°40′S 42°33′W
- Area: 1,291.4 km^{2} (498.6 sq mi)

UNESCO World Heritage Site
- Criteria: Cultural: (iii)
- Reference: 606
- Inscription: 1991 (15th Session)

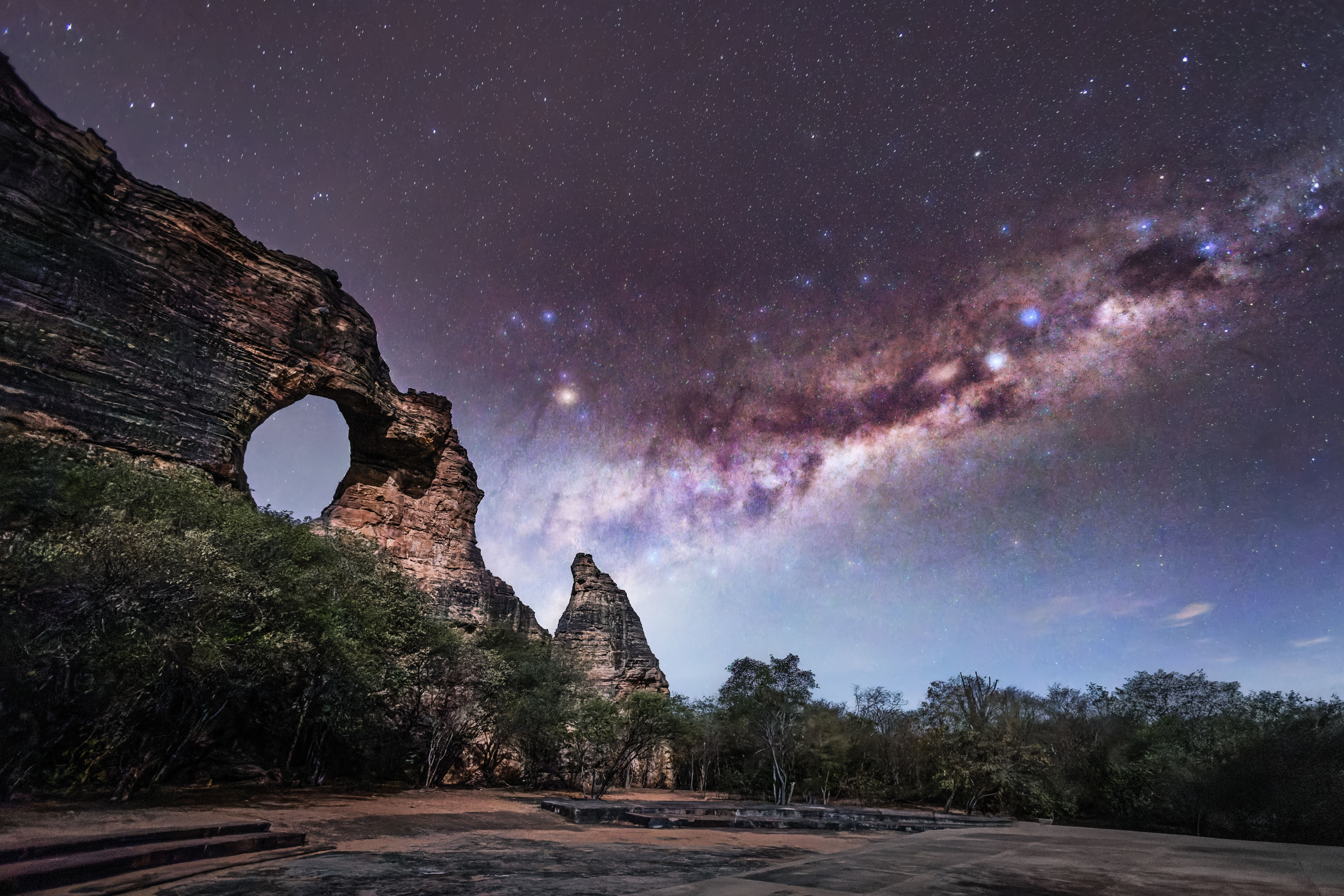
Milky way over the cliffs of Serra da Capivara national park

Serra da Capivara National Park (Portuguese: Parque Nacional Serra da Capivara, IPA: [ˈpaʁki nasi.oˈnaw ˈsɛʁɐ da kapiˈvaɾɐ, - nasjoˈnaw -]) is a national park in the Northeastern region of Brazil. The area has many prehistoric paintings.

The name of the mountain range that defines the park, Serra da Capivara, literally means "Capybara Hills" in Portuguese. This area has the largest and the oldest concentration of prehistoric sites in the Americas. Scientific studies confirm that the Capivara mountain range was densely populated in the pre-Cabraline Era.

== Location ==
It is located in northeast state of Piauí, between latitudes 8° 26' 50" and 8° 54' 23" south and longitudes 42° 19' 47" and 42° 45' 51" west. It falls within the municipal areas of São Raimundo Nonato, São João do Piauí, Coronel José Dias and Canto do Buriti. It has an area of 1291.4 square kilometres (319,000 acres).

The Capivara-Confusões Ecological Corridor, created in 2006, links the park to the Serra das Confusões National Park.

== History ==
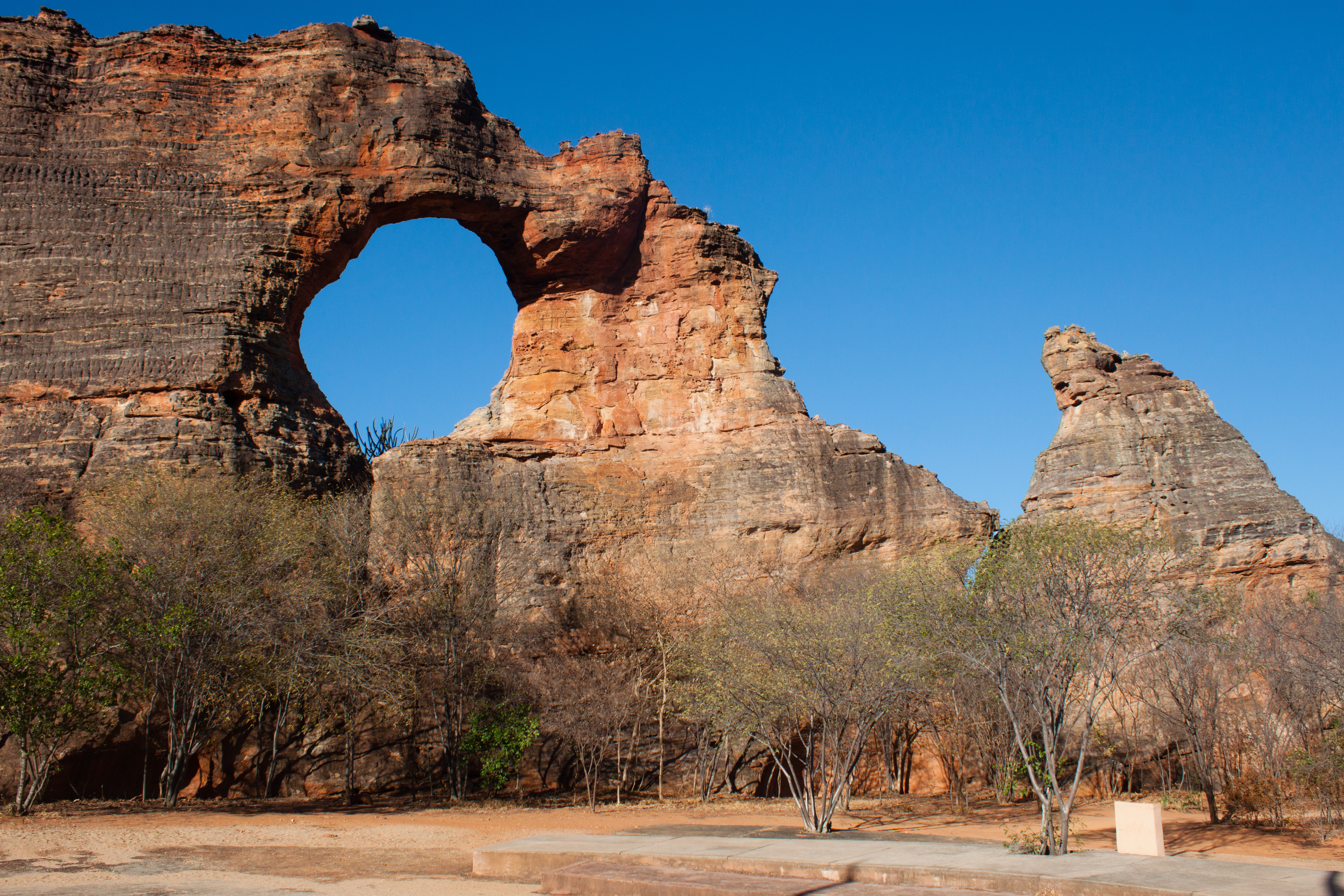
Pedra Furada

The park was created to protect the prehistoric artifacts and paintings found there. It became a World Heritage Site in 1991. Its head archaeologist was Niède Guidon. Its best known archaeological site is Pedra Furada.

Scientific studies confirm that the Capivara mountain range was densely populated in the pre-Columbian Era. A newer site is Toca da Tira Peia, where the stone tools found may date to as early as 22,000 years ago. The site has been dated through optically stimulated luminescence.

Other important archaeological sites in the area are Toca da Pena, Baxao da Esperanca, and Sitio do Meio. Lapa do Boquete site is located directly south.

== Wildlife ==
Bearded capuchins in the park have been found to have the "largest known tool kit for wild capuchin monkeys". Their stone tools include those for foraging, threat, and sexual displays, while they use sticks as tools for probing. Further, while on the ground, they dig with their hands after loosening the soil with stone tools for roots and arthropods.

== Sítio do Meio ==
Sítio do Meio is the second most important rock shelter in the area after Pedra Furada. It features fully Pleistocene dates and artefacts. The stone artefacts are better preserved because of the absence of waterfalls. At least 98 stone tools seem older than 12,500 BP. They belong to the Upper Pleistocenic phase of Pedra Furada 3.

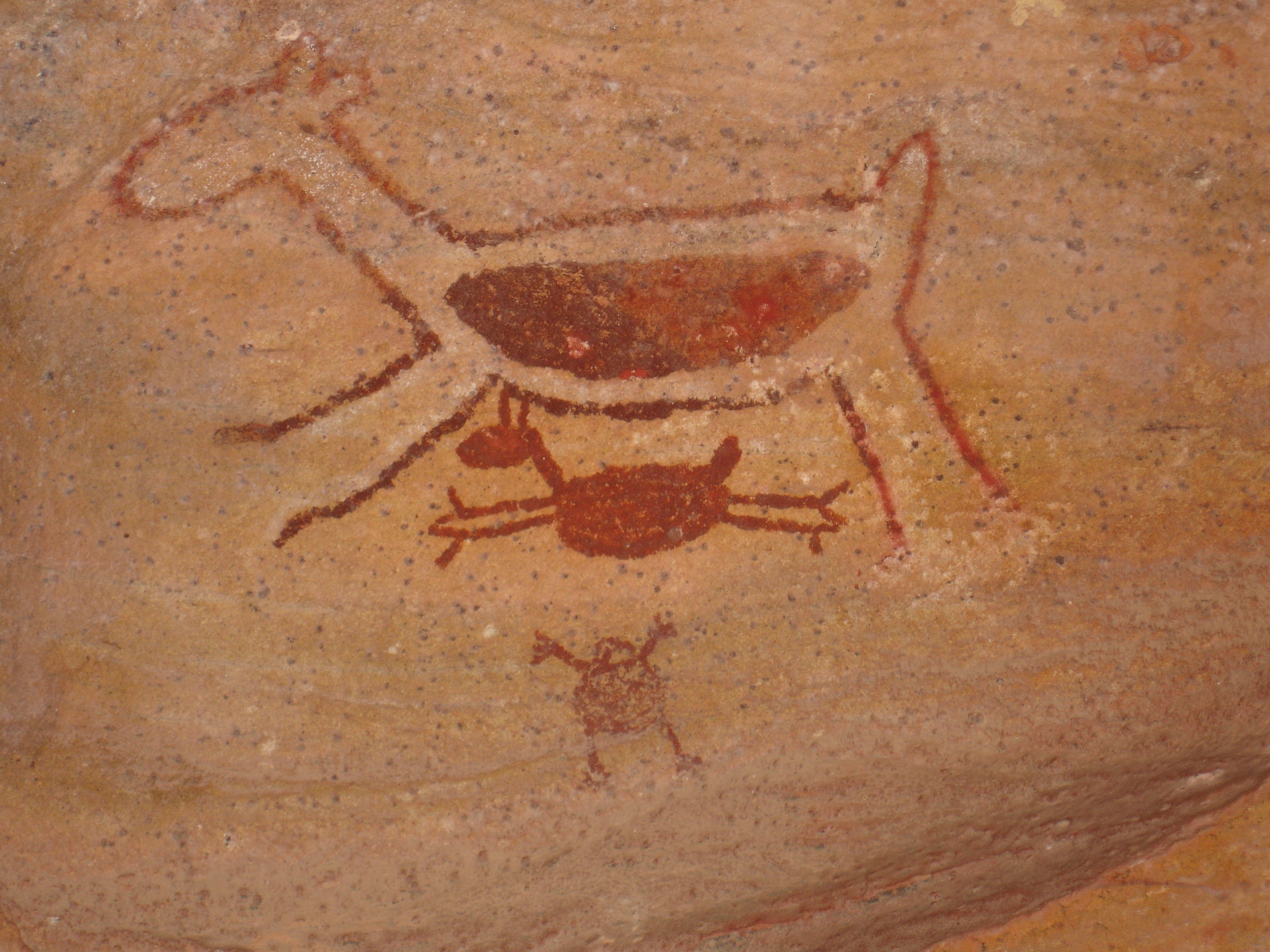

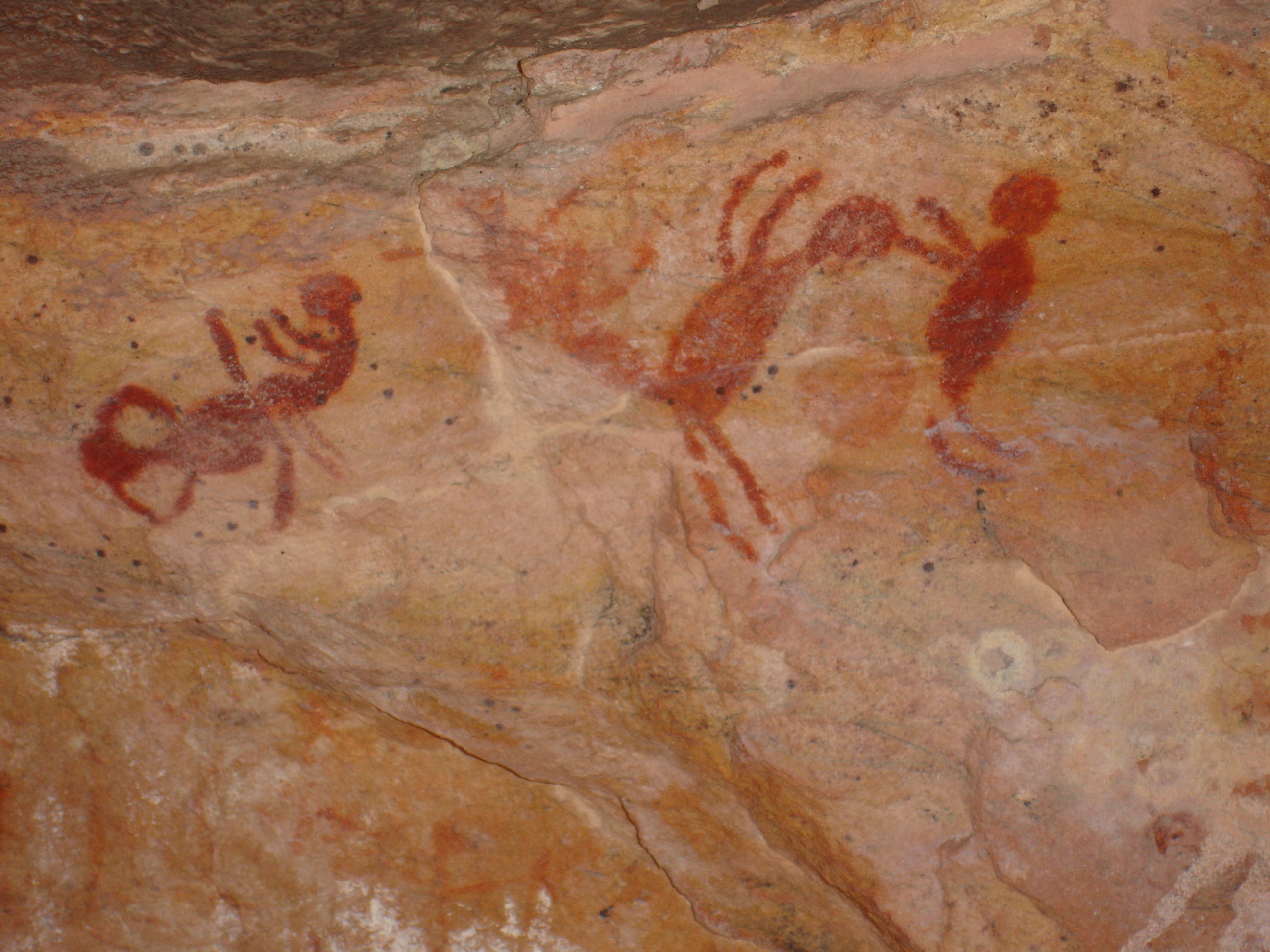

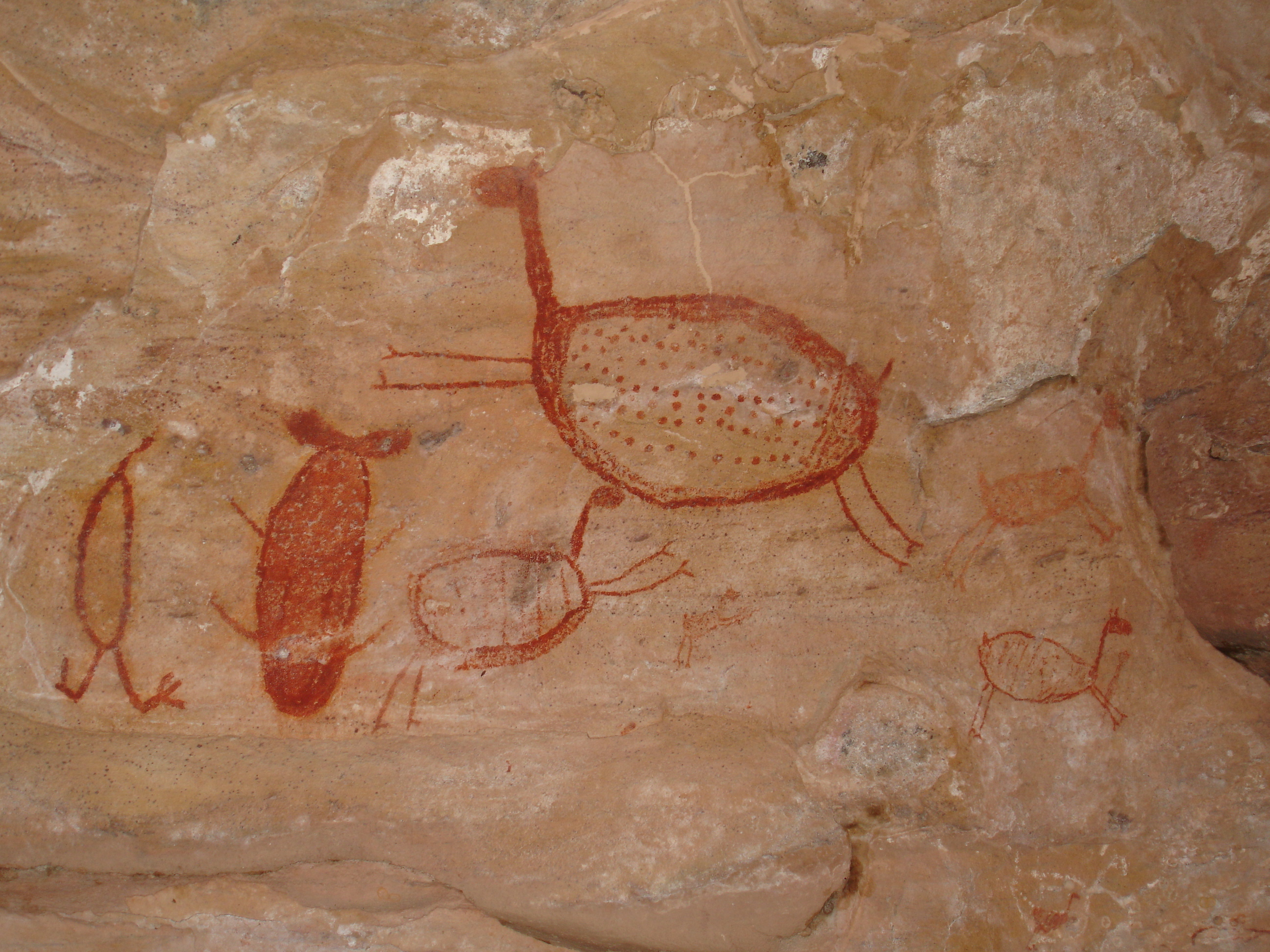

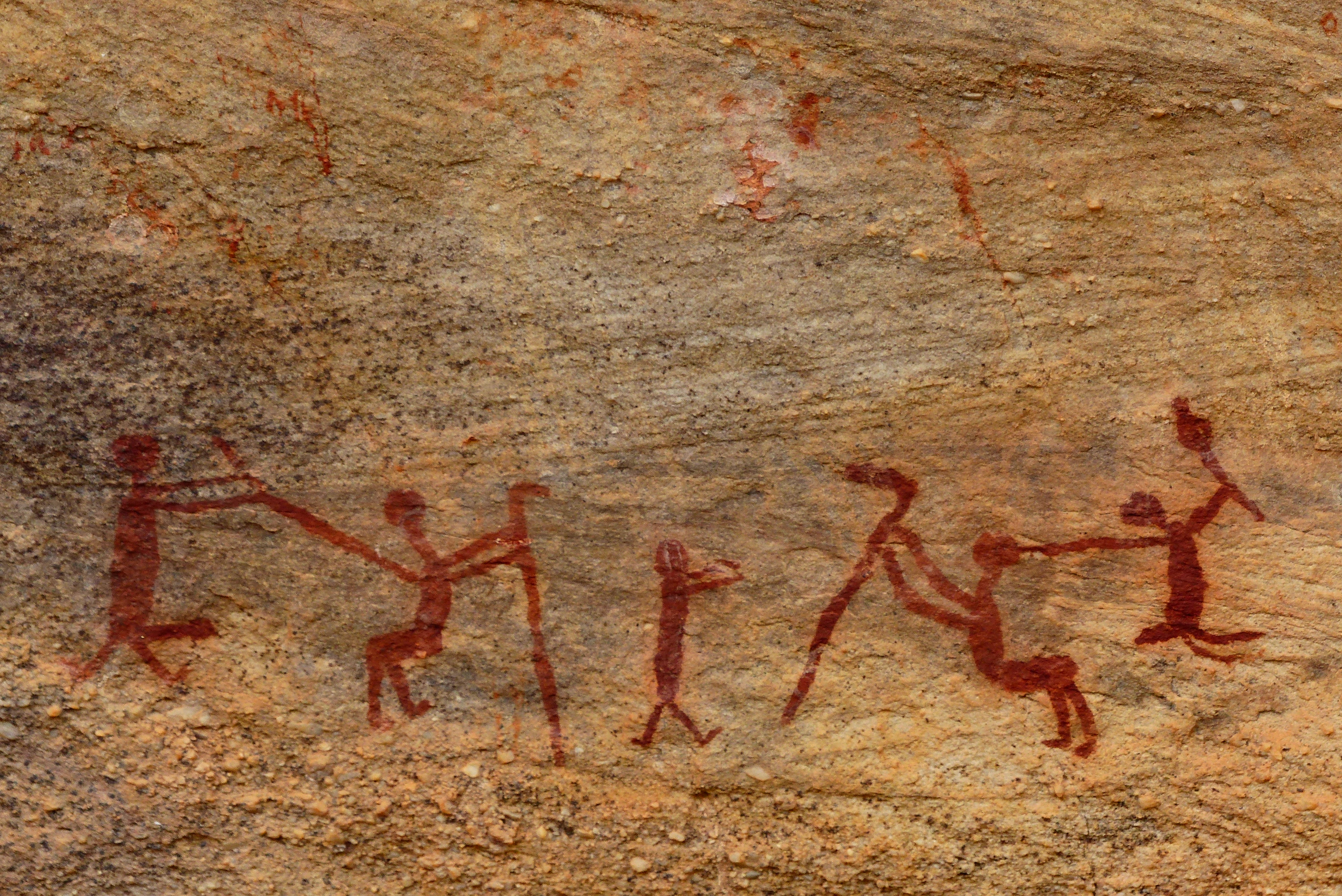

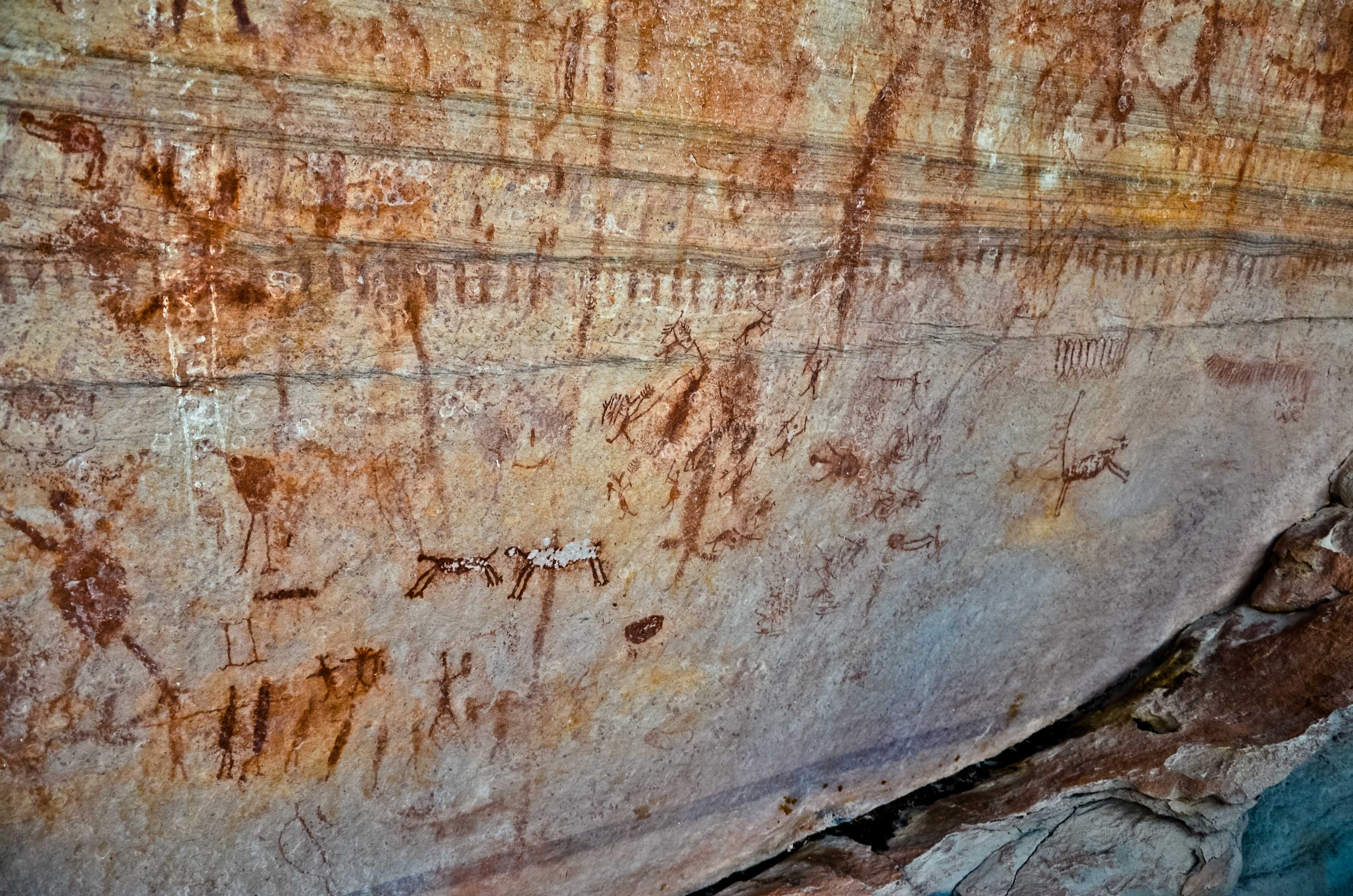

== See also ==
- Niède Guidon
- Cavernas do Peruaçu Environmental Protection Area
- Museum of Archeology and Ethnology of the University of São Paulo
- Museum of the American Man

== Bibliography ==
- Eric Boëda, et al. (2014), Les Industries pléistocènes du Piaui. Nouvelles données academia.edu
