= Andreatta =

Andreatta is an Italian surname. Notable people with the surname include:

- Beniamino Andreatta (1928–2007), Italian economist and politician
- Margarida Davina Andreatta (1922–2015), Brazilian archaeologist
- Melissa Andreatta, Australian football coach
