= Museum of Archeology and Ethnology of the University of São Paulo =

Department of the University of São Paulo

Museum of Archaeology and Ethnology of the University of São Paulo
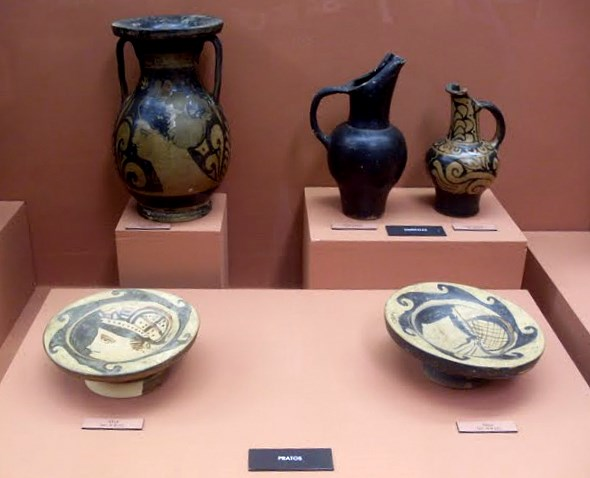
- Type: Archeology, Ethnology, African Art
- Inauguration: 1989
- Director: Paulo Antonio Dantas de Blasis
- Website: http://www.mae.usp.br/
- Country: Brazil
- City: São Paulo
- Coordinates: 23°33′33″S 46°44′29″W

The Museum of Archeology and Ethnology of the University of São Paulo (MAE-USP) is a department of the University of São Paulo. Focused on research, teaching, and cultural and scientific diffusion. It was created in 1989, from the dismemberment of the archeology and ethnology sectors of the Museu Paulista, to which the collections of the Institute of Prehistory of USP (the former museum of the same name of the Faculty of Philosophy, Languages and Human Sciences (FFLCH)) and the Plínio Ayrosa Collection were merged. It is located in Cidade Universitária (campus), in the West Zone of São Paulo.

The museum has one of the largest collections of archeological and ethnographic artifacts in Brazil, consisting of more than one hundred and fifty thousand (150,000) pieces, formed through field collections, excavations, purchases, exchanges, loans, and donations since the end of the 19th century. The archeological collection covers civilizations from the Mediterranean and the Middle East, pre-Columbian America, and especially pre-colonial Brazil. The ethnographic collection includes pieces related to African and Afro-Brazilian populations and indigenous peoples from all regions of Brazil. It also has a vast library, with about 60,000 volumes, including books, catalogs, doctoral theses, periodicals, and rare works.

MAE offers extension courses and optional subjects for undergraduate students. At the graduate level, it maintains the archeology Program for undergraduates in general, training professionals in the areas of prehistoric and historic archeology and classical archeology. It promotes exhibitions and educational programs aimed at the community in general. The research is developed in the form of office, field and laboratory activities, in partnership with several Brazilian and foreign institutions. It maintains the Mário Neme Regional Center for Archeological Research, in the city of Piraju, and the Iguape Regional Museum, in Vale do Ribeira, as logistic and operational support centers for field research. It also has links with the Centro de Arqueologia Biomas da Amazônia, in the municipality of Iranduba, in conjunction with the State University of Amazonas. Between 1991 and 2011, it regularly published the Revista do Museu de Arqueologia e Etnologia, in print and with annual periodicity, but since 2012, the journal became biannual, in electronic format and with open access through the Journal Portal of USP.

== History ==
=== The Archeological and Ethnographic Collections of the Paulista Museum ===
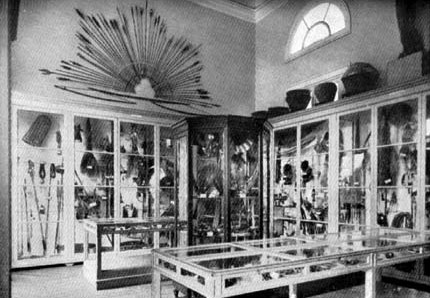
Image of an exhibition room with Indian artifacts at the Paulista Museum, in 1937.

The creation of the collection of the USP's Museum of Archeology and Ethnology is intrinsically related to the historical process of development of the archeology and ethnology sectors of the Paulista Museum, since MAE is the direct heir of these collections. Some of the oldest and rarest objects in MAE's collection come from the Museu Paulista. Already in the initial collection of the Paulista Museum, composed of objects from the vast and eclectic private collection gathered in the mid-nineteenth century by merchant Joaquim Sertório, to which was added the collection of the extinct Provincial da Associação Auxiliadora do Progresso da Província de São Paulo museum (founded in 1877), there were ethnographic and archaeological pieces, besides other objects of various natures, such as historical, zoological, and botanical items. The museum followed the model of an encyclopedic museum, with a naturalistic stamp typical of museology institutions of the 19th century, and reflecting the character of a cabinet of curiosities of the referred Sertório collection.

Housed in the Ipiranga Palace, the Paulista Museum has shown interest in archaeological and ethnographic research since its inauguration in 1895, as evidenced by the first volume of the Revista do Museu Paulista, of the same year, which features an article signed by Hermann von Ihering, the museum's first director, entitled "A civilização pré-histórica do Brasil meridional" (in English "The prehistoric civilization of southern Brazil"), discussing ethnographic aspects of the indigenous populations of southern Brazil. Throughout Ihering's tenure, the museum would considerably expand its archeology and zoology collections, mainly through exchanges with similar institutions.

After Ihering's departure, however, the museum began to give in to the international trend of specialization of encyclopedic museums, gradually abandoning the profile of a natural history museum: in 1927, the botany section was transferred to the newly created Biological Institute and, in 1939, the zoological collections were transferred to the custody of the Secretary of Agriculture, which soon after used them as the base collection of the Zoology Museum. The archaeological, ethnographic and historical collections remained at the Ipiranga Palace, giving the Paulista Museum the character of a "memory museum", following the project prepared by Afonso d'Escragnolle Taunay. This new configuration, however, did not harm the museum's scientific activities, since it had been linked to the University of São Paulo since its foundation in 1934, as a Complementary Institute. As of 1963, the museum was permanently incorporated into the university, as an integration entity.

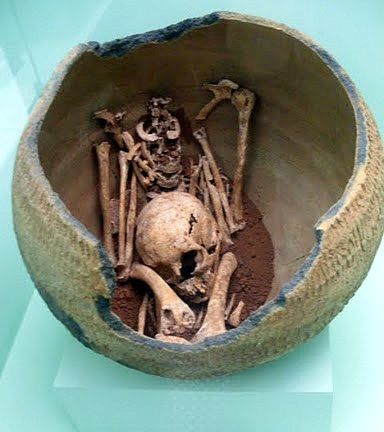
Corrugated funerary urn with human remains. Collection of MAE-USP

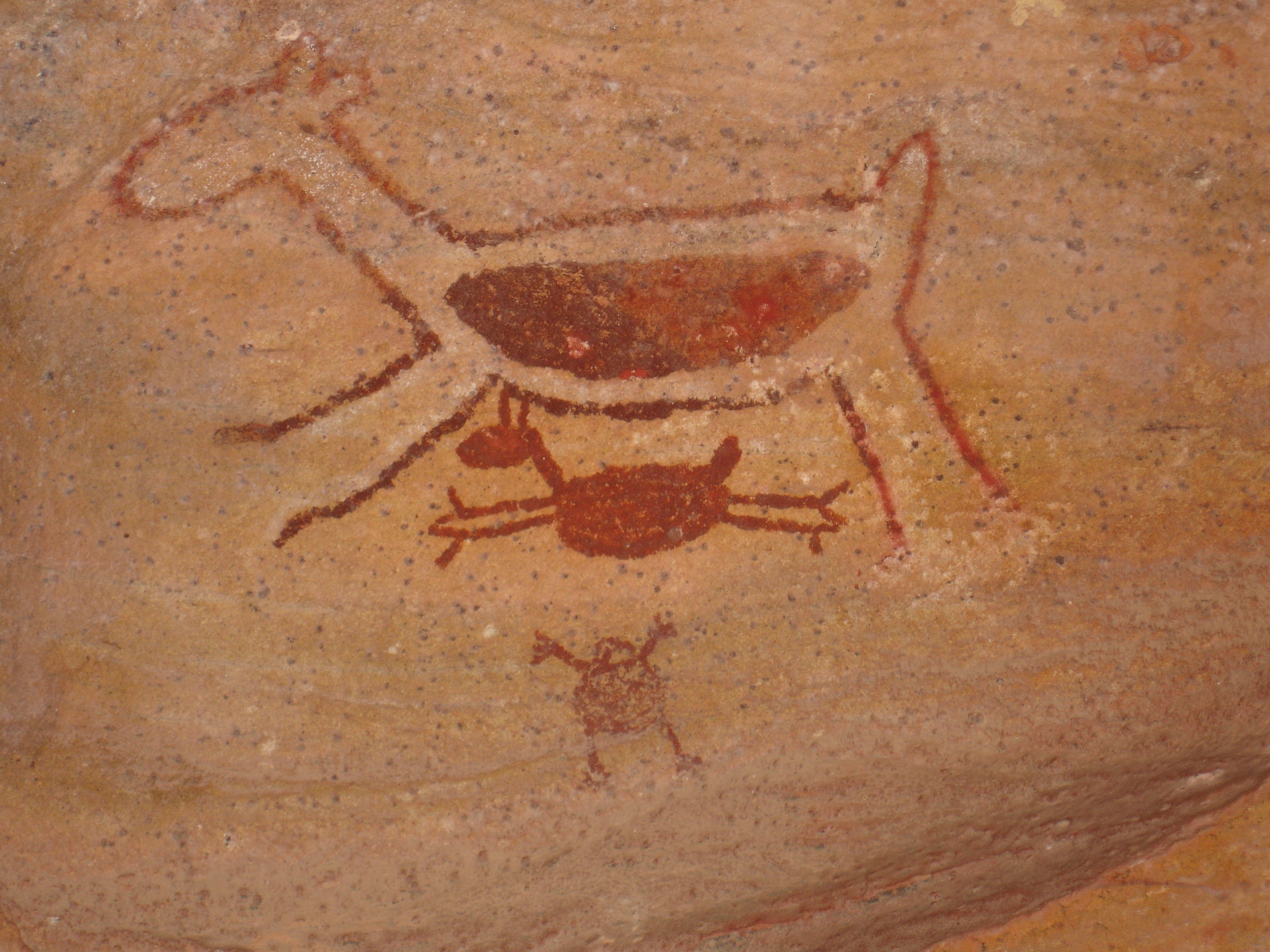
Rock art in the Serra da Capivara National Park

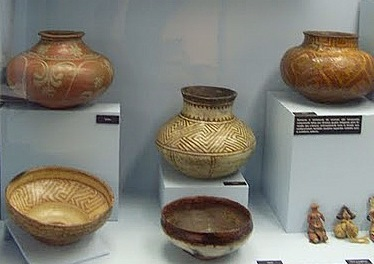
Indigenous ceramics. MAE-USP Collection

Another important phase of changes at the Museu Paulista began in 1946 when the institution was directed by historian Sérgio Buarque de Holanda. The new director created the Ethnology Section, left under the care of Herbert Baldus, one of the precursors of ethnology in Brazil, and began to conduct research in the fields of anthropology and archeology as his main activities. Baldus was charged with initiating the first scientific fieldwork expeditions and the systematic collection of ethnographic artifacts from indigenous populations. These expeditions, in which the researcher Harald Schultz and the Indianist Curt Nimuendaju, among many others, participated, headed to various parts of the Brazilian territory, returning with large batches of objects, including ceramics, textiles, pieces of featherwork, and archaeological artifacts in general. About the fruits of these expeditions, Baldus would comment, in 1953:

I can confirm that the Ethnology Section of the São Paulo Museum, in the seventh year of its existence, no longer looks bad next to the ethnological museums of the Old and the New World. It is true that, in size, it is still a dwarf among giants. But it is approaching the goal for which I have guided it since its creation: to become, within the organism of the Paulista Museum, a sui-generis museum, the "Museum of the Brazilian Indian". Although we are far from having the number of pieces of the Gothenburg Museum or our national museum, we are on the right track to satisfy, as few museums in the world do, the modern scientific demands. Our expeditions have always been organized in the sense of collecting, not so many spectacular pieces, but any object that can contribute to illustrating the material culture of a tribe in its entirety.

In the post-Baldus era, the Paulista Museum sought to maintain the scientific rigor of its research. Beginning in 1968, with the appointment of an archaeologist, the museum began to conduct systematic research at archaeological sites, by the modern scientific conceptions of the time. The archaeological collections were reorganized and dismembered from the Ethnology Section, becoming its own department. From then on, research programs covering different regions of the Brazilian territory multiplied, most of the time in partnership with other institutions. Among others, the Paranapanema Project, coordinated by Luciana Pallestrini, aimed at surveying and analyzing archeological sites along the Paranapanema River in São Paulo, and the Anhanguera Project, under the direction of Margarida Andreatta, which carried out prospects and excavations in the state of Goiás, in cooperation with the Federal University of Goiás, and the Piauí Project, coordinated by Niède Guidon, responsible for a series of research in the Piauí municipality of São Raimundo Nonato, of which archaeological findings would culminate in the creation of the Serra da Capivara National Park, a UNESCO World Heritage Site since 1991.

In addition to the pieces gathered in excavations, collections, scientific expeditions, and donations, occasional purchases from private collections would contribute to the quantitative and qualitative expansion of the archaeological collection of the Paulista Museum. This is the case of the highly relevant collection of Tapajonic archeological ceramics, acquired in 1971 with funds provided by the São Paulo Research Foundation. It is a collection of more than 8,000 ceramic pieces, statuettes and lithic objects, formed from the aggregation of two private collections, belonging to Ubirajara Bentes and José da Costa Pereira, collected over more than twenty years in an area extending from Santarém to the Xingu River.

=== The Plínio Ayrosa collection ===
A second important set of objects preserved today in the Museum of Archeology and Ethnology has its origin in the extinct Ethnography Museum, founded in 1935 by Professor Plínio Ayrosa, regent of the Chair of Ethnography and Tupi-Guarani Languages of the Faculty of Philosophy, Languages and Human Sciences, University of São Paulo. The Ethnography Museum's collection began to be formed in the 1930s, through collections and donations. A considerable part of this collection, in turn, originates from the collections of the Ethnographic and Social Documentation Center of the Institute of Education of USP, highlighting the Ramkokamekra-Canela Collection. This precious collection, consisting of 391 objects, was formed by Curt Nimuendajú and donated by him to the Ethnographic and Social Documentation Center in 1936. With the extinction of the center in 1938, all the collections were transferred to the Museum of Ethnography.

From the 1970s on, in line with the greater development of ethnology in Brazil, the collection of the Ethnography Museum registered an expressive growth, reaching 4,000 pieces at the time of its incorporation into the MAE. Due to this historical conjecture, most of the objects coming from the Ethnography Museum are composed of relatively recent materials collected by researchers from the Anthropology Department of USP and other institutions. There is, however, little historical documentation about the Ethnography Museum and many of the documents are contrasting among themselves, starting with the name of the institution, sometimes called "Museum of Ethnology". The University of São Paulo's internal records refer to the collection, since at least 1975, under the name "Acervo Plínio Ayrosa." The Museum of Ethnography, however, has not been named "Acervo Plínio Ayrosa".

=== The Institute of Prehistory ===
The Institute of Prehistory (IPH) was established in 1952 by the intellectual Paulo Duarte, after his return to Brazil at the end of the Estado Novo. Initially called the Commission of Prehistory, the institute was at first linked to the Congress. Inspired by the Parisian institution of the same name, and with the support of Paul Rivet, then director of the Musée de l'Homme, the IPH was one of the main responsible for the development of Brazilian academic archeology, in addition to conducting numerous excavations and scientific research in various parts of the national territory.

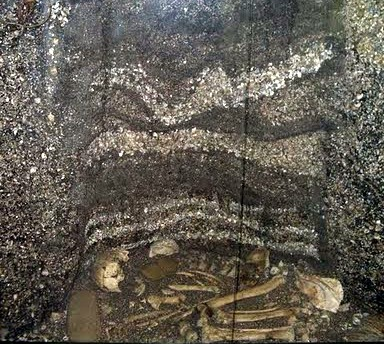
Midden with human remains. MAE-USP Collection

Among its most important achievements was the discovery, in a midden on Santo Amaro Island, of the oldest human remains so far known in South America, the "Man of Maratu", about eight thousand years old, measured by carbon-14. Professionals such as Joseph Emperaire and Annette Laming-Emperaire, responsible for forming a considerable portion of the first academic archaeologists in Brazil, worked at the institute.

The Institute of Prehistory was established as one of the centers for the diffusion of the so-called "French school" of archeology, whose meticulous fieldwork methodology would clash shortly afterward with the generalist practice of the "North American school", adopted by the military regime, funded by the United States and put into practice by the National Program of Archeological Research (PRONAPA). In 1962, the institute was incorporated into the University of São Paulo. Paulo Duarte remained in its direction until 1969. His critical stance towards PRONAPA's scientific methodology, which he classified as superficial and dehumanized, and, above all, his outright opposition to the military regime and the equipping of the University of São Paulo by the repressive state apparatus led to his dismissal from USP shortly after the promulgation of AI-5. His dismissal was followed by an unsuccessful attempt to extinguish the Institute of Prehistory, incorporating it into the former Museum of Archeology and Ethnology.

=== The former Museum of Archeology and Ethnology ===
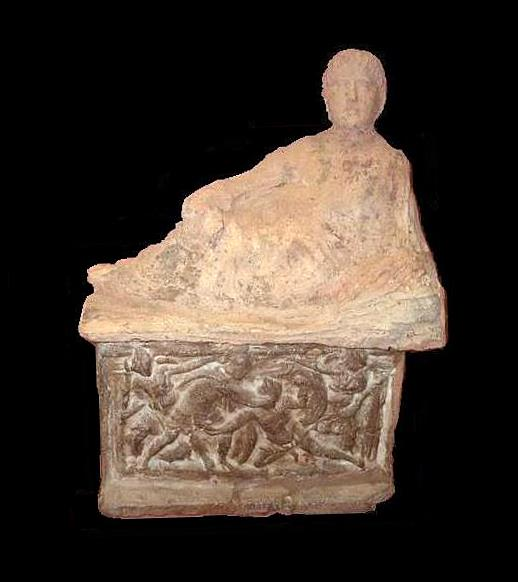
Lid from an Etruscan funerary urn. Collection of MAE-USP.

In 1963, the Museum of Art and Archeology of the University of São Paulo was founded, renamed Museum of Archeology e Ethnology after the university reform of 1970. The museum had been created to house the archaeological collections related to those of the Mediterranean and Middle Eastern civilizations belonging to the university. It functioned for many years, although always on a provisional basis, in the building of the Department of History and Geography, and was later transferred to the 5th floor of one of the buildings of the Residential Complex of the University of São Paulo. The museum was located on the 5th floor of the University of São Paulo's Residential Complex.

A significant part of the former MAE's collection consisted of pieces acquired through donations and exchanges, among which stands out the donation of 536 Mediterranean and Middle Eastern archeological artifacts made by Italian museums to the University of São Paulo in 1964. [3] Other pieces were donated by Ciccillo Matarazzo, on the same occasion when he donated to USP the collection of artworks that belonged to the Museum of Modern Art (the base collection of USP's Museum of Contemporary Art), by Vera Maluf, Edgardo Pires Ferreira, Ciro Flamarion Santana Cardoso, Oscar Landmann, among others.

Most of the collection, however, was acquired with aid from the São Paulo State Research Support Foundation, aiming to consolidate a scientific research center in Mediterranean and Middle Eastern archeology. This is the case of the Egyptian collection belonging to Vera Bezzi Guida, disputed by the MAE and the British Museum, purchased by USP in 1976. In addition to artifacts from classical and Middle Eastern archeology, the museum was dedicated to collecting African and pre-Columbian pieces.

=== The present Museum of Archeology and Ethnology ===
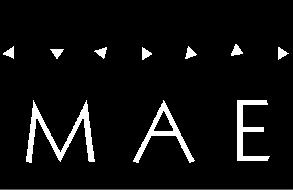
Logo of the current Museum of archeology and Ethnology.

The present Archeology and Ethnology Museum of the University of São Paulo was officially constituted on August 12, 1989, by means of resolution number 3560, issued during the rectorship of José Goldemberg. The measure was taken after the presentation of a report prepared by a commission chaired by Professor José Jobson de Andrade Arruda, about the concept of scientific curatorship and its organizing function in a university museum. The creation of the new MAE consisted, effectively, in the incorporation of the anthropological collections dispersed in integration organs and teaching units in a new scientific-cultural center. The Institute of Pre-History, the former Museum of Archeology and Ethnology (whose name the new institution kept), the archeology and ethnology sectors of the Paulista Museum (which became exclusively active in the field of history, according to the profile outlined by Taunay in the first half of the 20th century, and the Plínio Ayrosa Collection (APA) were merged. The process consisted not only in the merging of the museological and bibliographical collections of these institutions, but also of their teaching and technical-administrative bodies.

Thus, although relatively recent, the museum has already emerged as the holder of a broad heritage, consisting of more than 120,000 pieces, constituting one of the most important centers for the preservation of archeological and ethnographic memory in Brazil. As a university museum, MAE was structured to meet the fundamental pillars of academic life, i.e., research, teaching, and extension. In the field of research, the museum currently concentrates the largest group of archeology researchers in the country, mainly dedicated to Brazilian archeology, responsible for projects in different regions of the national territory, in partnership with other institutions. Teaching includes undergraduate elective courses, university extension courses and the oldest graduate course in archeology in the country, as well as the largest number of masters and doctoral students in the area.

The cultural diffusion sector is responsible for conducting applied research in the area of museology and education, for the elaboration of short and long-term exhibitions and traveling exhibitions based at the museum itself, as well as for the policy of lending pieces from the collection to other institutions. MAE's works have already been exhibited at several institutions in São Paulo, such as Maria Antônia University Center, Estação Ciência (Science Station), Itaú Cultural, Centro Cultural São Paulo, and Conjunto Nacional, among others. MAE was responsible for the scientific curatorship of the Brazilian archeology and Afro-Brazilian art modules of the Rediscovery Exhibition, organized to celebrate the 500 years of Brazil's discovery and hosted in several Brazilian capitals and other countries. Pieces from the museum also integrated the exhibition Brazil, The African Heritage hosted at the Dapper Museum in Paris. Between 2001 and 2002, the MAE organized, for the first time outside São Paulo, an exclusive exhibition of pieces from its collection, hosted in Brasilia, at the Superior Court of Justice, entitled Brasil 50 mil anos.

=== Installations ===
Since 1993, the MAE has been housed in a building of approximately 4,000 square meters, next to the City Hall of the Armando Salles de Oliveira University Campus, located in the West Zone of São Paulo's capital. The place, previously belonging to BID-Fundusp, was renovated and enlarged to receive the museum during Roberto Lobo's management, The space is equipped with conservation and restoration, research and photography laboratories, an archive, a library, areas for educational-cultural activities, exhibition spaces, and technical reserve. It is, however, considered insufficient for the museum's needs. Due to the lack of physical space, only 1% of the entire collection is on permanent display.

In 1999, the University of São Paulo presented a project to build a 120,000-square-meter architectural complex by architect Paulo Mendes da Rocha, known as "Praça dos Museus", to which the MAE, the Zoology Museum, and the Science Museum would be transferred, but this did not happen.

In 2010, the project was resumed, based on a compensation agreement for the damage to an archaeological site in Itaim Bibi between the Public Prosecutor's Office, the USP, IPHAN, and the responsible developers. Thus, the future "Museum Park" is being built in Cidade Universitária, with 53 thousand m², including only the MAE and the Zoology Museum, with completion scheduled for 2015.

== Collection ==
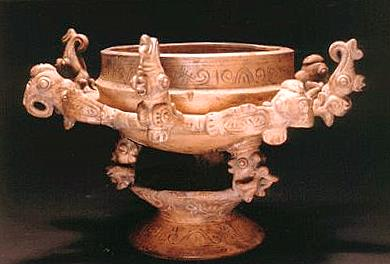
Caryatid vase from the Santarém culture (Tapajó people ceramics).

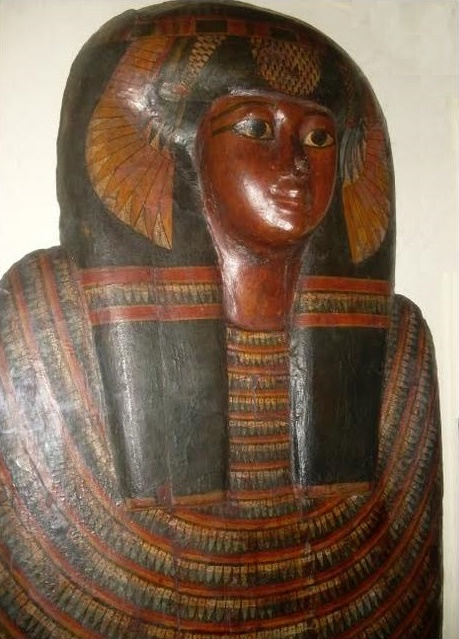
Egyptian sarcophagus lid. Collection of MAE-USP.

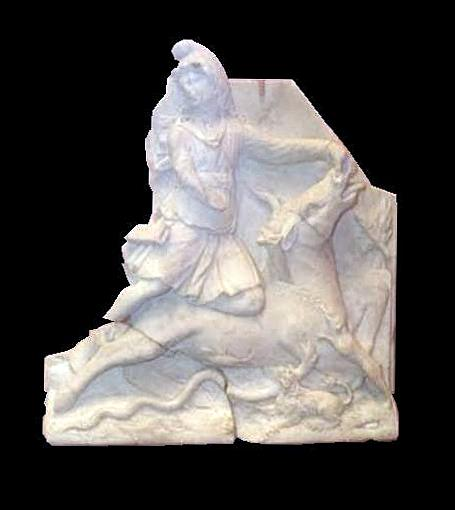
Cultural piece of Mithra in marble. Roman art, 1st century AD.

The USP's Museum of Archeology and Ethnology collection is composed of more than 150,000 pieces, from excavations carried out in Brazilian archeological sites, from collections made by ethnologists since the end of the 19th century, as well as from purchases, exchanges, loans, and donations. The collection includes archaeological artifacts (ceramics, lithics and bone, human and animal) related to the civilizations of the Mediterranean, the Middle East, pre-Columbian America, and especially pre-colonial Brazil. The ethnographic collection consists of objects relating to African, Afro-Brazilian, and indigenous populations of Brazil.

=== Brazilian archeology ===
MAE has one of the largest collections of archeological artifacts in Brazil, and is particularly rich in terms of the archeological heritage of the state of São Paulo and Amazonian archeology. The collection is composed of more than 50 scientific collections, and is constantly being added to, as new pieces are incorporated into it as new research is started. It addresses issues such as the human occupation of Americas and Brazil, the bases of cultural diversification (fishermen, hunter gatherer groups), the social organization and material culture of native peoples.

The oldest traces of human presence in Brazilian territory documented in the collection date back at least 10,000 years. They are artifacts made of lithic material (sandstone, flint, granite, basalt, etc.), attesting to man's biological and cultural evolution, from chipped stone projectile tips to polished axe blades. As far as the territory of São Paulo is concerned, the records of the mastery of the technology of working lithic material date back up to 5,000 years, in the case of chipped stone, and up to 1,000 years, in the case of polished stone. Other more elaborate lithic artifacts include mortar and pestles, anthropomorphic figurines (notably the "Idol of Iguape"), Zeoliths resembling fish, birds, mammals, and other animals, lithic ornaments (tembetás, pendant plates, ovoid stones perforated into necklaces, etc.), and muiraquitãs produced on greenish mineral supports (nephrite, amazonite, steatite soapstone). Although the specimens come from all over the national territory, it is possible to observe the concentration of certain typologies in certain regions, such as the zooliths, mostly from southern Brazil, and the polished axe blades, found mainly in the North and Midwest.

In the archaeological ceramics collections, the significant nucleus of Amazonian artifacts stands out. The collection of Marajoara ceramics includes funerary urns, anthropomorphic figurines, vases, bowls, plates, cups, rattles, thongs, among other objects. The oldest examples are dated to around 700 AD. The collection of Tapajonic ceramics is composed of more than 8,000 pieces, among which are anthropomorphic figurines, ornithomorphic vases, zoomorphic figures, fragments, etc. Also represented in the collection are the Conduri and Guarita traditions, also in the Amazon region, the Tupi, Uru and Aratu traditions, in central Brazil, the Itararé tradition, in southern Brazil, and other ceramic artifacts of unknown provenance. As far as the territory of the state of São Paulo is concerned, there are collections of ceramics from archeological sites in Iguape, Itapeva, Itaberá (José Fernandes site) and Santa Bárbara d'Oeste (Caiuby site), among other locations, dating back to over 1,000 years ago.

The museum also preserves artifacts from the bone industry, mainly tips and awls, produced from animal bones and teeth. Most are from middens, since the unfavorable conditions of the Brazilian tropical climate and the acidity of the soil hinder their preservation in other conditions.

=== American archeology ===
The American archeology collection of the Museum of Archeology and Ethnology is mostly composed by artifacts from civilizations that lived in South America in the pre-Columbian period. Among others, the Max Uhle collection, highly representative of the Inca cultures, acquired by the Paulista Museum in the beginning of the 20th century, the Oscar Landmann collection, formed by Andean fabrics and fragments donated by Landmann to the former Museum of Art and Archeology, and the Gilbert C. Y. Asmar collection stand out.

Several civilizations from pre-Hispanic Peru are represented in the collection, such as the Chimor, the Incas, the Mochicas, the Nazcas, the Chancay, and the Waris, among others. To a lesser extent, the Arica culture from Chile and unidentified civilizations from Argentina and the Andean countries are represented.

The ceramics collection includes vases, pots, bowls, aríbals, and statuettes, with decorations of anthropomorphic and zoomorphic motifs, etc. The museum also holds a large collection of textiles, consisting of bags, slings, fragments and strips of cloth in general, using mainly cotton as material. There are also artifacts made of wood (instruments, plates), copper (bracelets, weights, macanas), silver (spindles, plates, tongs, cylinders, fasteners, rings), stone, and bone.

=== Mediterranean and Middle Eastern archeology ===
MAE has an important collection of archeological artifacts produced by cultures that developed around the Mediterranean Sea and the Middle East, covering categories as subsistence, economic organization, technology related to the elaboration of artifacts, religion and funerary rites, daily life, and material production in general. Civilizations such as the Egyptian, Greek, Etruscan, Roman, Mesopotamian are represented. It is one of the most significant collections of this nature in Latin America.

The Egyptian archeology collection was formed by acquisitions made by the University of São Paulo with the support of FAPESP and by donations. A highlight is the collection of 36 objects that belonged to Vera Bezzi Guida, acquired in 1976, composed mainly by shabtis, one in wood covered with black resin, probably from the tomb of the pharaoh Seti I, besides amulets, bronze statuettes of deities and a canopic jar with a lid in the shape of a human head. Another important group is composed of 27 objects that belonged to Hermann Tapajós Hipp, including scarabs, amulets, ushabtis, and an important embossed fragment with a female face, representing Princess Meketaton, one of the daughters of Pharaoh Akhenaten, from the royal tomb of Amarna. In the Vera Maluf collection, a cartonnage mask and a mummified falcon from the Roman Period stand out. The Egyptian collection of the Paulista Museum consists of approximately 50 objects such as amulets, ushabtis, faience, bronze statuettes representing animals and terracota. Also noteworthy is a polychrome wooden skiff lid from the XXII Dynasty.

From the Mesopotamian cultures (Sumer, Akkadian, Assyrian, and Babylonian) the museum preserves a set of clay and stone tablets with cuneiform writing, the oldest dating from the IV millennium and the most recent from the I millennium B.C., as well as seals and cylinder seals, used in palace administration and in the Mesopotamian documentary record.

The Greco-Roman collection is composed of lithic artifacts, ceramics, metal objects, coins, terracotta statuary, marble, and other materials. The vast collection of Greek, Italic, Etruscan, Campanian, Carthaginian, and Roman ceramics, of great artistic and documentary value, stands out. The collection of terracotta statuettes includes several specimens from Tangier and other pieces from the Greek colonies in Italy and Sicily, with an outstanding piece from the 6th century B.C., from Selinunte. The collection of bronze artifacts (vessels, weapons, armor, etc.) includes pieces from Archaic Greece and other Roman pieces. Also noteworthy are the collections of ancient glassware and isolated specimens of large statuary.

== Admission ==
Admission is free for all visitors to the Museum, which is open Tuesday through Friday from 10 a.m. to noon and 1:30 to 5 pm, and Saturdays, Sundays, and holidays from 10 a.m. to 4 pm.

== Bibliography ==
- Bakos, Margaret Marchiori (2004). Egiptomania. o Egito no Brasil.. São Paulo: Contexto. p. 441–443. ISBN 8572442618
- Comissão do Patrimônio Cultural da USP (2000). Guia de Museus Brasileiros. São Paulo: Edusp. p. 441–443
- Dorta, Sonia Ferraro & Cury, Marília Xavier (2000). A plumária indígena brasileira no Museu de Arqueologia e Etnologia da USP. USPIANA – Brasil 500 anos. São Paulo: Edusp. ISBN 8531405610
- Gomes, Denise Maria Cavalcante. Cerâmica arqueológica da Amazônia: Vasilhas da Coleção Tapajônica MAE-USP. In: Revista de Antropologia, São Paulo, Edusp, 2002, v. 45 nº 2
- Funari, Pedro Paulo A. (2003). Arqueologia. São Paulo: Contexto. ISBN 8572442510
- Paiva, Orlando Marques de (ed.) (1984). O Museu Paulista da Universidade de São Paulo. Brazilian Museums Series. São Paulo: Safra Bank. CDD 981.0074
- Santos, Maria Cecília Loschiavo dos (1998). USP, Universidade de São Paulo. alma mater paulista, 63 anos. São Paulo: Edusp. ISBN 8531404185
