= Marajoara culture =

Indigenous Amazon-river society

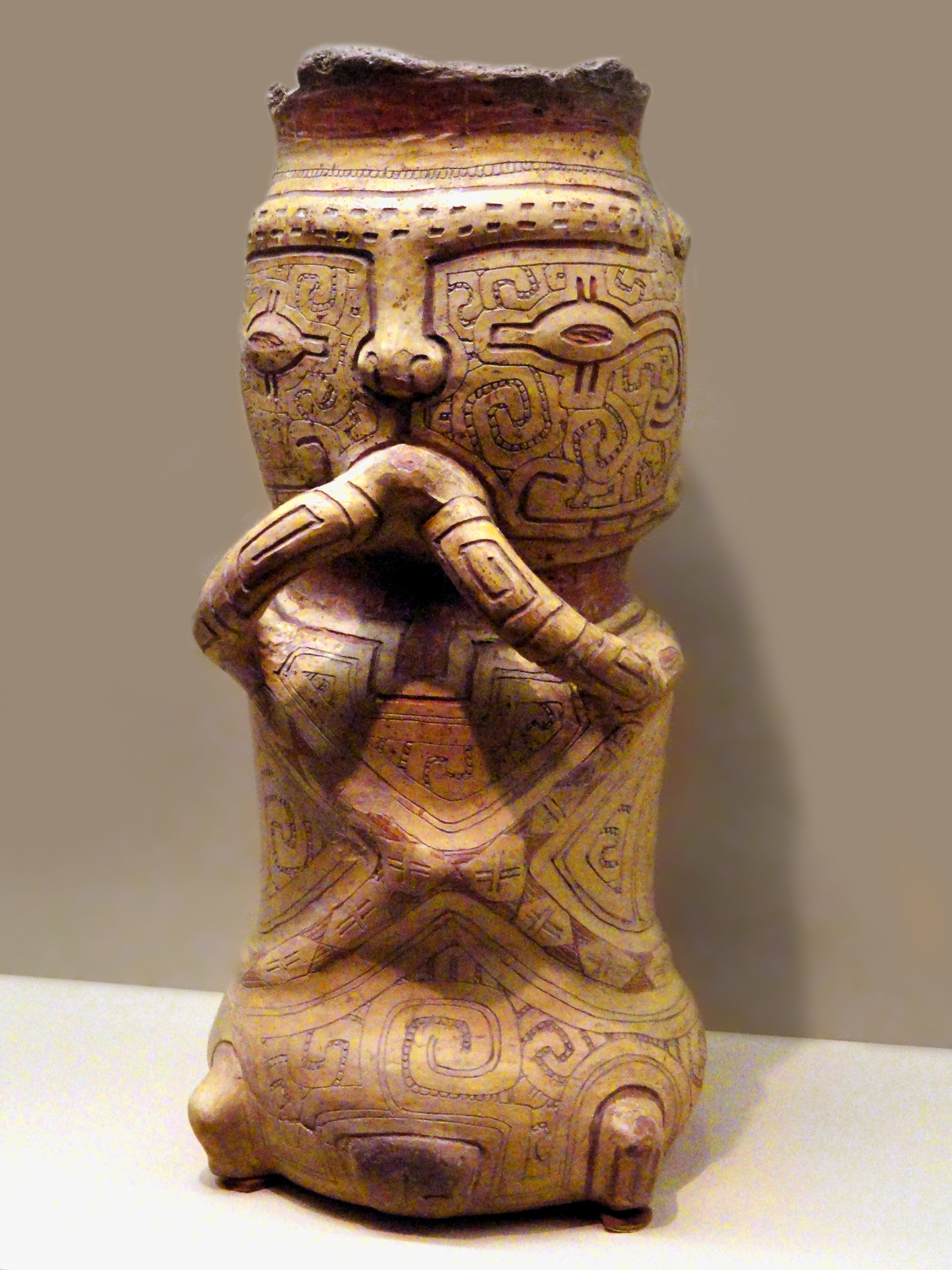
Burial urn, American Museum of Natural History

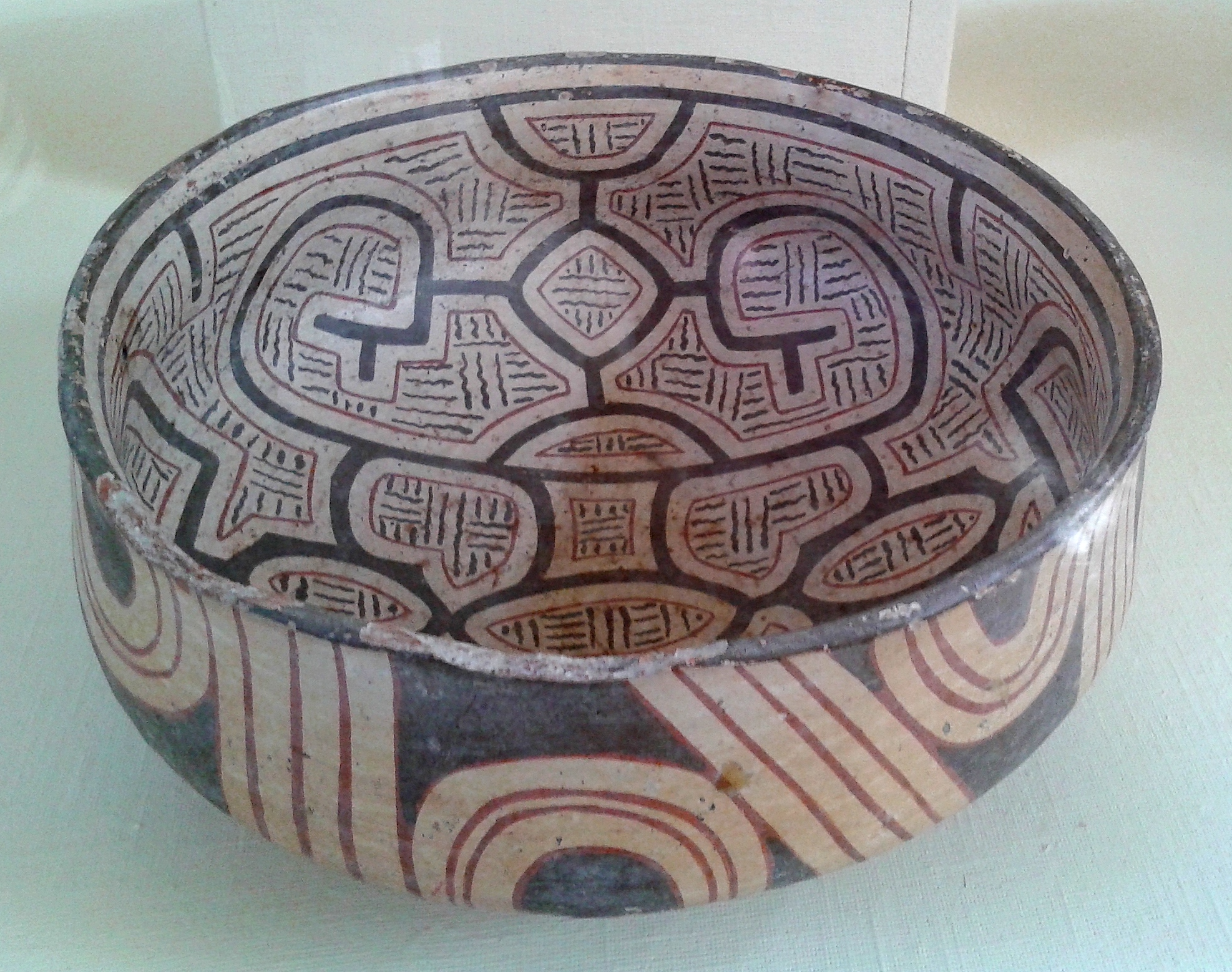
Marajoara bowl, Museu Nacional

The Marajoara or Marajó culture was an ancient pre-Cabraline era culture that flourished on Marajó island at the mouth of the Amazon River in northern Brazil. In a survey, Charles C. Mann suggests the culture appeared to flourish between 800 AD and 1400 AD, based on archeological studies. Researchers have documented that there was human activity at these sites as early as 1000 BC. The culture seems to have persisted into the colonial era.

== Background ==
Archeologists have found sophisticated pottery in their excavations on the island. These pieces are large, and elaborately painted and incised with representations of plants and animals. These provided the first evidence that a complex society had existed on Marajó. Evidence of mound building further suggests that well-populated, complex and sophisticated settlements developed on this island, as only such settlements were believed capable of such extended projects as major earthworks.

The extent, level of complexity, and resource interactions of the Marajoara culture have been disputed. Working in the 1950s in some of her earliest research, American Betty Meggers suggested that the society migrated from the Andes and settled on the island.

In the 1980s, another American archeologist, Anna Curtenius Roosevelt, led excavations and geophysical surveys of the mound Teso dos Bichos. She concluded that the society that constructed the mounds originated on the island itself.

The pre-Cabraline culture of Marajó may have developed social stratification and supported a population as large as 100,000 people. The Native Americans of the Amazon rain forest may have used their method of developing and working in terra preta to make the land suitable for the large-scale agriculture needed to support large populations and complex social formations such as chiefdoms.

=== Origin of the mounds ===
Conclusive proof of this ancient human presence in the Amazon is the Pedra Pintada cave, located near the city of Monte Alegre, in Pará (Brazil), which was studied by the American archaeologist Anna Roosvelt.

In the cave area you can admire several cave paintings that represent anthropomorphic and zoomorphic figures, as well as representations of the sun, which was worshiped as a god.

Rossetti et al. proposed that the archaeological settlements associated with isolated or compound mounds were "systematically developed on top of extensive elevated surfaces formed due to natural sedimentary processes".

Thus, the large Marajoara mounds or tesos are not entirely manmade. Rather, the inhabitants took advantage of the natural, preexisting elevated surfaces and added on top of those to build their earthworks. This interpretation suggests less cumulative labor investment in the construction of the mounds.

"Several mounds on Marajo Island and several in Bolivia have yielded radiocarbon dates as early as 1000 to 300 BC in early levels, suggesting that the first mounds of the tradition were built in the Formative, the period when horticulture appears to become widespread for the first time."

The earliest phase of human activity and moundbuilding on Marajo Island is known as the 'Ananatuba phase'. The Castanheira site of that phase is an artificial mound.

== Agriculture and economy ==
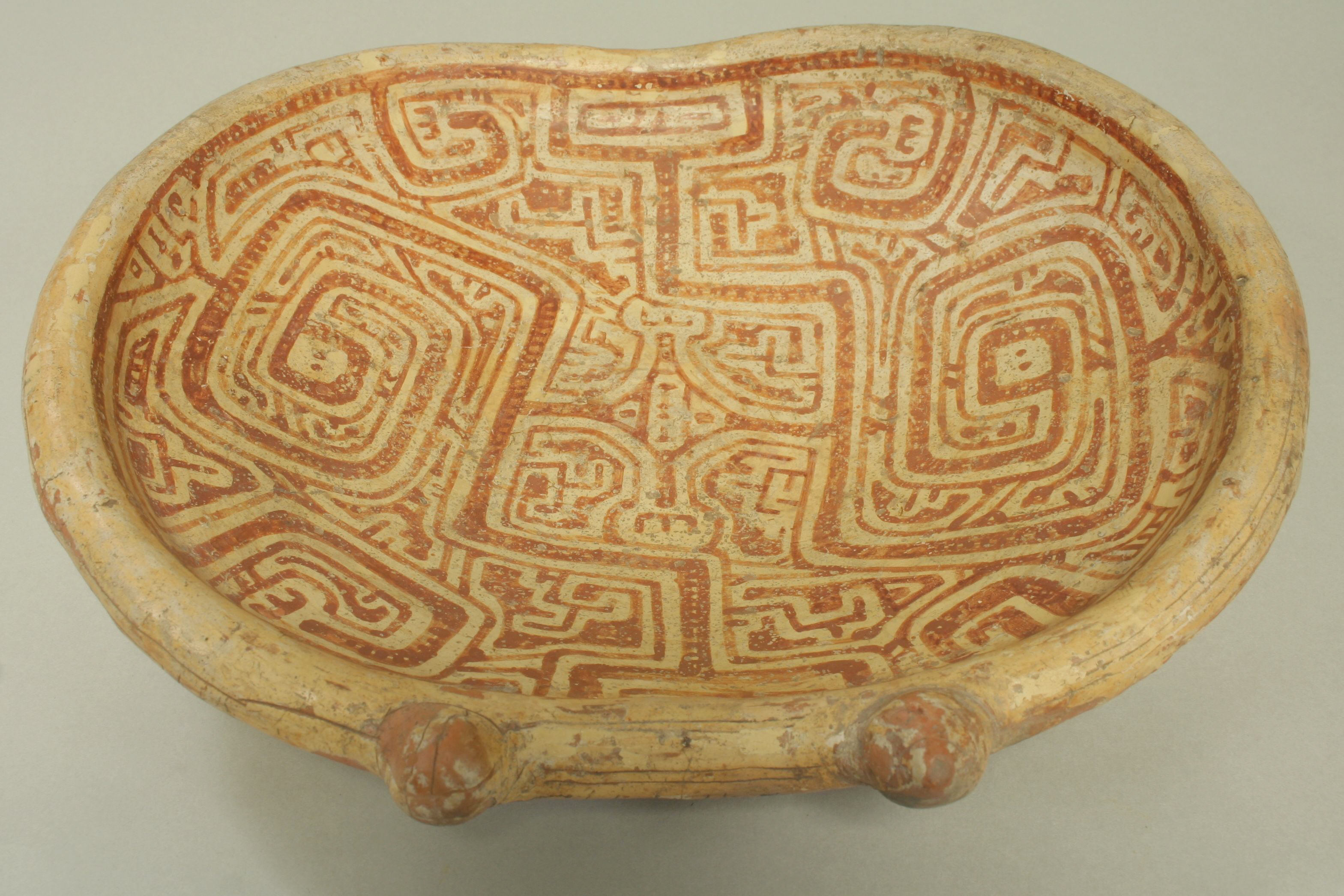
Marajoara plate

Plant remains on Marajo Island show a subsistence pattern that relied heavily on small seed crops, as well as small fish, which were either cultivated or protected by indigenous peoples. Many of the carbonized seed remains have not yet been identified, though they seem to be herbaceous and derived from local grasses. Trees such as the açai and tucuma palms also provided important supplements in the Marajo diet and were used for manufacturing items such as baskets or canoes. Evidence from human remains shows that Marajo peoples limited their consumption of starchy root crops like manioc; rather, the heavy wear patterns of teeth suggest a diet based predominantly on seed crops, tree fruits, and fish. Since small fish make up the majority of biomass fauna and there are relatively few terrestrial animals, it follows that pre-historic peoples focused on the abundant populations of small fish. The method for catching fish was likely very similar to present-day techniques, which involves stunning fish with the poisonous liana plant and collecting them as they float to the surface. This method of mass harvesting is not as useful in the rainy season as it is during the dry months when fish are trapped in receding streams or ponds.

The agricultural technology at Marajo is limited to, primarily, stone axes that were introduced in the Marajoara Phase. Other stone artifacts include griddles found at Teso Dos Bichos during Roosevelt’s excavations, although these are very rare. Their rarity is another marker of the absence of root crops from the diet at Marajo.

Earthen mounds, unlike lithic artifacts, are abundant. They were used for cemetery purposes as well as for habitation, as the low-lying areas are prone to flooding in the rainy season. Mounds may have served a defensive purpose too. Pre-historic peoples of Marajo Island may have also constructed ramps, canals, ponds, and drained fields found near earthworks mounds, but most of the evidence has likely been buried by sediment in seasonal floods.

Evidence for trade networks at Marajo is found mostly in lithics, because the island has no local source of suitable igneous or metamorphic rock. None of the lithic artifacts have been sourced, although they are primarily made from a green, microcrystalline mafic rock. Such greenstones are typically more associated with Mesoamerica, a possible point of origin for Marajo’s imported stone.

An increased complexity of ceremonial wares and uniformity of utilitarian wares occurred with the Marajoara phase, suggesting ceramic manufacture became a specialized industry at this time. Sometime into the Marajoara phase, however, there was a decline in characteristics that indicated specialization of ceramics.

== Architecture ==
Many of the excavations on Marajo island have focused on the largest earthen mound sites. Smaller mounds and non-mound sites likely outnumber them.

Multi-level stratification of sites by size:

- 3 to 4 very large multi-mound sites such as Os Camutins with 40 mounds, or Fortaleza with 20. These housed several thousand people; e.g. Os Camutins had a population of about 10,000
- Many more smaller multi-mound sites with 3 to 5 mounds each, for example Monte Carmelo
- Numerous single mound sites, such as Teso do Sitio. These housed between a few hundred and about a thousand people
- Countless low-mound and non-mound sites

Mounds predominate in the lowest areas that are most prone to severe flooding. They were constructed of earthen materials, and garbage was used as fill to maintain them.

The mounds served many purposes, for example as cemeteries, for habitation, for militaristic defense, and as a defense against seasonal flooding.

The mounds housed residential structures similar to present-day malocas, which are Amazonian longhouses. These were multi-family structures with several hearths lined up along the center of the building; each hearth likely represented one nuclear family. The malocas were arranged east to west and generally grouped in a concentric oval pattern. They were built of earth, wooden poles, and thatch roofs. They were occupied continually as evidenced by superimposed layers of structures, with up to 20 structures built atop one another at some places, such as Os Camutins. There were permanent cooking facilities made of baked clay and plastered floors, which were frequently repaired over time.

There are also monumental earthworks, causeways, ramps, canals, ponds, and drained fields that have been buried by extensive sedimentation.

== Art and symbolism ==
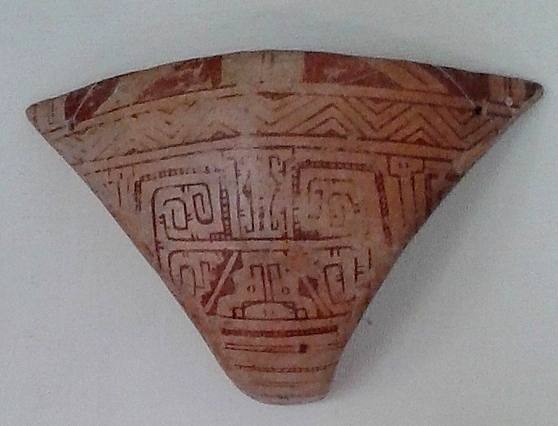
Marajoara ceramic, female symbol?

The most common motif found in Marajoara iconography involves female imagery such as females as mythical ancestors, creators, cultural heroes, or females portrayed in shamanistic roles and with shamanistic power. These female motifs are typically found on ceramic artifacts, either pottery vessels or statues.

Pieces can be found in the collections of museums in the region and even internationally, such as the Museum of Marajó, Museum of Emílio Goeldi, National Historical Museum (Brazil - Rio de Janeiro), Museum of Archaeology and Ethnology of USP, Professor Oswaldo Rodrigues Cabral University Museum, American Museum of Natural History (New York).

However, among the most significant ceramic collections in the region, the Marajó Museum, created in 1972, brings together pieces of everyday use and customs, relating to the civic-religious aspect of civilization. The museum was created to promote and make known to the public the culture and art of an ancient civilization.

== Artifacts ==
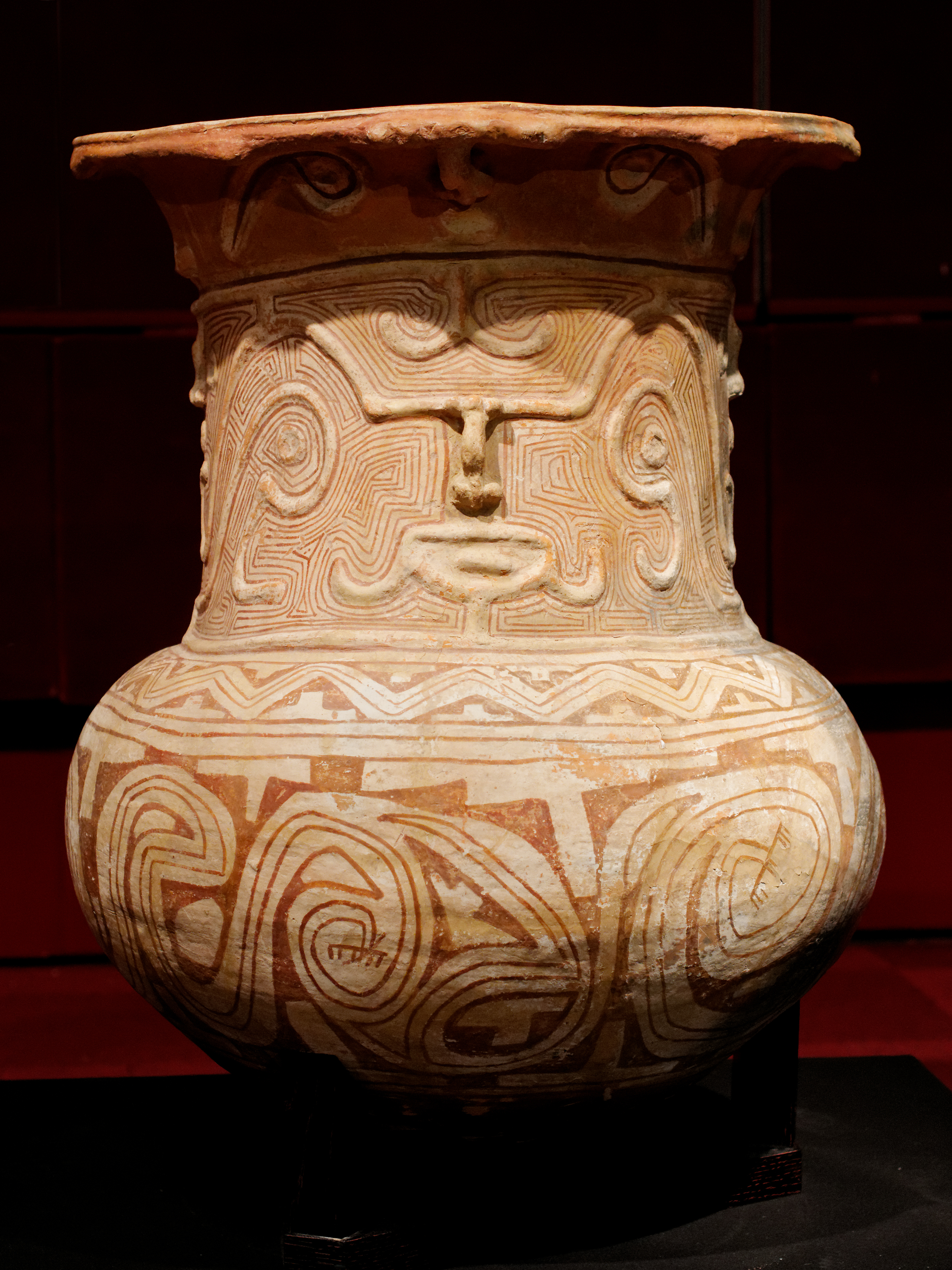
Funerary urn, Collection H. Law

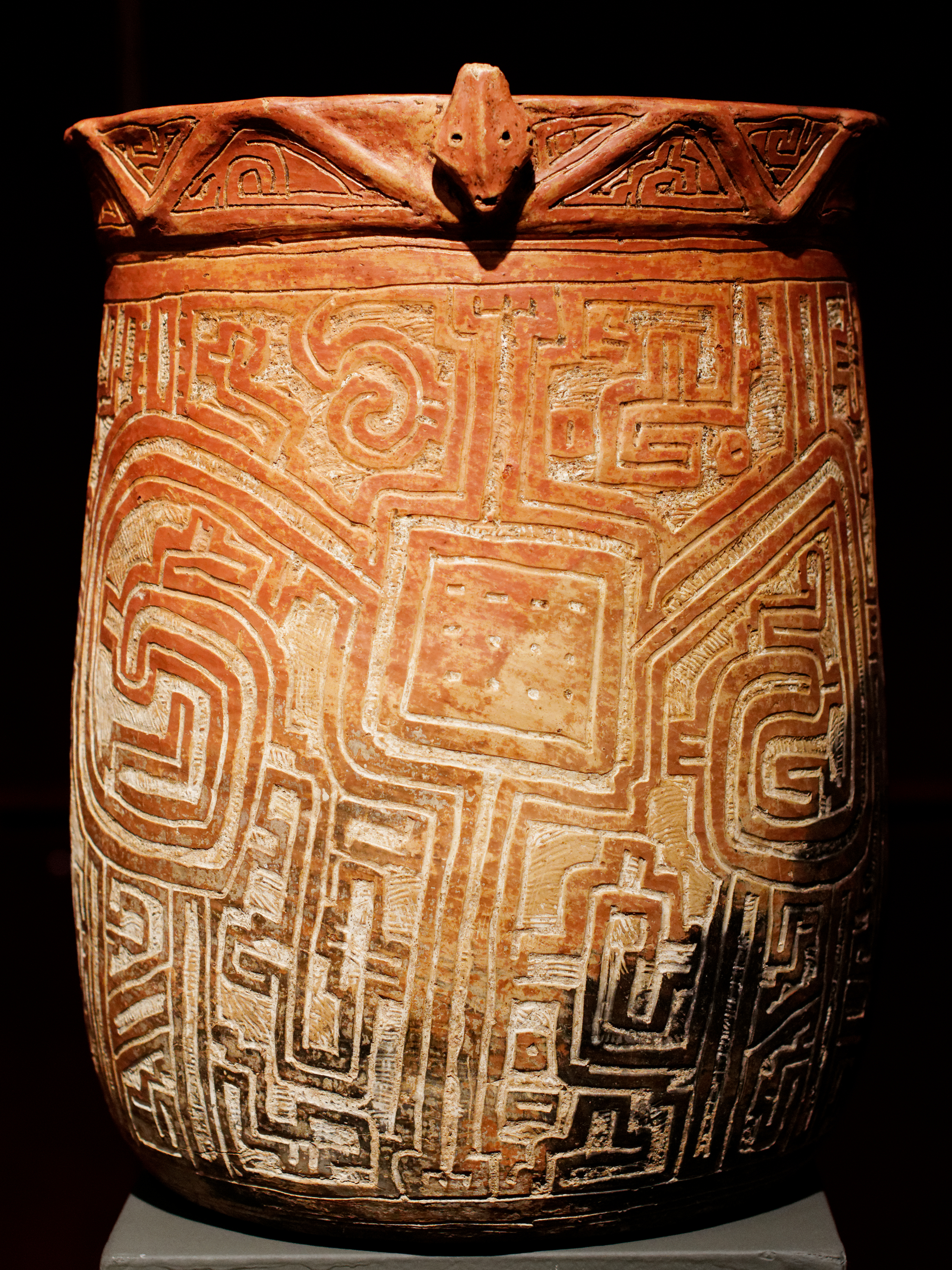
Vase, Collection H. Law

The people on Marajo produced many diverse artifacts such as pottery vessels (urns, jars, bottles, cups, bowls, plates, dishes), figurines, large statues, pubic covers, pendants, ear and lip jewelry, whistles, spindle whorls, and ceramic miniatures of axes, mashers, hammers, and other tools. Lithics were very rare because Marajo island has no source of suitable stone. Lithics that have been found suggest they were used as high-status items and gifts, or they were used in craft production

Elaborate pottery vessels were found in garbage fills between houses and in graves, but not around hearths, which contained only plain domestic wares. Additionally, the low mound and non-mound sites contain very little if any fineware. Some artifacts are found only at specific sites; for example, Teso dos Bichos contains thousands of small ceramic and sandstone abraders, which are very rare or absent from other sites.

The general pattern of change found throughout artifacts on Marajo, especially in ceramics, is one that moves toward more complex, elaborate, and specialized wares through the Marajoara Phase, thought specialization and complexity later declined.

=== Ceramics ===
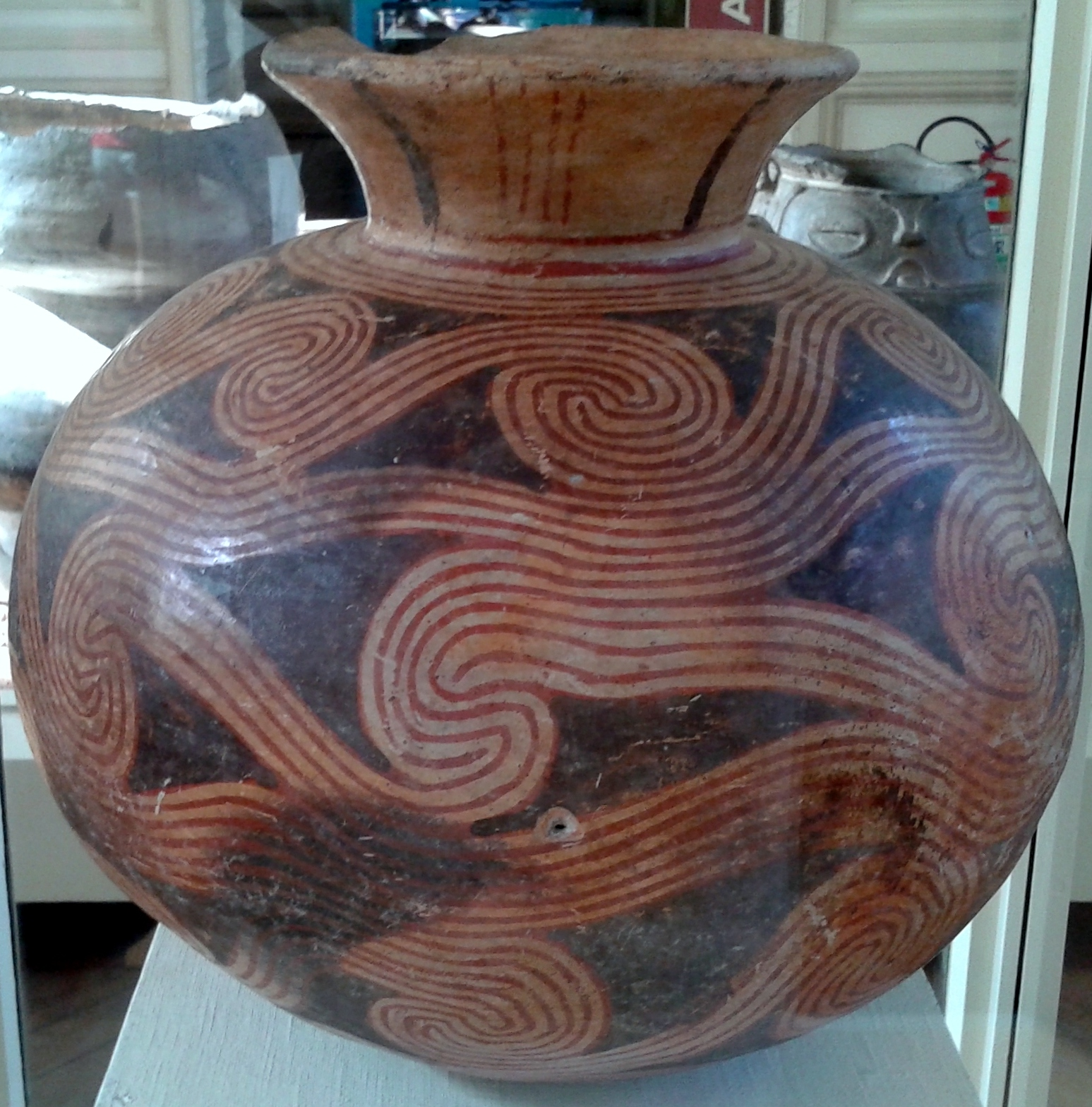
Marajoara culture, Globular vase, Museu Nacional.

The Marajoara art is a type of pottery produced by Indigenous peoples from the period of Marajoara occupation on the Brazilian island of Marajó, during Brazil's pre-colonial period from 400 to 1400 AD, and is thus called Marajoara ceramics, because there are successive phases of occupation in the region, each with its own distinctive pottery style. According to Samuel Lopes, manager of the School of Arts and Crafts of Pará de Minas, this art represents the origin of pottery in Brazil

The Indigenous people of Marajó made both useful and decorative objects. Among the various objects found by researchers are bowl, jugs, Coffins, toys, statue, flowerpot, plates, and thong. The igaçaba, for example, was a kind of clay pot or large water jug that was used to preserve food and other items. Today there are several copies of Marajó's igaçabas.

They all have a great diversity of shapes and decoration patterns, one of the best known being globular urns with painted and modeled decorations illustrating anthropomorphic figures (primates). Other types of urns combine painting, the use of incisions and excisions, and modeling representing anthropomorphic and zoomorphic figures. Other vases were decorated with paintings of geometric patterns, including more simplified forms such as bowls, and others with more complex forms such as double-base vases, funerary urns, small statues, plates, thongs, and bowls on pedestals.

Travelers in the 1800s noted both the presence of mounds and the beauty of the ceramics found inside them or exposed on their sides. Museums in Europe and the United States began to collect some of the larger and more beautiful pieces, the largest of which are funerary urns. Buried in house floors constructed on the tops of the mounds, the elaborately decorated urns contain the remains of significant individuals. When the individuals died, the flesh was cleared from their bones and the remains were placed in the urns, which were then topped with a bowl or platter.

Marajoara ceramics are generally characterized by the use of red or black paint on a white background, applying techniques that combined colors, which were extracted from elements of nature, such as urucum; kaolin; jenipapo; charcoal, and; soot.

One of the most widely used techniques for decorating this pottery is champlevé or raised field, where designs are achieved in relief by decaling designs onto a smoothed surface and then excavating the unmarked area.

Among the most common decorative motifs found on these ceramics are animals from the Amazon fauna, such as snakes and monkeys, the human figure and Antropozoomorfismo figures. In order to increase the resistance of the final product, antiplastics or seasonings were added to the clay, including gravel, bone and shell ashes. Antiplastic or seasoning are terms used to designate elements such as shards, ground shells, burnt and pillaged tree bark, sponge spicules, sand, etc. that are added to the clay to make it more resistant and prevent it from breaking during the process of making an artifact.

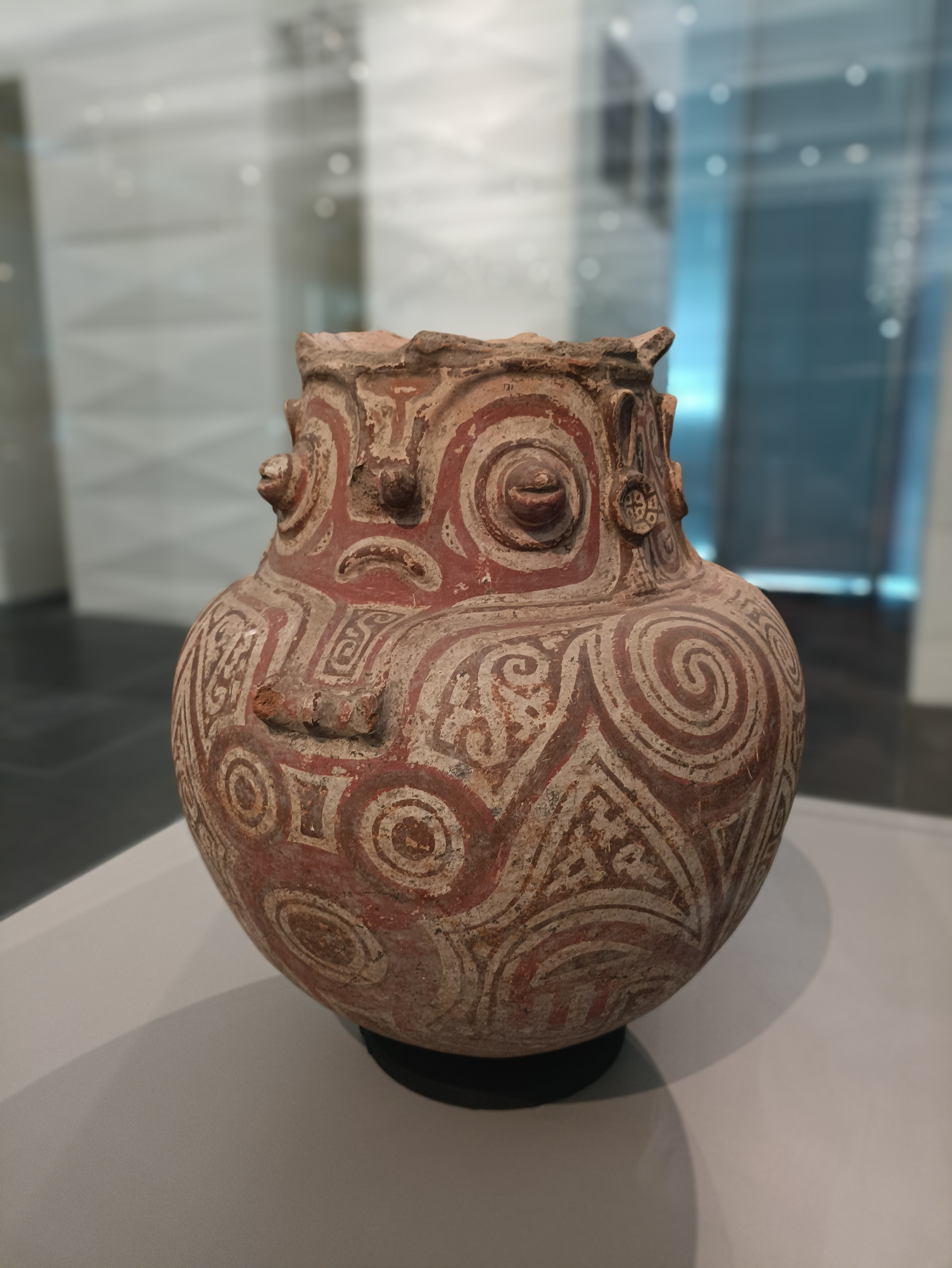
Funerary urn produced on Marajó Island between the 5th and 15th centuries AD. It is currently housed at MASP.

After being modeled, the piece was painted, if the author so wished, with various pigments, with abundant red in all the pieces found, and only then fired in an open fire. It was varnished after the ceramic was fired, giving the piece a glossy appearance. Around fifteen techniques for finishing the pieces are known, revealing one of the most complex and sophisticated ceramic styles in pre-colonial Latin America.

The more elaborate artifacts were intended for funerary or ritual use. The artifacts found that show everyday use have less elaborate decoration.

In the period between the 19th and 20th centuries, Marajoara ceramics were used for different and specific purposes, from scientific objects to inspiration for Brazilian art, including decorative art. Intellectuals and artists thus elaborated a range of (re)meanings of the ceramic legacy of the ancient Indians of Marajó. The Marajoara ceramics were also used for different purposes.

Rescuing pieces of Marajoara ceramics is made difficult by the periodic flooding and even by the numerous thefts and looting of the material, which is often smuggled out of Brazil. In addition to the urns, ceramic artifacts include plates, bowls, vases, and tangas (female pubic coverings).

Nowadays, pieces based on Marajoara art are used as decorative objects and sold at craft fairs and local shops. They are also used as decorative objects.

== Leadership and inequality ==
Although some characteristics do point to stratification, the evidence regarding inequality and leadership is inconclusive as to whether it was gender or class-based, or whether it represented centralized rule. The existence of large mounds and large, multi-family malocas, complex crafts, and intensive subsistence is typically interpreted as evidence for centralized authority and stratified socioeconomic classes, but this is not an empirically supported assumption However, the data regarding leadership is inconclusive as to whether or not there was a centralized rule. Ethnohistoric records describe civic-ceremonial leaders, but the Marajoara existed several centuries before European contact and may have been quite different from the later contact-period societies. Marajoara iconography does not suggest a centralized political authority but does suggest social ranking based on matrilineal genealogy

Skeletal traits also point to some sort of stratification, likely between elites and commoners. It was very clear through bone analysis that some individuals were well-nourished and tall, while others were significantly shorter and consumed poorer diets. Further, some skull deformation among the well-nourished skeletons also point to an elite class. Despite the current evidence, only a few individuals have been examined. A more comprehensive, systematic investigation of burials and houses is required to tell whether the differentiation in food production and consumption was based on class or gender.

There is evidence that women held a lower status relative to men in Marajo, but other evidence suggests women commanded more importance and higher status than they do in contemporary Amazonia Interpretations of the society are difficult to define. For example, women are featured prominently in Marajoara art, portrayed as creators and lineage heroes or founders. Also, households were matrilocal and women were important in subsistence production. Amazonian ethnohistory describes many floodplain societies with matrilineal descent reckoned from a mythical female ancestor. Amazonian ethnohistorical evidence also points to women holding high socioeconomic status, as well as holding leading political and ritual roles.

The fact that women are largely absent from elaborate burial urns and number very few at all compared to male skeletons could be regarded as evidence for gender stratification. However, high-ranking women do not always hold political positions and thus their absence from elaborate burials does not necessarily indicate lower status.

Low-mound and non-mound sites have far fewer, if any, elaborate ceramics. Additionally, elaborate ceramics are found only in garbage and burial contexts, not around hearths. This could suggest that women primarily made and used domestic plainware, while men primarily controlled ceremonial fineware Nonetheless, the true relationship between ceramic distribution and social rank is still unclear and needs to be further investigated

== Religion and ideology ==
The belief system of the Marajo people is not wholly understood, though it almost certainly involved important female figures. Marajoara iconography and art portrays women with shamanistic powers and roles, consistent with societies that reckon descent through a mythical female ancestor. There were parallels to Amazonian cosmology, which understands the universe to be gender divided, with men related to the sun and women to the moon. Further, ancestral females regarded as creators in Amazonian cosmology may be represented in Marajoaran iconography. Marajo settlement patterns are aligned east-to-west, consistent with a gender-divided universe. It is possible that ancestor worship was very important, as the deceased were placed in urns and buried in the mounds that the Marajoarans used for residence.

== Death ==
The most common type of tomb is the burial urn. Grave goods typically include lithics and elaborate ceramics. The skeletal remains were preserved very well in burial urns, which were covered with clayey soil. Few female skeletons have been found yet.

"My sources did not discuss the causes of death, but did state there the available skeletons showed relatively few pathologies and lived healthier lives with more nutritious diets than post-contact Amazonians"

Despite the importance, abundance, and ease of excavation, very few Marajo cemeteries have been systematically excavated and analyzed.

== Warfare and violence ==
While skeletal remains have not been analyzed for trauma patterns yet, they do show peculiar signs of muscle development that strongly suggest regular participation in warfare. The patterns of muscle development are similar to those in modern wrestlers, who practice and train specifically to wrestle. Finding similar muscle development suggests Marajoarans trained for combat. The earthen mounds could clearly serve defensive purposes in addition to flood protection. Other than the defensive position of residences atop earthen mounds, there is relatively little evidence that can either confirm or deny the existence of warfare or localized violence. However, the frequent presence of warfare in many other societies around the world makes it unlikely that Marajoarans lived in complete peace.

== Collapse ==
Marajo Island is thought to have been occupied until shortly before European conquest, which puts the abandonment date around AD 1300. Abandonment is determined by the fact that structures ceased to be repaired and maintained, and no further building occurred after this time. The factors causing the island to be abandoned have not yet been determined.

== See also ==
- Indigenous Art Park
- Indigenous Ceramics
- Indian Art
- Museum of Indian Arts and Culture
- Marajó Bay
- Marajó Archipelago

== Bibliography ==
- Meggers, Betty J.; Evans, Clifford (1957a). Archaeological Investigations at the Mouth of the Amazon, U.S. Washington, D.C.
- Roosevelt, Anna C. (1991a). Moundbuilders of the Amazon: Geophysical Archaeology on Marajo Island, Brazil. San Diego, CA: Academic Press.
