= Serra da Raiz =

Coordinates: 6°41′S 35°26′W

- Municipality
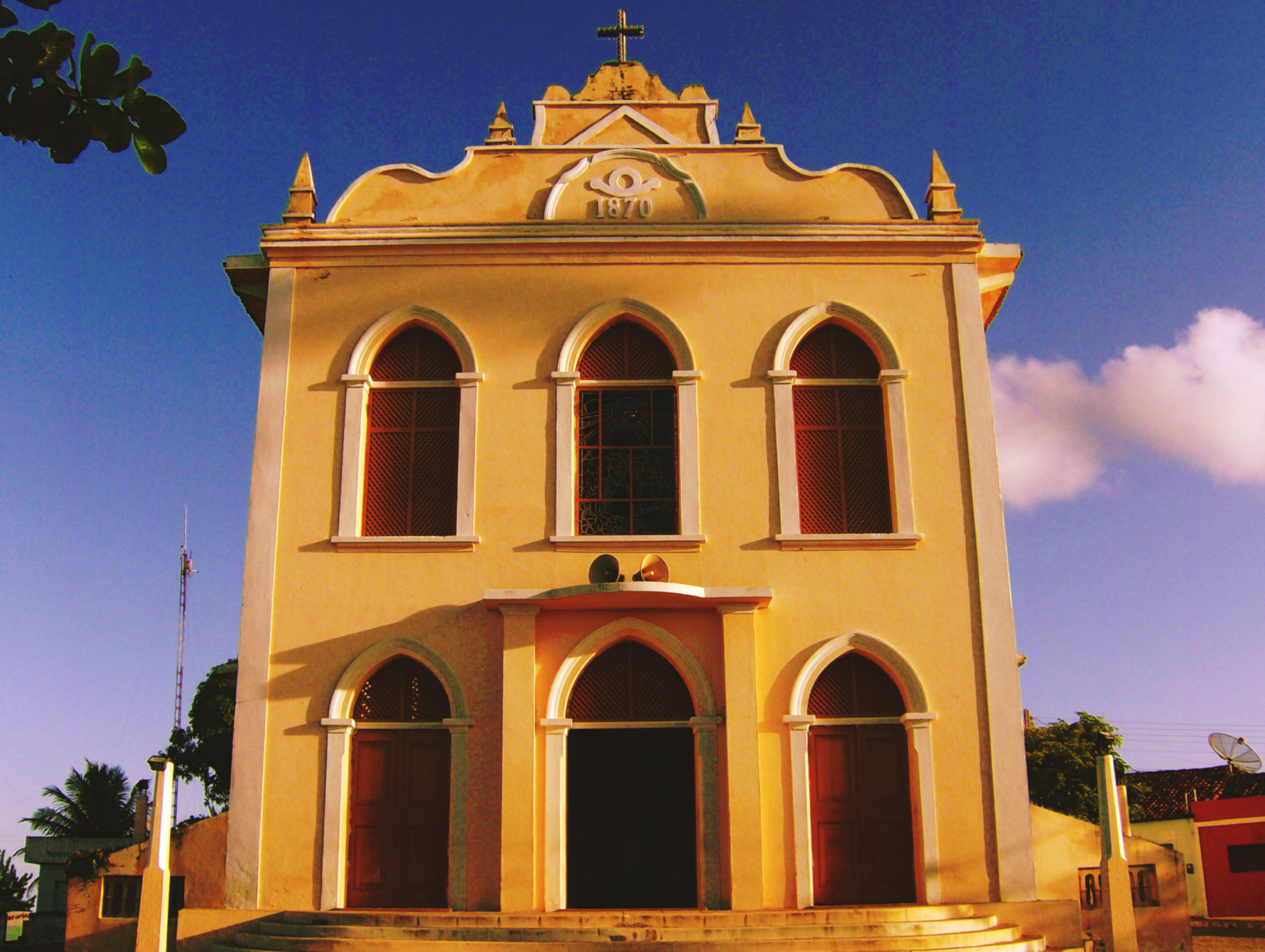

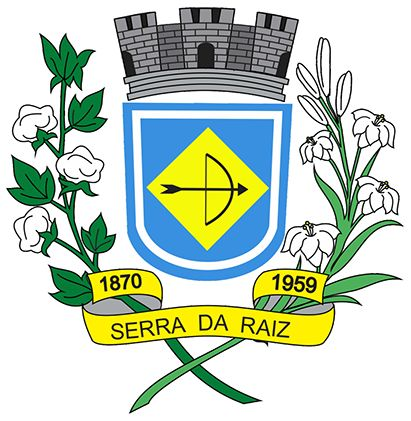
- Flag Coat of arms
- Interactive map of Serra da Raiz
- Country: Brazil
- Region: Northeast
- State: Paraíba
- Mesoregion: Agreste Paraibano

Population (2020)
  - Total: 3,131
- Time zone: UTC−3 (BRT)

Serra da Raiz (Central northeastern portuguese pronunciation: [ˈsɛhɐ dɐ hɐˈjs]) is a municipality in the state of Paraíba in the Northeast Region of Brazil.

== See also ==
- List of municipalities in Paraíba
