= Margarida Davina Andreatta =

Brazilian archaeologist

- Born: 5 August 1922
- Died: 1 January 2015 (aged 92)

Academic background
- Education: Pontifical Catholic University of Paraná; University of São Paulo

Academic work
- Discipline: archaeology
- Sub-discipline: historical archaeology industrial archaeology
- Institutions: University of São Paulo; Museu Paulista

Margarida Davina Andreatta (5 August 1922 – 1 January 2015) was a Brazilian historical and industrial archaeologist.

Davina Andreatta studied geography and history at the Pontifical Catholic University of Paraná, graduating in 1957, and received a doctorate in social anthropology from the University of São Paulo (USP) in 1982. From 1972 she worked as a researcher at the Museu Paulista, and also taught at USP. Over the course of her career Davina Andreatta worked on fifty-four archaeological sites, specialising in historic sites in and around São Paulo. In 2009 she received an Outstanding Achievement Award from the Sociedade de Arqueologia Brasileira and the Instituto do Patrimônio Histórico e Artístico Nacional, recognising her contribution to the national archaeology of Brazil.
