= TV Clube (Teresina) =

TV Clube (ZYB 350)
Teresina, Piauí; Brazil
- Channels: Digital: 26 (UHF); Virtual: 4
- Branding: Rede Clube; TV Clube

Programming
- Affiliations: TV Globo

Ownership
- Owner: Sistema Clube de Comunicação; (TV Rádio Clube de Teresina S.A.)
- Sister stations: FM Clube; Clube News FM

History
- First air date: December 3, 1972
- Former channel numbers: Analog: 4 (VHF, 1972–2018)
- Former affiliations: Rede de Emissoras Independentes and Rede Tupi (1972-1976)

Technical information
- Licensing authority: ANATEL
- ERP: 4.8 kW
- Transmitter coordinates: 5°6′36.1″S 42°47′45.2″W

Links
- Public license information: Profile
- Website: redeglobo.globo.com/pi/redeclube

TV Clube (channel 4, also known as Rede Clube) is a Brazilian television station based in Teresina, capital of the state of Piauí, Brazil affiliated with TV Globo. It was founded on December 3, 1972, by engineer and professor Valter Alencar, being the first TV station in said state. It is the flagship broadcast station of locally based Sistema Clube de Comunicacão, which also includes radio stations FM Clube and Clube News. The station broadcasts its programming for 93 municipalities alongside sister station TV Alvorada in Floriano.

== History ==
The history of the future TV Clube de Teresina began in 1962, when engineer and professor Valter Alencar, then director of Rádio Clube (founded in 1960), filed a request for a concession for a TV station, intending to create a "University of the Air". At the time of the request, the State of Piauí, unlike neighboring states, was the only one that had not installed or opened a television station.

However, setting up Piauí's first TV station was difficult: first, with the news of the request, there was resistance from the local advertising market that was unfamiliar with television, as until then it had only advertised on radio stations and newspapers; second was due to the concession in which it would be the first TV station. According to Valter Alencar Filho, from the request to the concession, his father had difficulties:

"The concession was my father's greatest suffering, as there was another person named Valter Alencar who was a communist and had this obstacle. Furthermore, there were politicians who didn't want to for him to have this station in his hands. My father fought, he went to Brasília until Senator Petrônio Portela resolved the problem and got the channel."

The concession was approved and published in the Diário da União in 1965 by the Ministry of Communications, for commercial TV purposes, under the name TV Rádio Clube de Teresina S/A (corporate name of TV Clube).

In the following years, Alencar formed several partners to make the station viable, raise money to build the station's headquarters, which came to be called Colosso do Monte Castelo, and then buy equipment. Among the partners were electronics technician Raimundo Nonato de Albuquerque.

From the request until it went on air, it took ten years to wait for the release of a television channel for Piauí, which many did not believe and for this, Alencar sacrificed a large part of his modest heritage, which compromised his health, he left aside his profitable law practice and dedicated himself almost exclusively to the construction of the "Colossus of Monte Castelo", where the future headquarters of his enterprise would be. Alencar became known as "Piauí's TV Man".

TV Clube opened on December 3, 1972, after two months of testing. The first slogan "A Força de um Ideal" ("The Strength of an Ideal") was launched (which remains to this day, even with other slogans). In its own building, it was named "Edifício Presidente Médici". The station's first logo was Cabeça de Cuia, which remained until 1976.

The first images to go on air were from the news program Tele Quatro, and the first presenter was Gamalie Noronha, at a time when there was no teleprompter, when Noronha read the news on paper and then looked at the camera.

The programming interspersed several local programs with those from Rede de Emissoras Independentes (formed by TV Record and TV Rio) and Rede Tupi. The first years of TV Clube's operation passed and the company's structural problems began to directly affect its relationship with the public. Despite having imported labor from the neighboring state of Ceará, there were problems in this field, as local professionals came from radio, with no TV experience. Afterwards, the company had its origins in the family nucleus and it seems that the creator of the station was also learning how to do it. The station “suffered from the lack of definition of content, lack of structure and production experience, lack of resources and mismatch between an idealistic administration and the demands of market logic”.

From 1972 to 1976, the station's revenue remained low and local programming was limited, which prevented it from offering a good programming schedule, due to Teresina's businesspeople still being reluctant to invest in the new vehicle and television media and the lack of encouragement from the Government of Piauí and local commerce conditions. This set of problems was decisive for TV Clube's affiliation with Globo, a fact that put an end to the majority of programs produced at the local level.

In the early years, commercials were made "live", with announcers reading texts in front of some slides, until buying and enlarging dividers for the use of videotape for local editions. In 1973, according to Segisnando Alencar, at a party promoted by TV Clube, the invitation came for the broadcaster to be affiliated with Rede Globo. “We were at a party when we were introduced to Célio Pereira, one of Walter Clark's right-hand men, who was Globo's expansion director. He said he wanted us to go to a meeting in Rio de Janeiro, at Globo headquarters, with Clark, Boni and Roberto Marinho. And so it was done.", he explained.

In December of the same year, two years after TV Clube went on air, the broadcaster finally became an affiliate of Rede Globo. Despite the affiliation with Globo, the station's programming remained independent, interspersing local programs with content from REI and Tupi. During this brief period, the station was affiliated to three networks.

At the time, only Jornal Nacional and Fantástico were shown live, while other programs (telenovelas, cartoons, series, films, among other programs) were sent by daily planes via mail to Teresina, which caused delays of days or weeks in relation to the programming shown in the Rio-São Paulo axis, and the station was often forced to repeat programs from the previous day when there was a problem during the process. This lasted until 1983, when Globo began showing all programming via satellite.

With updated programming and "live" broadcasts, TV Clube began to make a greater investment in personnel: it hired the best professionals in the State and created a schedule of courses. During this period, the company's journalism department had only one external team, where the reporter maintained great harmony with the cameraman and his V-8 camera and the stories were "edited" in the field.

On January 25, 1975, after two months of rigorous medical treatment, Valter Alencar died at 4:15 am at Hospital Getúlio Vargas, due to heart problems. With the death of Valter Alencar, his sons, Segisnando Alencar and Valter Alencar Filho, took charge of TV Clube which, in the following years, began to invest in more equipment and in the expansion of both local and Rede Globo programming.

In 1976, it started to exclusively show Globo's programming, with the end of contracts with REI and Tupi. In the 70s, the broadcaster produced the programs TP Estúdio (presented by the actor Tarcísio Prado and on Mondays by the comedian and former councilor of Teresina, Deusdeth Nunes), Encontros e Debates (by Chico Costa); the auditorium programs Elvira Som & Imagem and Assunto Classe A (presented by social columnist, Elvira Raulino). However, the station was experiencing the drama of a lack of archives and technical insufficiency to meet a simple image request, due to a lack of U-matic tapes.

In 1992, the Valter Alencar Foundation was established, which is responsible for storing all of TV Clube's historical collection, in addition to holding seminars, training courses and distributing scholarships. All in accordance with Valter Alencar's purposes: to provide education, to train and inform the young people of Piauí.

In August 1998, TV Clube started to have its own satellite signal, allowing inland cities with retransmitters to start receiving the signal with better quality and reliability of sound and vision. As a result, the terrestrial signal from the Piauí Telecommunications Company (Etelpi), a state-owned company owned by the State Government, was no longer used by new technology. Thanks to the new transmission, in cities where there are satellite dishes (pointed at the satellite that transmits the broadcaster) connected with receivers in studios that generate a signal to the relay tower installed for cities or regions, in the following years, the station reaches 70% of the cities in Piauí.

At the end of 2001, on the eve of the broadcaster's 29th-anniversary celebrations, Clube began operating on the internet with the creation of Web Piauí, following the example of Globo.com, created in 1999. In 2006, on the eve of the 34th-anniversary celebrations broadcaster, Web Piauí is replaced by Portal da Clube.

On December 3, 2007, the station celebrated its 35th anniversary with a ceremony and the inauguration of the new transmitter, ensuring greater sound and audio quality that viewers receive. The station launched a special on the subject on Portal Clube.

Until May 31, 2011, TV Clube was responsible for covering 184 of the 221 municipalities in Piauí (equivalent to 85% of the State), including signals reaching east of Maranhão, west of Ceará and Pernambuco, in addition to northwest of Bahia. On June 1 of that year, the station lost its presence in many municipalities to TV Alvorada do Sul, which began broadcasting via satellite on StarOne C1 in 2010, which until then was only present in Floriano and Barão de Grajaú (Maranhão) for the analog signal since it went on air in 1997.

From then on, TV Alvorada started to cover 39 municipalities in the center of Piauí alone, bordering Maranhão and Pernambuco. With the loss of presence of municipalities to Alvorada, Clube started to serve 145 municipalities. During 2011 to 2012, the station left many municipalities without its signal, falling from 145 to 71 municipalities.

On April 1, 2012, TV Clube and TV Alvorada unified and formed Rede Clube.

== Technical information ==
Virtual	Digital	Screen	Content
4.1	26 UHF	1080i	TV Clube/Globo's main schedule

TV Clube began digital signal testing on Channel 26 UHF in May 2010.

On June 11, 2010, the broadcaster received the first batch of equipment for the definitive installation of Digital TV. More than 4 million were invested in the purchase of a 2.4KW power transmitter, capable of covering with digital signal all regions that already receive analogue through Channel 4. According to the engineering manager at TV Clube, Sérgio Paiva, between football matches, the test signal will continue to be shown on channel 26 UHF with excerpts from Rede Globo programs recorded in high definition.

On July 23, 2010, the station received the second batch of equipment for the definitive installation of Digital TV. TV Clube's first HD broadcast was the first game of the World Cup in June this year. The forecast is that TV Clube will begin broadcasting definitively on August 16, the anniversary of the capital of Piauí.

On August 16, 2010, the new sets debuted, and began definitively transmitting its digital signal, in the scheduled date.

Based on the federal decree transitioning Brazilian TV stations from analogue to digital signals, TV Clube, as well as other stations in Teresina and the metropolitan region, ceased their transmissions via channel 04 VHF on May 30, 2018, following the official ANATEL schedule. The signal was cut off at 11:59 pm, during Profissão Repórter, and was replaced by a warning from MCTIC and ANATEL about the switch-off.

== Programming ==
In addition to retransmitting Globo's national programming, TV Clube currently produces and broadcasts the following programs:

- Bom Dia Piauí: news, com Felipe Pereira;
- PITV 1.ª edição: news, com Marcelo Magno;
- PITV 2.ª edição: news, com Denise Freitas;
- Globo Esporte PI: sports news, com Renan Morais;
- G1 em 1 Minuto Piauí: brief news bulletins throughout the schedule;
- Piauí de Riquezas: variety, com Nayara Feitosa;
- Clube Rural: agribusiness news, com Ângela Bispo;
- Plantão Clube: breaking news.

The following were discontinued:

- Clube Notícia
- Programão
- Bom Dia Sábado

== Relayers ==
Starting in 1998 and throughout the 2000s, the broadcaster replaced terrestrial antenna links by transmitting programming via satellite to the interior of Piauí, with links close to the capital Teresina. To retransmit its signals in the interior, TV Clube uses free of charge infrastructure belonging to the Public Authorities, transmission towers from city halls (City Hall) or from the Piauí Telecommunications Company (Etelpi), which also owns the vast majority of RTV relay licenses that used in the state.

Lista de retransmissoras

City	Analog	Digital	City	Analog	Digital	City	Analog	Digital	City	Analog	Digital
Agricolândia	11	-	Água Branca	08	-	Alto Longá	27	-	Altos	12	-
Angical do Piauí	13	-	Aroazes	-	-	Assunção do Piauí	-	-	Avelino Lopes	-	-
Baixa Grande do Ribeiro	-	-	Barra d'Alcântara	-	-	Barras	12	-	Barro Duro	09	-
Batalha	40	-	Beneditinos	-	-	Boa Hora	-	-	Bocaina	-	-
Bom Princípio do Piauí	-	-	Boqueirão do Piauí	-	-	Brasileira	-	-	Buriti dos Lopes	09	-
Buriti dos Montes	-	-	Cabeceiras do Piauí	09	-	Cajueiro da Praia	-	-	Campo Largo do Piauí	-	-
Campo Maior	13	-	Canavieira	09	-	Canto do Buriti	09	-	Capitão de Campos	-	-
Castelo do Piauí	-	-	Cocal	07	-	Cocal de Telha	-	-	Coivaras	-	-
Corrente	20	-	Cristino Castro	-	-	Curimatá	09	-	Demerval Lobão	-	26
Domingos Mourão	-	-	Elesbão Veloso	07	-	Esperantina	13	-	Francinópolis	-	-
Gilbués	13	-	Hugo Napoleão	09	-	Inhuma	13	-	Itainópolis	09	-
Jaicós	-	-	Jardim do Mulato	09	-	Jatobá do Piauí	-	-	Joaquim Pires	03	-
José de Freitas	04	26 UHF
Lagoa Alegre	-	-	Lagoa de São Francisco	-	-	Lagoinha do Piauí	09	-
Luís Correia	08	29	Luzilândia	30	-	Matias Olímpio	11	-	Miguel Alves	-	-
Miguel Leão	13	-	Milton Brandão	-	-	Monsenhor Gil	13	-	Morro do Chapéu do Piauí	-	-
Nazária	-	26	Nossa Senhora de Nazaré	-	-	Nossa Senhora dos Remédios	-	-	Novo Oriente do Piauí	-	-
Olho d'Água do Piauí	-	-	Palmeirais	07	-	Parnaguá	-	-	Parnaíba	-	29
Passagem Franca do Piauí	11	-	Paulistana	03	-	Pedro II	09	-	Pimenteiras	09	-
Piracuruca	09	-	Piripiri	09	-	Porto	-	-	Prata do Piauí	09	-
Redenção do Gurgueia	-	-	Regeneração	11	-	Ribeiro Gonçalves	-	-	Santa Cruz dos Milagres	11	-
Simplício Mendes	13	-	Simões	05	26*	Socorro do Piauí	-	-	São Félix do Piauí	-	-
São Gonçalo do Piauí	-	-	São José do Divino	-	-	São João da Serra	07	-	São João do Piauí	-	-
São Miguel da Baixa Grande	-	-	São Miguel do Tapuio	-	-	São Pedro do Piauí	11	-	São Raimundo Nonato	03	-
União	47	-	Valença do Piauí	12	-	Várzea Grande	55	-
