= Integrated Development Region of Greater Teresina =

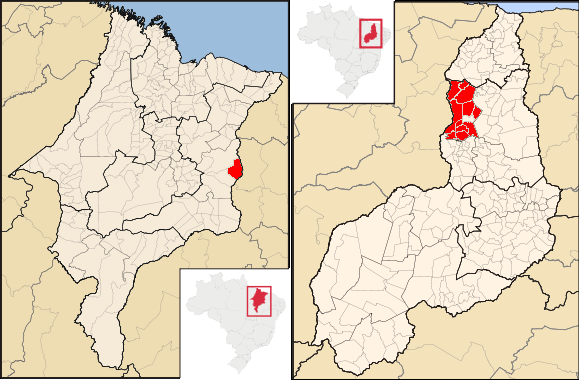
Map of Grand Teresina

The Integrated Development Region of Greater Teresina (Portuguese: Região Integrada de Desenvolvimento da Grande Teresina) was established by the Federal Decree No 4367, September 9, 2002. It covers the municipalities of Senior piauienses Altos, Beneditinos, Coivaras, Curralinhos, Demerval Lobão, José de Freitas, Lagoa Alegre, Lagoa do Piauí, Miguel Leão, Monsenhor Gil, Teresina and União, plus the municipality of Maranhão Timon, which is on the left Parnaíba the river, opposite the capital piauiense. These municipalities occupy an area of 10,527 km^{2}, in which 1,092 thousand people live, according to the Census 2007, the IBGE, representing 37% of the population of the state of Piauí.

The performance of RIDE covers the main areas of development of cities, including infrastructure, employment generation and vocational training, sanitation (water supply, sewage collection and treatment and cleaning of public service), use and occupation of land. With the installation of RIDE, all actions carried out in the municipalities are to be coordinated by the Council of Development Network, formed by mayors of the region, chosen by the Codevasf, representatives of state governments, which are responsible for choosing them and by members of Ministry of Integration and Development Company of the Valleys of San Francisco and Parnaíba.
