= Socorro =

Socorro is a Portuguese and Spanish noun meaning 'help' or 'relief' (cf. succour). It may also refer to:

== Places ==
- Socorro, São Paulo, a city in São Paulo state, Brazil
- Socorro (district of São Paulo), a district in São Paulo city, Brazil
- Socorro River, a river in Rio Grande do Sul state in southern Brazil
- Socorro Island, an older name for Guamblin Island, Chile
- Socorro, Santander, a town and municipality in Santander Department, Colombia
- Socorro Province, in the former country of Gran Colombia
- Socorro, Goa, a village in Goa, India
- Socorro Island (Isla Socorro), Mexico
- Socorro, Surigao del Norte, Philippines, a municipality
- Socorro, Oriental Mindoro, Philippines, a municipality
- Socorro, Quezon City, a barangay of Quezon City
- Socorro (Lisbon), a parish in Portugal
- Socorro, New Mexico, a city in the United States
- Socorro County, New Mexico
- Socorro, Texas, a city in the United States
- El Socorro (disambiguation), multiple uses
- Socorro do Piauí, Brazil

== People ==
- Socorro Acosta (1934–2024), Filipino politician
- Héctor Socorro (1912–1980), Cuban footballer
- Juan Carlos Socorro (born 1972), Venezuelan footballer
- Socorro Acioli (born 1975), Brazilian author
- Socorro Hernandez-Bernasconi (born 1941), Mexican-American teacher and activist
- Socorro Santiago (born 1951), American actress
- Socorro Tellado Lopez (1927–2009), Spanish author
- Socorro Venegas (born 1972), Mexican writer
- Vilma Socorro Martínez (born 1943), American diplomat

== Animals ==
- Socorro blenny
- Socorro dove
- Socorro elf owl
- Socorro isopod (Socorro sowbug)
- Socorro mockingbird
- Socorro parakeet
- Socorro springsnail
- Socorro towhee
- Socorro wren

== Other uses ==
- Socorro (TransMilenio), a mass transit station in Bogotá, Colombia
- Church of Our Lord of Socorro, Ponte de Lima, Portugal
- socorro, a breakpad server written in Python
- Socorro Nobre, a 1995 documentary film
- Socorro Rojo Internacional, International Red Aid
- Socorro Rojo del P.O.U.M., a Spanish aid society during the 1930s civil war
- "Socorro", a song by Brazilian singer Bruno Sutter off his 2015 album Bruno Sutter
