= TV Alvorada (Floriano) =

TV Alvorada (ZYB 354)
- Floriano, Piauí; Brazil
- Channels: Digital: 25 (UHF); Virtual: 6
- Branding: Rede Clube; TV Alvorada

Programming
- Affiliations: TV Globo

Ownership
- Owner: Sistema Clube de Comunicação; (Televisão Alvorada do Sul Ltda. (TV Clube Centro-Sul))
- Sister stations: Alvorada FM

History
- Founded: 1996
- First air date: 10 January 1997
- Former channel numbers: Analog: 6 (VHF, 1997–2025)

Technical information
- Licensing authority: ANATEL
- ERP: 0.5 kW
- Transmitter coordinates: 6°47′5.3″S 43°0′57.9″W

Links
- Public license information: Profile
- Website: redeglobo.globo.com/pi/redeclube

TV Alvorada (channel 6, also known as TV Alvorada do Sul) is a Brazilian television station based in Floriano, a city in the state of Piauí and is affiliated with TV Globo. It is owned by Sistema Clube de Comunicação, and together with Teresina-based TV Clube, it makes up the Rede Clube network, covering 43 municipalities in the center-south of the state.

== History ==
TV Alvorada started from a TV concession in Floriano that was disputed between senator João Lobo, owner of radio Alvorada FM and deputy Jesus Elias Tajra, owner of TV Pioneira de Teresina, a Band affiliate at the time (today TV Cidade Verde, an SBT affiliate). The concession was for a generator, with the arrival of George Pinho, João Lobo's son-in-law, he began to boost the station's project starting in 1995, with a deadline to follow. If the station did not follow the plan, it would be left without a concession. At the time, Floriano did not have qualified labor to help create the station's headquarters, along with the high cost of equipment and the 30% inflation that Brazil had at the time. The biggest challenge at the time of construction was the tower. The old tower that was built for the radio station had to be dismantled, finding a solution in order to enable Alvorada FM to continue operating without suspending the radio station during the construction of the new TV tower. Along with the tower, an 800 kg antenna was installed. Much of the work had the support of Gorge Pinho, who had some knowledge in the technical field. At the request of his wife at the time, Rosa Lobo, the plan was to launch the station before the 1998 FIFA World Cup, which would be within the deadline.

Using amateur equipment, the first signal tests were carried out by pirating signals from other networks, and then, by pirating Globo's national signal. The signal was frequently cut off due to a complaint to make a query to eventually start relaying the network in compliance. To regularize the situation, negotiations were held with TV Clube in Teresina. At the time, TV Clube covered the entire state of Piauí and was afraid of losing coverage in the southern region. Jesus Tajra spoke to the Alencar family, from TV Clube, saying that he had no interest in the concession, offering the Floriano concession to Tajra and two partners from TV Clube, and then giving the concession to João Lobo.

TV Clube offered dated equipment for TV Alvorada for many years, since the station's inception. Before its foundation, TV Clube had a repeater in Floriano that frequently lost its signal, receiving complaints, especially when the telenovelas were airing. The main justification for the concession was the fact that Floriano was an economic hub within the state and that at the time it was not able to relay the Globo signal properly.

In August 1996, a team from Rede Globo was already training and selecting the professionals who would take over journalism at TV Alvorada. Ultimately, the goal was to turn some of its staff, who knew nothing about television, to learn how to do basic work for television. The first television station in the interior of Piauí, the second station affiliated with Rede Globo in the state, was inaugurated on 10 January 1997, the year of Floriano's centenary, replacing the signal from the TV Clube repeater. Created by senator João Lobo in partnership with the Alencar family, it is made up of several departments: commercial, editorial, studio and journalistic. The first program aired by the new station was Piauí TV's 2nd edition presented by Nilson Ferreira. This edition began with a brief speech by the presenter:

Today, the city of Floriano definitively assumes control of TV Alvorada do Sul. Our television news department, guided by the Globo Quality Standard, has a single goal: to serve the community with information and record the history of the city in its daily life. We want your partnership, viewer. We are a media outlet with no political-partisan proposal. Our policy is the one that guides all of Rede Globo de Televisão’s production. We are the youngest of the affiliates, and from now on, we will listen and speak to the entire population of this immense southern region of the state. Our team's first work is coming on air. (Note: Original Portuguese narration: "A cidade de Floriano assume hoje em definitivo o comando da TV Alvorada do Sul. Nosso departamento de telejornalismo, orientado pelo Padrão Globo de Qualidade, tem um só objetivo: servir a comunidade com informações e registrar a história da cidade no seu dia-a-dia. Queremos a sua parceria, telespectador. Somos um veículo de comunicação sem proposta político-partidária. A nossa política é aquela que norteia toda a produção da Rede Globo de Televisão. Somos a caçula das afiliadas, e a partir de agora, vamos ouvir e falar com toda a população dessa imensa região sul do estado. Está entrando no ar o primeiro trabalho de nossa gente.")

which was followed by a report by Virgínia Fabris on the history and facets of the city. In an initial phase, only PITV's second edition was produced locally, while also being tape-delayed, its first presenter was Virginia Fabris; six months later, PITV's first edition began, which aired live.

PITV was the station's main program, produced and shown until 2019 with a set based on the former NETV studio of TV Globo Pernambuco in Recife. The station initially didn't produce the first edition at noon, due to lack of motivation and resources, initially relaying the Teresina edition with reports coming from Floriano. In the 2000s, the slot of the first edition was taken by PITV Convida, an interview show.

The station also became a school for journalism professionals: reporters, presenters, cameramen, editors and producers. Many people who eventually worked for larger stations in Brasília (Luís Carlos, who moved to Record Brasília), Teresina (Inês Saraiva, who moved to TV Antena 10), Natal (Emerson Moraes, who moved to InterTV Cabugi) and other large centers first went through TV Alvorada.

Floriano's commercial life has also changed a lot since TV Alvorada went on air. The station has already been awarded several times as a highlight in sales in the Northeast Region. In 2013, local retailer JR Variedades got a boost in its income thanks to a year-end campaign that aired on commercial breaks on the channel. The station also had a key role in local elections, airing its local campaigns and producing special programs. The first such program was for the 2000 elections. The segment Batendo na Tecla (Hitting the Key) insisted in local problems, which were often solved. There was also O Nosso Bairro (Our Neighborhood), about community problems, Artistas da Terra (Local Artists), revealing local stars such as Sandro, which in 2007 became the vocalist of Conexão. Retrospectiva (Retrospective), the annual year in review program, came alongside the annual blooper reel. Técnicos e Técnicas (Technicians) raised interest to the work market. Mesa de Bar aired on Carnaval Saturday and was copied by TV Clube Teresina. By the mid-2000s, there was Personalidades de Floriano, inside PITV Convida, which aired on Saturdays in place of the first edition.

By 2006, the station improved its technological infrastructure, replacing the U-matic system with digital DVCAM cameras. Footage editing was now possible using commercials,

In 2011, the station went through a period of expansion and modernization. The installation of a modern transmitter improved image quality and range. The signal reaches 80 km and is already picked up in the nearest municipalities. It was also in June of the same year that TV Alvorada started transmitting the signal via satellite. An evolution that allowed the immediate generation of reports and since 25 November 2011, live entries from Floriano on Piauí TV 1st edition on Rede Clube's programming. From this point on, the TV Alvorada signal started reaching several other municipalities in Piauí, thanks to satellite transmission. The station reaches Floriano, the Maranhão municipality of Barão de Grajaú and another 39 municipalities under the responsibility of TV Alvorada. As of January 2012, twelve municipalities already had its signal available: Amarante, Rio Grande, São Francisco do Piauí, Colônia do Piauí, Ipiranga, Dom Expedito Lopes, São José do Piauí, Fronteiras, Pio IX, São Julião, Alagoinha and Monsenhor Hipólito. The goal was to cover nineteen further municipalities by the end of the month, and all 39 municipalities by the time of the 2014 FIFA World Cup.

In 2012, TV Alvorada was unified with TV Clube in the capital and started using the same logo as the Teresina broadcaster to form Rede Clube, but the broadcaster only came under the control of Sistema Clube from 2013 onwards.

TV Alvorada has been operating in the same building since 1997, a building that has had no external renovations and has had the same facade since its foundation, and much of the equipment is still from that time, which means that the only news program generated by the station is not shown. in Full HD. TV Alvorada also has problems with lack of sponsorship, the broadcaster's commercial breaks are filled with bulletins from Globo Rural, advertisements from Som Livre and some advertisements from Rede Clube, with rare local sponsorship. The station also suffers from transmission issues in other municipalities in its coverage area. Only Floriano, Barão de Grajaú and nearby cities receive the signal via digital channel 6.1, while other cities such as Oeiras and Picos (the largest city in its coverage area) only receive the analog signal and are not decently reached by TV Alvorada's news department, which only sends reporters to cities close to Floriano. So much so that in Picos, the majority of viewers use subscription satellite TV to watch TV Clube.

On 3 April 2019, the station's broadcasting tower was struck by lightning, generating an electrical discharge that burned several pieces of equipment (including its electrical power clock, which exploded, leaving it without power), and burning the transmitter, taking the station off the air. The problem was reversed after 2 hours, a power generator was activated and the station returned to the air, but Floriano's Piauí TV 2nd edition was cancelled. One day later, on 4 April 2019, the station aired an edition of Piauí TV 2nd edition, recorded and edited on a common computer, explaining to viewers what happened, and informing that the news program will go off the air until they solved the problem. After the events, Piauí TV's 2nd edition of Floriano went off the air, giving way to the Teresina edition of the news program. On 16 April 2019, Piauí TV 2nd local edition returned to the air, but with many improvisations: without a teleprompter in the first few days, the presenters read the texts using a notebook and the station's character generator (which was also damaged) did not work. It was used again until the last news broadcast carried out by the station.

On 26 October 2019, the last Piauí TV 2nd edition generated locally by TV Alvorada aired. Rede Clube closed the station's local production and took a decision similar to that taken in 2006 by Rede Liberal and in 2017 by Rede Mirante, making it a mere producer of reports and live links to Teresina. Since 26 October, the station has shown the Teresina edition of the news program.

== Technical information ==
!Virtual !! Digital channel !! Aspect ratio !! Content |- |6.1 |25 UHF |1080i |TV Alvorada/Globo programming |} TV Alvorada started digital broadcasts on 19 February 2016. The launch of the digital signal was held at Hotel Rio Parnaíba with the participation of local figures and advertisers.

TV Alvorada closed its analog signal on 1 July 2025, coinciding with the second phase of the federal analog switch-off roadmap. Ten of the eighteen transmitters servced by the station already have digital signals installed, while the remaining eight must depend on TVRO dishes for reception.
