= TV Antares =

- Teresina, Piauí; Brazil
- Channels: Digital: 24 (UHF); Virtual: 2
- Branding: TV Antares

Programming
- Affiliations: TV Brasil

Ownership
- Owner: Fundação Antares; (Fundação Rádio & Televisão Educativa do Piauí)
- Sister stations: Rádio Antares AM; TV Delta; TV Picos

History
- First air date: August 1986
- Former channel numbers: Analog: 2 (VHF, 1986–2018)
- Former affiliations: TV Cultura (1993–2004); TVE Brasil (1986–2007)

Technical information
- Licensing authority: ANATEL
- ERP: 3.6 kW
- Transmitter coordinates: 5°6′36.8″S 42°47′51.1″W

Links
- Public license information: Profile
- Website: fundacaoantares.pi.gov.br

TV Antares (channel 2) is a TV Brasil-affiliated educational television station licensed to Teresina, capital of the state of Piauí. It is owned by Fundação Antares, itself managed by the state government, that controls the Piauían public radio and television stations.

== History ==
The station's history dates back to 11 June 1985, date in which the Cabinet of Brazil declared the foundation of Fundação de Apoio ao Desenvolvimento do Estado do Piauí - FADEP - through Decree nº 91,316, where it was provided a license to operate an educational television station. FADEP later got a separate permit (Decree nº 92,372) on 6 February 1986. In May 1986, the TV e Rádio Educativa do Piauí building was inaugurated at Valter Alencar Avenue (the namesake was the founder of TV Clube and was involved in educational media before.

With the passing of Ordinary Law nº 4,178 on 30 December 1987, the FADEP organ Centro de Teleducação went defunct and Fundação Antares was created. New programs were created, in a period ending in mid-1992. Such programs included À Queima Roupa (interviews, 1987–1989), Pulutrica (children's program on Saturday mornings, 1988–1992), Oitão da Casa Grande (regional culture, 1988–1992) and Encena (cultural program on Friday afternoons, 1988).

In March 1991, a new law at approved at the Legislative Assembly of Piauí (nº 4,382) put an end to Fundação Antares; the station was renamed TV Piauí as a consequence. At this period, it assisted in the construction permit of TV Delta in Parnaíba. TV Piauí was replaced by virtue of Complementary Law nº 030 in July 2003 by Fundação Rádio e Televisão Educativa do Piauí; then on 28 June 2006, the station was renamed TV Antares, under the mandate of governor Wellington Dias. New equipment was acquired; the first edition of Jornal Antares aired on 10 July 2006. Until 2010, the station produced thirteen programs.

On 27 July 2009, the station made its signal available free-to-air via the NSS-10 satellite (now Starone C2).

On 27 September, a relay station was installed in Esperantina, on channel 8; then on 28 October in Floriano, on channel 2.

In February 2010, like other stations, it ignored reports on UPFI wages.

In June 2010, Fundação Antares staff threatened to enter a strike due to two months of unpaid wages. The staff accused Coordenadoria Estadual de Comunicação (CCOM), in charge of administering the foundation's radio and TV stations, of evading financial resources; the staff also made accusations against the state government.

== Technical information ==
Virtual	PSIP	Screen	Content
2.1	24 UHF	1080i	TV Antares/TV Brasil's main schedule.

TV Antares shut down its analog signal on 12 July 2018 (the same day as Teresina shut down analog TV) and flash-cut to digital TV by acquiring equipment and commencing tests; these broadcasts became regular on 17 December 2018.
