= Nossa Senhora de Nazaré =

Nossa Senhora de Nazaré or da Nazaré may refer to:

- Nossa Senhora da Nazaré, a colonial church in Luanda, Angola
- Nossa Senhora de Nazaré, Piauí, a municipality in the Northeast region of Brazil
