= Nossa Senhora dos Remédios =

Nossa Senhora dos Remédios may refer to the following places:

- Nossa Senhora dos Remédios (Povoação), Azores
- Nossa Senhora dos Remédios, Piauí, Brazil
