= Francelino Pereira =

Brazilian politician

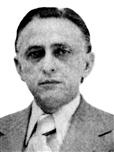
Pereira in the 1960s

Francelino Pereira dos Santos (2 July 1921 – 21 December 2017) was a Brazilian politician. From 1995 to 2003, he was a member of the Federal Senate. He served as Governor of Minas Gerais from 1979 to 1983 and as Deputy from 1963 to 1979. He was also the president of the National Renewal Alliance during the 1970s.

Pereira was born on 2 July 1921 in Angical do Piauí. He died of natural causes at the age of 96 on 21 December 2017 in Belo Horizonte.
