= List of metropolitan areas in Brazil =

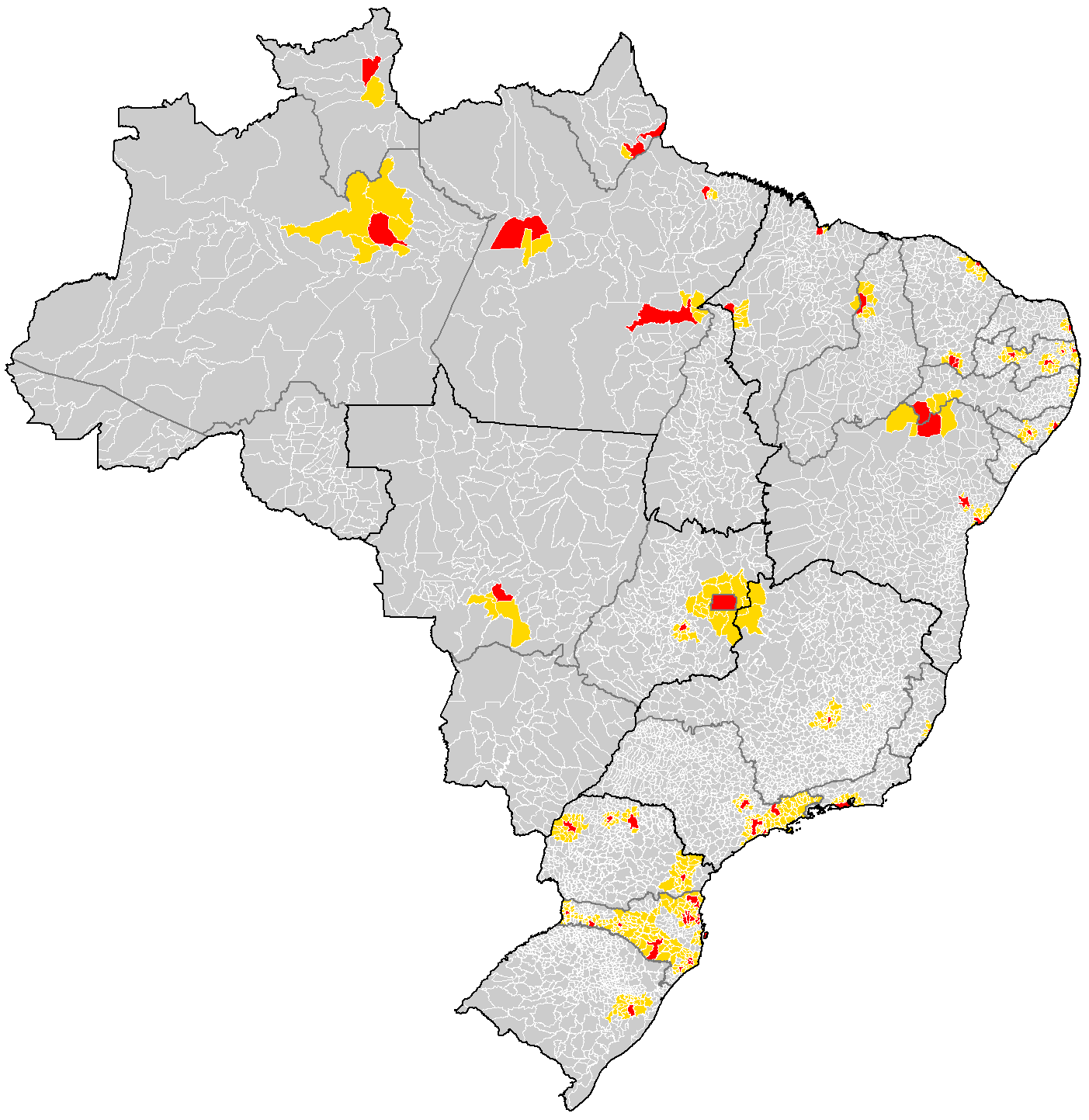
Map of metropolitan areas and urban agglomerations in Brazil as of 2012. Municipalities in red refer to metropolitan capitals and the ones in yellow refer to expansion or conurbation area.

This is a list of the metropolitan areas in Brazil, containing the legally defined metropolitan areas with more than one million inhabitants in Brazil, according to estimates published by IBGE.

== Definitions ==
In Brazil, the terms metropolitan area (Portuguese: região metropolitana) and urban agglomeration (aglomeração urbana) have specific meanings. They are defined by federal and state legislation as collections of municipalities focused on "integrating the organization, planning and execution of public functions of common interest". An integrated development area (região integrada de desenvolvimento) is one of the two above structures that crosses state (or Federal District) boundaries.

Because these regions are formed by consent of municipalities, their composition can change over time due to municipal reorganization. These regions may not coincide exactly with boundaries of statistical Immediate Geographic Areas (formerly microregions) defined by IBGE, or with the broader definition of built-up urban area.

== List ==
| Metropolitan area | Region | State | Population estimate (2019) | Population (2017) | Population (2016) | Change (2016-7) | Type |
|---|---|---|---|---|---|---|---|
| São Paulo | Southeast | São Paulo | 21,734,682 | 21,391,624 | 21,242,939 | +0.7% | metropolitan area |
| Rio de Janeiro | Southeast | Rio de Janeiro | 12,763,459 | 12,377,505 | 12,330,186 | +0.4% | metropolitan area |
| Belo Horizonte | Southeast | Minas Gerais | 5,961,895 | 5,915,536 | 5,873,841 | +0.7% | metropolitan area |
| Brasília | Central-West | Distrito Federal, Goiás, Minas Gerais | 4,627,771 | 4,366,901 | 4,284,676 | +1.9% | integrated development area |
| Porto Alegre | South | Rio Grande do Sul | 4,340,733 | 4,293,050 | 4,276,475 | +0.4% | metropolitan area |
| Fortaleza | Northeast | Ceará | 4,106,245 | 4,051,744 | 4,019,213 | +0.8% | metropolitan area |
| Recife | Northeast | Pernambuco | 4,079,575 | 3,965,699 | 3,940,456 | +0.6% | metropolitan area |
| Salvador | Northeast | Bahia | 3,929,209 | 4,015,205 | 3,984,583 | +0.8% | metropolitan area |
| Curitiba | South | Paraná | 3,654,960 | 3,572,326 | 3,537,894 | +1.0% | metropolitan area |
| Campinas | Southeast | São Paulo | 3,264,915 | 3,168,019 | 3,131,528 | +1.2% | metropolitan area |
| Manaus | North | Amazonas | 2,676,936 | 2,612,747 | 2,568,817 | +1.7% | metropolitan area |
| Goiânia | Central-West | Goiás | 2,560,625 | 2,493,792 | 2,458,504 | +1.4% | metropolitan area |
| Vale do Paraíba e Litoral Norte | Southeast | São Paulo | 2,552,610 | 2,497,857 | 2,475,879 | +0.9% | metropolitan area |
| Belém | North | Pará | 2,510,274 | 2,441,761 | 2,422,481 | +0.8% | metropolitan area |
| Sorocaba | Southeast | São Paulo | 2,143,789 | 2,088,381 | 1,908,425 | +9.4% | metropolitan area |
| Vitória | Southeast | Espírito Santo | 1,979,337 | 1,960,213 | 1,935,483 | +1.3% | metropolitan area |
| Baixada Santista | Southeast | São Paulo | 1,865,397 | 1,828,212 | 1,813,033 | +0.8% | metropolitan area |
| Ribeirão Preto | Southeast | São Paulo | 1,720,469 | 1,678,910 | 1,662,645 | +1.0% | metropolitan area |
| São Luís | Northeast | Maranhão | 1,633,117 | 1,619,377 | 1,605,305 | +0.9% | metropolitan area |
| Natal | Northeast | Rio Grande do Norte | 1,604,067 | 1,596,104 | 1,537,211 | +3.8% | metropolitan area |
| Piracicaba | Southeast | São Paulo | 1,495,220 | 1,464,993 | 1,452,691 | +0.8% | metropolitan area |
| Norte e Nordeste Catarinense | South | Santa Catarina | 1,419,518 | 1,383,456 | 1,363,854 | +1.4% | metropolitan area |
| Maceió | Northeast | Alagoas | 1,310,520 | 1,352,241 | 1,314,254 | +2.9% | metropolitan area |
| João Pessoa | Northeast | Paraíba | 1,278,401 | 1,282,227 | 1,268,360 | +1.1% | metropolitan area |
| Teresina | Northeast | Piauí, Maranhão | 1,223,902 | 1,204,397 | 1,199,941 | +0.4% | integrated development area |
| Florianópolis | South | Santa Catarina | 1,209,818 | 1,172,076 | 1,152,115 | +1.7% | metropolitan area |
| Londrina | South | Paraná | 1,111,577 | 1,094,347 | 1,085,479 | +0.8% | metropolitan area |
| Vale do Rio Cuiabá | Central-West | Mato Grosso | 1,041,307 | 1,005,690 | 998,174 | +0.8% | metropolitan area |

== See also ==
- List of cities in Brazil by population
- Municipalities of Brazil
- List of municipalities of Brazil
- List of largest cities in Brazil by state
- List of metropolitan areas in the Americas
- Largest cities in the Americas
- Brazilian Institute of Geography and Statistics
