= TV Delta =

- Parnaíba, Piauí; Brazil
- Channels: Digital: 42 (UHF); Virtual: 2
- Branding: TV Delta

Programming
- Affiliations: TV Brasil

Ownership
- Owner: Fundação Antares

History
- First air date: June 1992
- Former channel numbers: Analog: 2 (VHF, 1992–2019)
- Former affiliations: TV Cultura (1992-2004); TVE Brasil (2004-2007)

Technical information
- Licensing authority: ANATEL
- ERP: 0.33 kW
- Transmitter coordinates: 2°55′3.5″S 41°45′23″W

Links
- Public license information: Profile
- Website: fundacaoantares.pi.gov.br/tvdelta.php

TV Delta (channel 2) is a TV Brasil-affiliated television station licensed to Parnaíba, a city in northern Piauí. The station is owned by Fundação Antares, also owner of TV Antares in Teresina.

== History ==
TV Delta was established in 1992 as TV Educativa de Parnaíba; the launch coincided with TV Piauí (as Fundação Antares was then called) assisted in its construction permit. In the late 90s, the station suffered financial problems and went silent.

The station resumed operations on 2 June 2006 under the new name TV Delta, shortly before TV Antares resumed its operations.

On 9 January 2019, TV Delta fell silent again due to the shutdown of analog television in Parnaíba and environs. TV Delta was due to receive digital equipment in 2018, when its parent station TV Antares in Teresina was scheduled to make its digital tests. When Antares started digital broadcasts on 17 December 2018, just before the Parnaíba deadline, the foundation was waiting for a financial greenlight. Since the station could not convert to digital on time, the station fired 13 staff on the shutdown date. The agreement initially stipulated that the sacked staff would continue working until the start of digital broadcasts. TV Delta started broadcasting its digital service only in 2022 on virtual channel 2.1; 2.2 is used since at least November 2022 to carry a simulcast of Rádio Antares from Teresina.
