= Elvira Fernández–Almoguera Casas =

Spanish lawyer

Elvira Fernández–Almoguera Casas (Herencia, Ciudad Real, 20 August 1907 - Albacete, 14 August 1938) was a Spanish lawyer. She was the first woman to join the Albacete Bar as a lawyer, and the first one that had a position at the public attorney.

== Biography ==
Elvira Fernández-Almoguera Casas was born on 20 August 1907 in Herencia (Ciudad Real). She was the oldest of four siblings. She died in Albacete on 14 August 1938 of cardiac arrest.

She attended high school at “Bachiller Sabuco” in Albacete, graduating on 1 September 1924.

Fernández-Almoguera enrolled first as “Non oficial”, in the Department of Law and Social Sciences of the University of Murcia in two different periods, a preparatory one and the degree stage. She also enrolled in 1924-25 at the Science Department of the Central University of Madrid, although she did not complete those studies, and devoted her time exclusively to Law. In that period, she was living at the Residencia de Señoritas of Madrid, located at 30 Fortuny Street.

After obtaining her degree at the Central University of Madrid, Fernández-Almoguera joined the Albacete Bar in 1929, becoming the first woman to do so (there was no other female lawyer at that bar until 26 January 1970). She had her office at the commercial gallery Pasaje de Lodares. She provided legal aid for people without resources, both in criminal affairs and on civil affairs.

After the coup of July 1936, she actively join as a replacement public attorney, both in the new bodies of the Justice administration set up as a consequences of the war in an area which was still loyal to the Republic, as well as in the Territorial Audience of Albacete, until she died. The Spanish Civil War gave women the opportunity to participate in positions that had been, until then, prohibited for women, as it was the case for the public attorney. The Second Spanish Republic ignored this rule to provide resources to all bodies of the Justice Administration, authorising “the Justice Department to appoint, on an interim basis, civil servants for the judicial and public attorney offices, in whichever categories”.

She was appointed interim public attorney of the Popular Tribunal of Granada (located in Baza), assuming the position on 29 May 1937, becoming the first public attorney female in Spain. In 1938 she moved to the Territorial Audience of Albacete, where she stayed until her sudden death.

During the 1930s, she was active in the political life of the Albacete province, as a member of Unión Republicana.

She also worked for the Socorro Rojo Internacional, where she became President for Albacete.

== Awards ==
The town hall of Herencia paid tribute to Elvira Fernández-Almoguera Casas, giving her name to the official site of the Juzgado de Paz.
