= Joaquín Arderíus =

Joaquín Arderíus y Sánchez Fortún (May 5, 1885, Lorca, in Murcia – January 20, 1969, Mexico City) was a Spanish experimental and political novelist.

Arderíus studied in Madrid before taking engineering courses at the University of Liège. He abandoned these studies to dedicate himself to literature and leftist politics, and was jailed many times for his revolutionary activities during the dictatorship of Miguel Primo de Rivera. In 1927, Arderíus founded the very successful periodical Oriente. He was co-editor, together with Antonio Espina and José Díaz Fernández, of the political periodical Nueva España from 1930 to 1931, with an initial print run of 40,000 copies. In 1929, he became affiliated with the Communist Party of Spain, but after 1933, he became aligned with the Republican Left.

His novels include: Mis mendigos (1915); the Nietzschean Así me fecundó Zaratustra (1923); the erotic Yo y tres mujeres ("I and Three Women") (1924); La duquesa de Nit (1926); La espuela (1927); Los príncipes iguales (1928); Justo (1929), a satire on Roman Catholicism; El comedor de la pensión Venecia (1930); the political Campesinos (1931), and Crimen (1934). With José Díaz Fernández, he wrote Vida de Fermín Galán ("Life of Fermín Galán") (1931).

During the Spanish Civil War, he served as president of the Antifascist organization Socorro Rojo Internacional, composed of unions, workers’ organizations, and leftist political parties, which supported the Republican cause against Francisco Franco. Arderíus went into exile in 1939, first to France and then Mexico, after Adolf Hitler's occupation of Paris. He worked for the embassy of the Spanish Republic there, and later in the Mexican Ministry of National Education. During his exile, he abandoned the writing of novels and instead wrote a biography of Don Juan de Austria.

Though they were considered too difficult to be commercially successful, Arderíus’ novels are currently being reexamined for their influence on other anti-Franco modernists and post-modernist novelists. He died in Mexico City at age 83

== Sources ==
- Biography (in Spanish)
- V. Fuentes, «De la novela expresionista a la revolucionaria proletaria: en tomo a la narrativa de J . Arderius», en Papeles de Son Armadans, CL.XXIX (Feb 1971), pp. 197–215;
- M. F. Vilches de Frutos, «El subjetivismo como constante vital: la trayectoria literaria de J. Arderius», en Dicenda. Cuadernos de Filología Hispánica, III (1984), pp. 141–161.
- Rosemary Goring (editor), Larousse Dictionary of Writers (1994), p. 36.
