= Boqueirão do Piauí =

Coordinates: 4.48694°S 42.0739°W

- Municipality
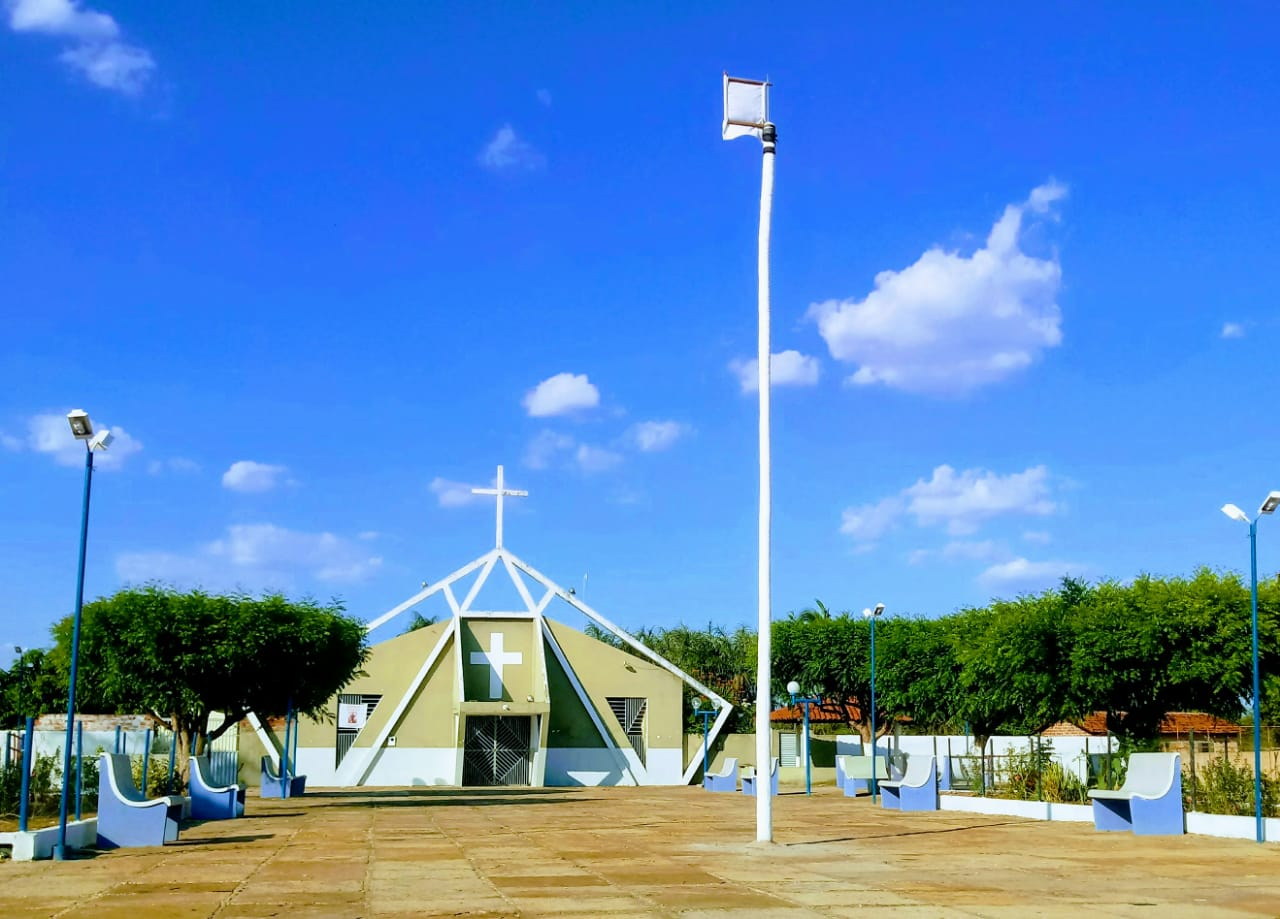

- Country: Brazil
- Region: Northeast
- State: Piauí
- Mesoregion: Centro-Norte Piauiense

Population (2020)
  - Total: 6,426
- Time zone: UTC−3 (BRT)

Boqueirão do Piauí is a municipality in the state of Piauí in the Northeast region of Brazil.

== See also ==
- List of municipalities in Piauí
