= International Red Aid =

International communist social-services organization

- Logo of the International Organisation for Assistance to Fighters for Revolution (MOPR), the Soviet section of the International Red Aid

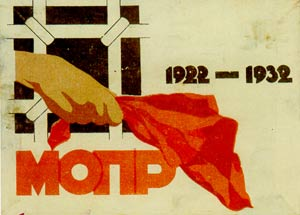
- MOPR poster from 1932
- Founded: 1922
- Founder: Communist International
- Dissolved: 1941 (Soviet affiliate – 1947)
- Purpose: "Assistance in the creation of organizations to render material and moral aid to all captives of capitalism in prison."
- Region served: Worldwide
- Key people: Julian Marchlewski; Clara Zetkin; Elena Stasova

International Red Aid (also commonly known by its Russian acronym MOPR) was an international social-service organization. MOPR was founded in 1922 by the Communist International to function as an "international political Red Cross", providing material and moral aid to radical "class-war" political prisoners around the world.

== Organizational history ==
=== Formation ===
The International Workers Aid society, known colloquially by its Russian-language acronym, MOPR, was established in 1922 in response to the directive of the 4th World Congress of the Comintern to appeal to all communist parties "to assist in the creation of organizations to render material and moral aid to all captives of capitalism in prison."

Julian Marchlewski-Karski was named chairman of the Central Committee of MOPR, the governing body of the new organization. After 1924, the name of this directing body was changed to the executive committee.

The first plenary session of the Central Committee of MOPR was held in June 1923 in Moscow. At this gathering it was determined that MOPR should establish sections in all countries, particularly those suffering from the White Terror against the revolutionary movement.

=== Development ===
The first international conference of MOPR took place in July 1924, simultaneously with the 5th World Congress of the Comintern.

According to Elena Stasova, the head of the Russian section of MOPR and deputy head of the Central Committee of the International organization, as of January 1, 1928, MOPR had a total membership of 8,900,000 people in 44 national sections. By January 1, 1931, MOPR's scope had grown to 58 national organizations, with a total membership of 8,305,454, according to Stasova. At the latter date the international organization maintained a total of 56 periodicals in 19 languages, Stasova stated.

Stasova noted that two forms of the organization existed, "mass organizations" — such as those of the USSR, Germany, France, the United States — and "organizations of a committee type", which limited themselves to legal and material aid to political prisoners and their families without attempting to establish large-scale membership organizations.

Stasova emphasized the ongoing difference between MOPR and Workers International Relief, another branch of the Comintern's international apparatus. "The difference is this", she noted in 1931, "we are assisting the political prisoners and the Workers International Relief assists at the time of economic strikes, at the time of the economic struggle."

The 1st World Congress of MOPR was held in November 1932. At that gathering it was announced that as of January 1 of that year, MOPR had established 67 national sections outside of the USSR, with 1,278,274 members.

=== Termination ===
MOPR was headed by Elena Stasova until 1937, after which time its international character was deemphasized.

== National histories ==
As of 1924, the organization had national affiliates in nineteen countries. By 1932, it claimed sixty-two affiliates (excluding the Soviet Union) with a total of 1,278,274 individual members.

=== Spain ===
The International Red Aid made its first appearance in Spain as a charity organization during the workers' revolt of October 1934 in Asturias. It provided aid to those imprisoned for their role in the rebellion, and organized amnesty campaigns for prisoners that were to be executed.

The organization, which included many artists and writers, was later re-formed and expanded in Barcelona in January 1936, with the aim of opposing fascism on multiple fronts.

==== Activities during the Spanish Civil War ====
SRI poster in Catalan language. Text reads 'Anti-Fascists: Think of those who struggle!'

During the Spanish Civil War, the writer Joaquín Arderíus served as the organization's president before exiling himself to France and then Mexico. The SRI (Socorro Rojo Internacional) created soup kitchens and refugee camps throughout the territory controlled by the Republicans, and also provided libraries for Republican soldiers, but many of their programs; as well as the food and aid that it collected- were focused on providing aid for children. For example, the SRI founded the Escuela Nacional para Niños Anormales (National School for Mentally Disabled Children) in Madrid, with 150 students. It also founded a Children's Park on the outskirts of Madrid, providing shelter to an additional 150 children.

Other activities included:

- The building of transportation networks between hospitals and the front.
- The transformation of various buildings (convents, churches, palaces) into makeshift hospitals, clinics, blood banks, orphanages, and schools.

Medical contributions included the establishment of 275 hospitals, ambulance services, the establishment of the Orthodontics Clinic and College, dental hygiene campaigns, and the mobilization of dentists to the front. The Workers' Party of Marxist Unification (POUM), a minor Marxist party in Spain at the time, organized a parallel Socorro Rojo del P.O.U.M. in opposition to the International Red Aid.

==== Military activities ====
The ranks of the Fifth Regiment (dissolved 21 January 1937), established by the Communist Party of Spain at the outbreak of the Civil War, were also swelled by members of the SRI. The Fifth Regiment, based on the Soviet Red Army, included Juan Modesto and Enrique Líster amongst its leaders, and fought primarily in the battles in and around Madrid throughout 1936. The SRI also helped Communist sympathizers in Nationalist Spain make their way to friendly territory.

The insignia of the SRI consisted of an "S" (for Socorro) behind the bars of a prison.

=== Netherlands ===
The Dutch section of International Red Aid held its first congress in 1926. The same year it began publishing Rode Hulp.

=== Finland ===
The Red Aid of Finland was active during the 1930s, led by the Communist Party of Finland. It gave assistance to revolutionary prisoners in Finnish jails. Women connected to Red Aid would make handicraft works and organized bazaars, in order to finance the activities of the organization. The organization also tried to mobilize public opinion against ill-treatment of the prisoners. The Red Aid of Finland published Vankien Toveri.

=== Latin America ===
Towards the ends of the 1920s, Farabundo Martí became the leader of the International Red Aid in Latin America. Julio Antonio Mella, the Cuban communist leader exiled in Mexico since 1926, was a leading figure in the Mexican section of the organization.

=== Soviet Union ===
The largest section of MOPR was its Soviet branch, which accounted for the majority of the organization's international membership. MOPR organized numerous lotteries and fundraising drives.

=== Korea ===
Yi Donghwi was a prominent MOPR organizer.

=== Madagascar ===
A MOPR branch was formed in Madagascar in 1933.

=== Poland ===
The membership of the Polish branch of the MOPR was 90% Jewish in 1932 out of its 6,000 members.

== Leadership ==
- Julian Marchlewski (1922–1925).
- Panteleimon Lepeshinsky (1925–1927).
- Elena Stasova (1927–1937).
- Prominent figures of the MOPR included Vincas Mickevičius-Kapsukas, Clara Zetkin, Sen Katayama, Wilhelm Pieck and others.

== Congresses of MOPR ==
Year	Name	Location	Dates	Delegates
1923	1st Plenary Session of the CC of MOPR	Moscow	June	
1924	1st International Conference	Moscow	July 14–16	109 (91 CP, 13 YCI, 5 non-party)
1927	2nd International Conference	Moscow	March 24-April 5	
1932	1st World Congress	Moscow	November	

== National Affiliates of MOPR ==
Principal source: James Martin Ryle, International Red Aid, 1922-1928, pp. 262-263.

Country	Group name	Establishment date	Comments
Albania			
Algeria		"before 1928"	
Argentina		1926	
Australia		1928	
Austria	Austrian Red Aid (Österreichische Rote Hilfe)	1924	
Belgium		Aug. 1925	
Bolivia		"before 1933"	
Brazil		1927	
British Guiana			
Bulgaria	Organization for Support to the Victims of the Capitalist Dictatorship	Sept. 1923	
Canada	Canadian Labour Defense League	Aug. 1925	
Chile		1930	
China	Society of Aid	Oct. 1925	
Colombia		1932	
Costa Rica		1932	
Cuba		1929	
Czechoslovakia		Feb. 1925	
Denmark		1923	
Ecuador		"before 1933"	
Egypt		1928	
El Salvador		"before 1933"	
Estonia		1923	
Finland	Finnish Red Aid (Suomen Punainen Apu)	1924	
Formosa		1930	
France	Secours Rouge International	1923	
Germany	Red Aid of Germany (Rote Hilfe Deutschlands)	Oct. 1924	
Great Britain	International Class War Prisoners' Aid	1925	
Greece	Workers' Aid	1923	
Guatemala		1928	
Haiti		1928	
Hawaii			
Hungary			
Iceland			
India		"after 1928"	
Indo-China			
Indonesia		1928	
Ireland		1928	
Isle of Timor		1933	
Italy		April 1923	
Japan	Nekon Sekishoku Kyuenkai	1928	
Java			
Korea		Jan. 1926	
Latvia			
Lithuania	Lithuanian Red Aid	1918	
Madagascar		"before 1933"	
Mexico	League for Support of Persecuted Fighters	April 1925	
Mongolia		1928	
Morocco		1928	
Netherlands	Red Aid of Holland (Roode Hulp Holland)	Feb. 1925	
New Zealand		1928	
Norway	Norwegian Red Aid (Norges Roede Hjelp)		
Palestine		1924	
Panama		"before 1933"	
Persia		1928	
Peru		"before 1933"	
Philippines		"before 1933"	
Poland	Red Aid of Poland (Czerwona Pomoc w Polsce)	1925	
Portugal	Socorro Vermelho Internacional	1925	
Puerto Rico			
Romania			
South Africa	Ikaka la Basebenzi	1928	
Spain		Sept. 1925	
Sweden	International Red Aid, Swedish Section		
Switzerland		1923	
Syria		"before 1933"	
Trinidad			
Tunisia		1928	
Turkey			
United States of America	International Labor Defense	1925	
Uruguay		Feb. 1926	
Union of Soviet Socialist Republics	International Society for Aid to Revolutionary Fighters (MOPR)	1922	
Venezuela		1931	
Yugoslavia		March 1924	

== See also ==
- Anarchist Black Cross
- Elvira Fernández–Almoguera Casas
- International Association of Democratic Lawyers
- International Labor Defense
- Partisan Defense Committee
- Rote Hilfe e.V.
- Workers International Relief (aka Mezhrabpom), established by the Comintern in 1921 to channel international aid to Soviet Russia during the famine
