= Socorro Rojo del P.O.U.M. =

Socorro Rojo del P.O.U.M. poster

Poster in Catalan language, calling for support to Socorro Rojo

Socorro Rojo del P.O.U.M. ('POUM Red Aid') was a volunteer organization in Spain, active during the Spanish Civil War. The organization was set up by the Workers' Party of Marxist Unification (POUM), modelled after the Communist Party-led International Red Aid. All P.O.U.M. party members had to be members of the organization.

The Central Committee of the organization issued the monthly publication Socorro Rojo P.O.U.M. from Barcelona 1936–1937.
