= Lagoa do Piauí =

Coordinates: 5.415°S 42.6428°W

- Municipality
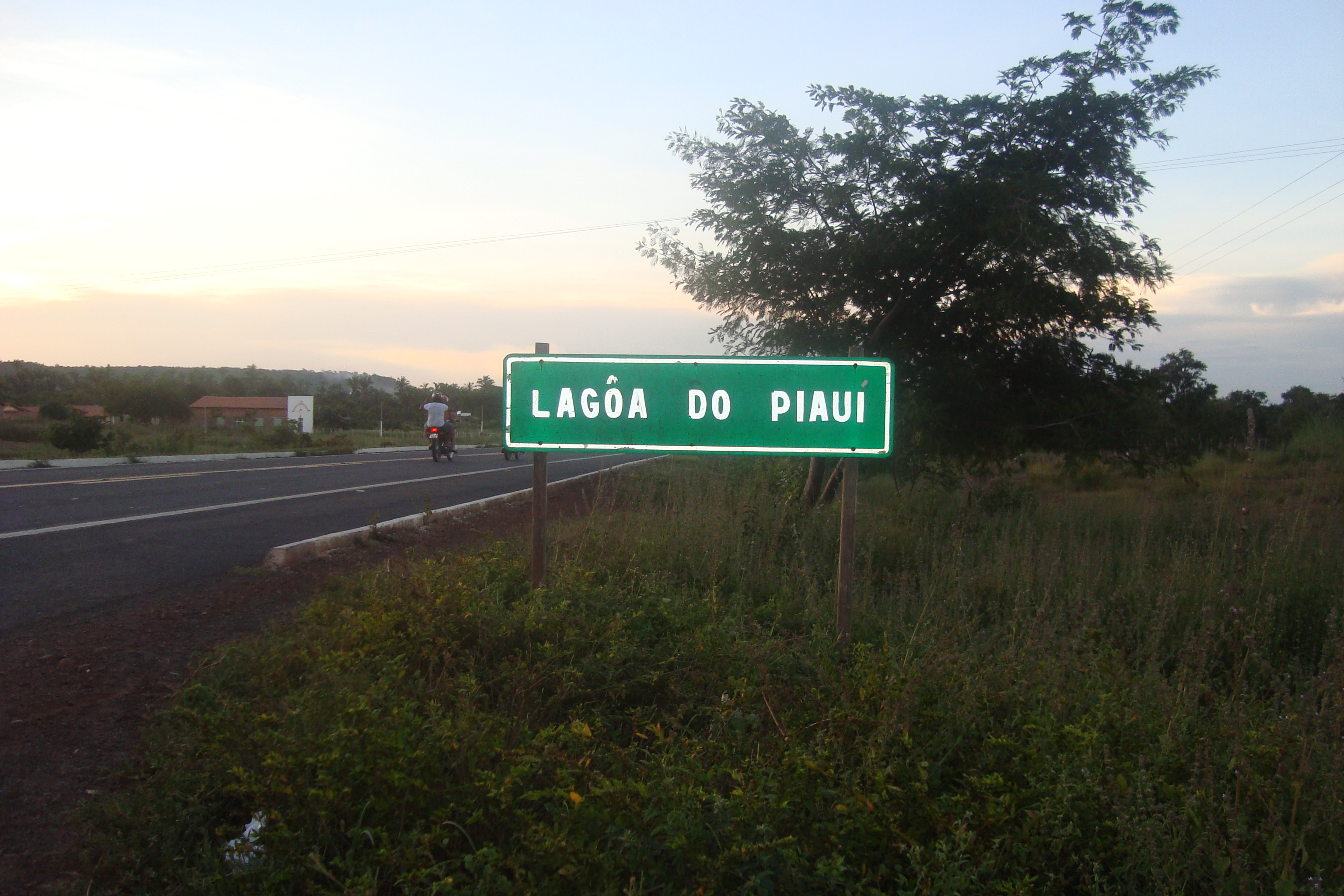

- Country: Brazil
- Region: Nordeste
- State: Piauí
- Mesoregion: Centro-Norte Piauiense

Population (2020)
  - Total: 4,075
- Time zone: UTC−3 (BRT)

Lagoa do Piauí is a municipality in the state of Piauí in the Northeast region of Brazil.

== See also ==
- List of municipalities in Piauí
