= Cabeceiras do Piauí =

- Municipality
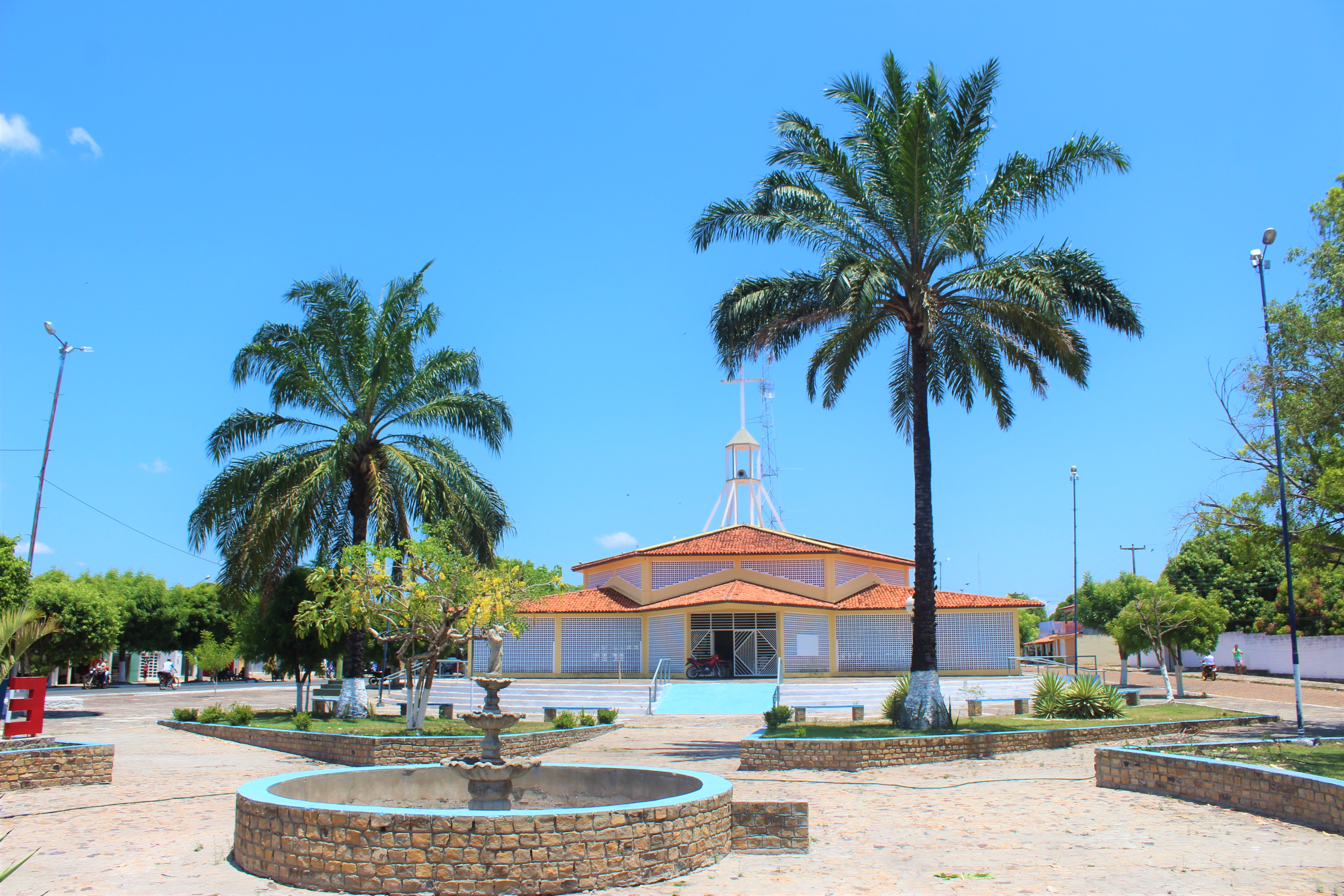

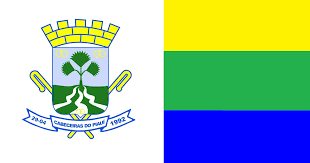
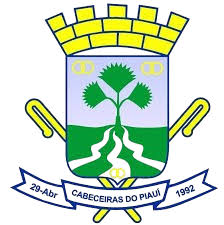
- Flag Coat of arms

- Location in Brazil
- Coordinates: 4.47583°S 42.3089°W
- Country: Brazil
- Region: Nordeste
- State: Piauí
- Mesoregion: Norte Piauiense

Population (2020)
  - Total: 10,630
- Time zone: UTC−3 (BRT)

Cabeceiras do Piauí is a municipality in the state of Piauí in the Northeast region of Brazil.

== See also ==
- List of municipalities in Piauí
