= Boa Hora =

Coordinates: 4.41083°S 42.0858°W

- Municipality
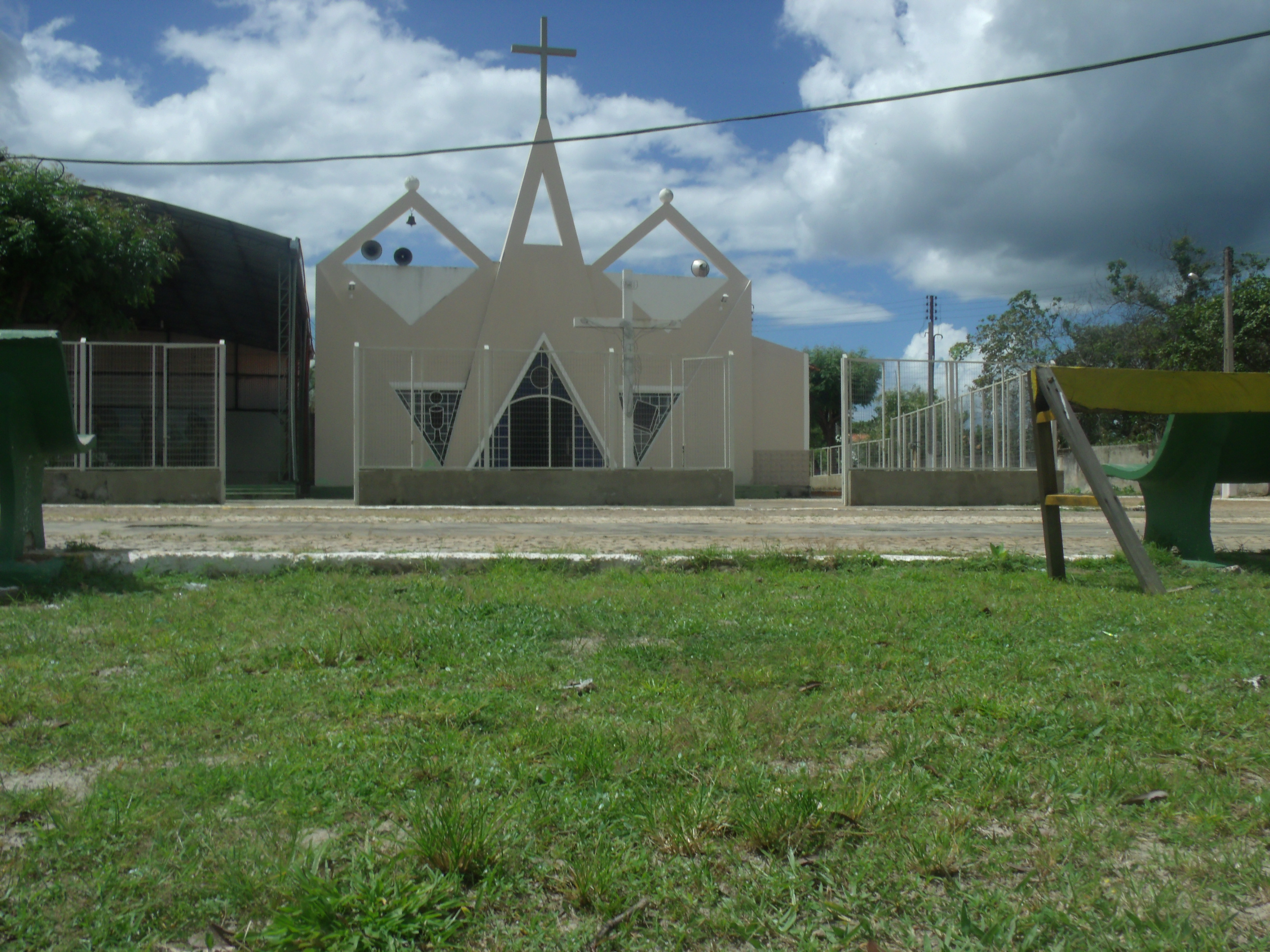

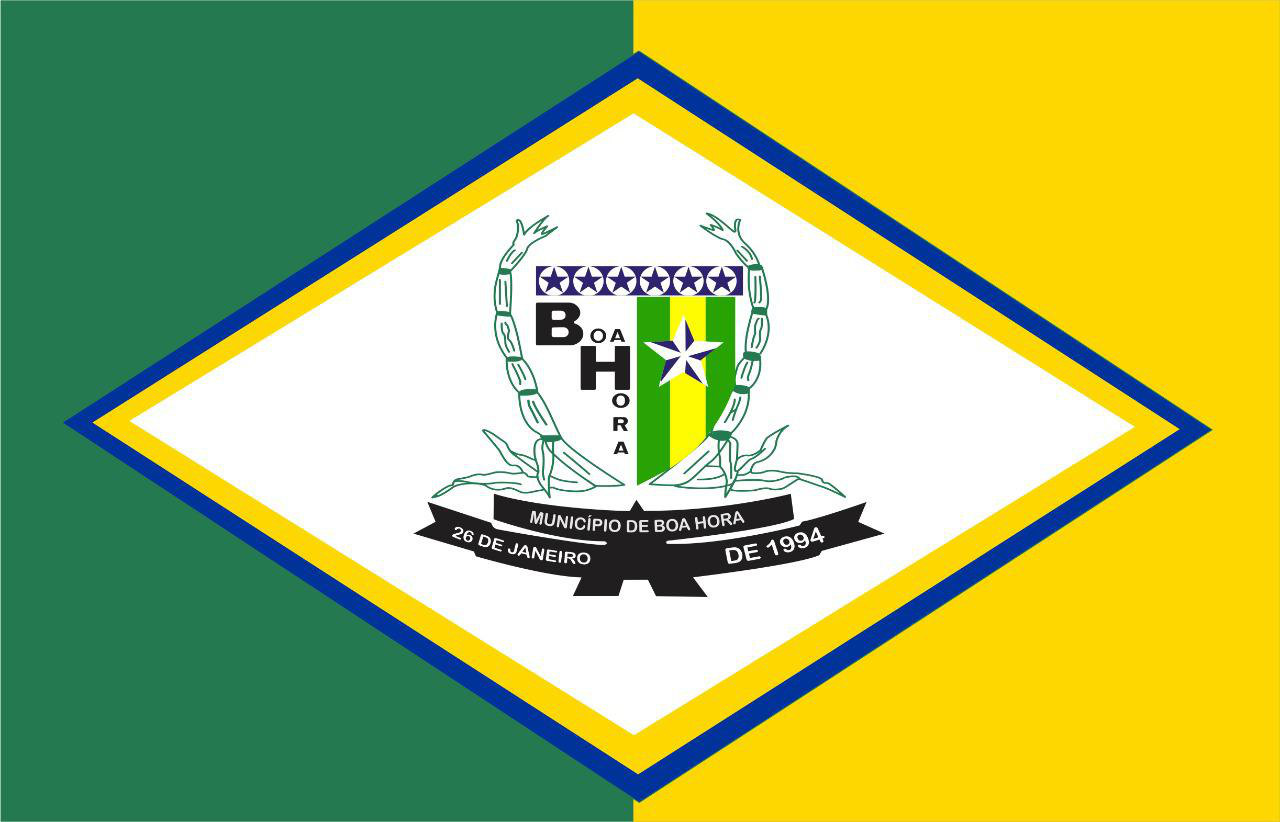
- Flag

- Country: Brazil
- Region: Nordeste
- State: Piauí
- Mesoregion: Norte Piauiense

Population (2020)
  - Total: 6,815
- Time zone: UTC−3 (BRT)

Boa Hora is a municipality in the state of Piauí in the Northeast region of Brazil.

== See also ==
- List of municipalities in Piauí
