= Floriano, Piauí =

Floriano
- Municipality
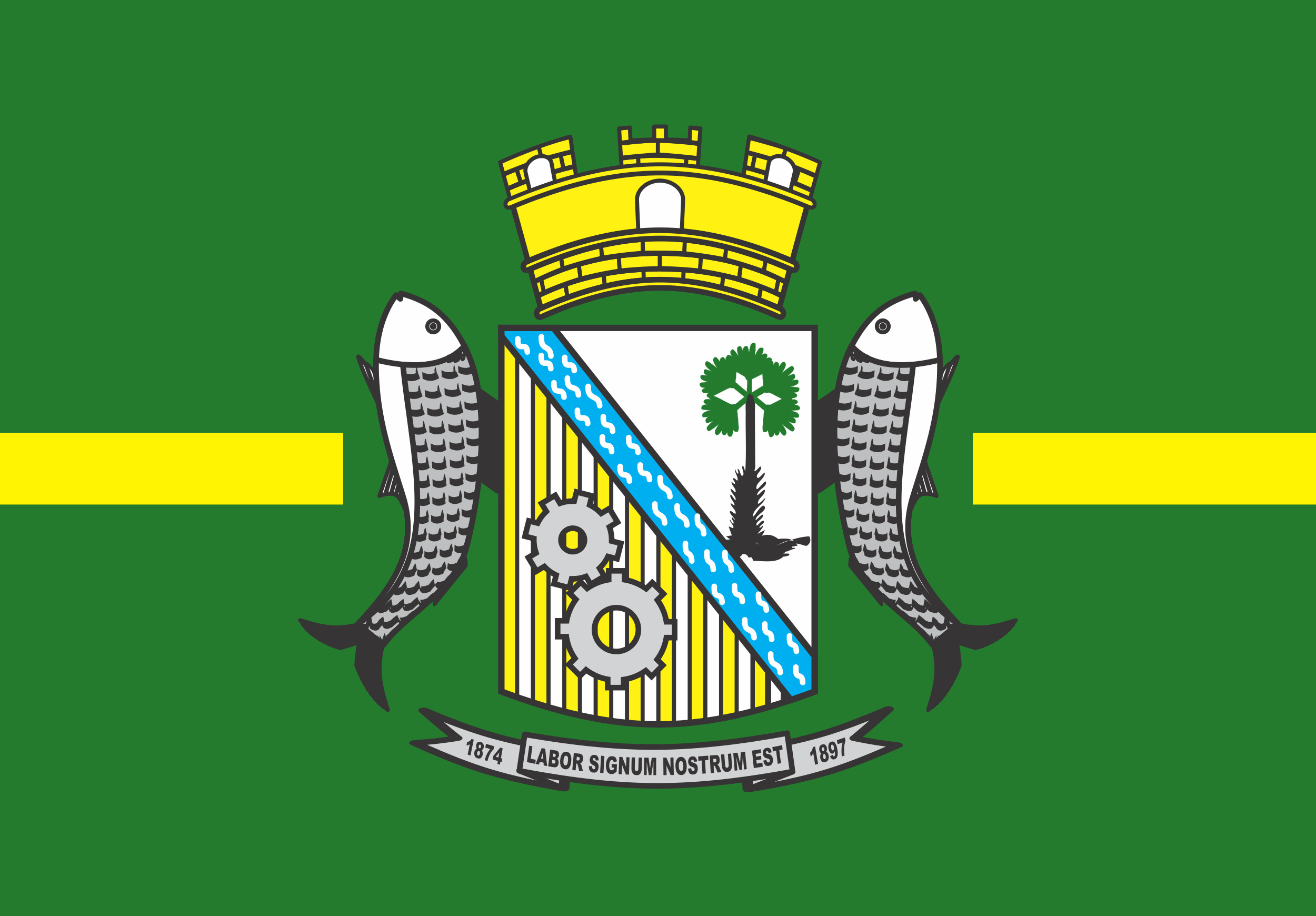
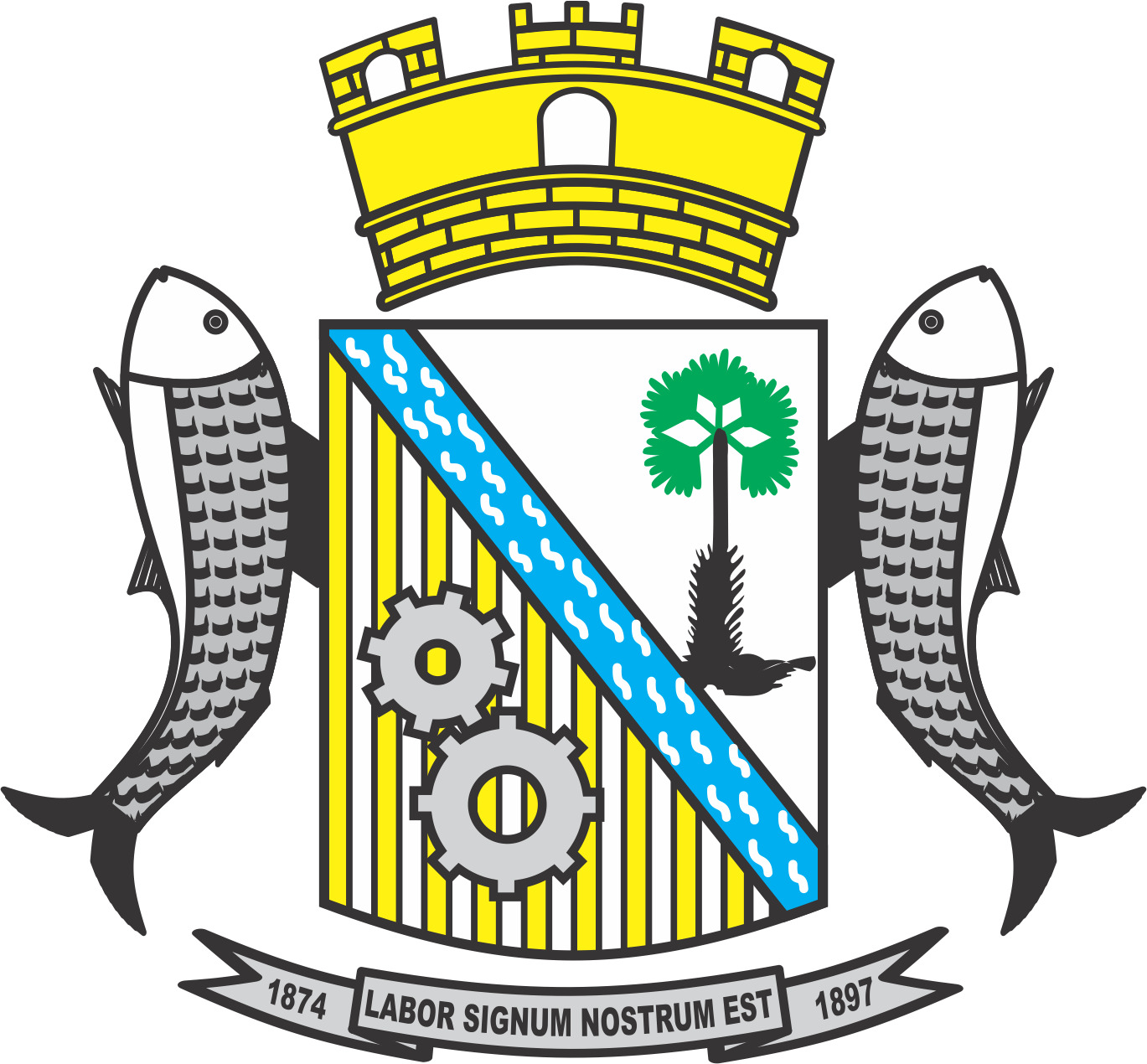
- Flag Coat of arms
- Nickname: Princesa do Sul
- Motto: Labor signum nostrum est — Work is our sign
- Location of Floriano in the State of Piauí

- Coordinates: 6°46′01″S 43°01′22″W
- Country: Brazil
- Region: Northeast
- State: Piauí
- Founded: July 8, 1897

Government
  - Mayor: Antônio Reis Neto (/Democracia Cristâ, 2021 – 2024)

Area
  - Total: 3,409.664 km^{2} (1,316.479 sq mi)
- Elevation: 112 m (367 ft)

Population (2020)
  - Total: 60,025
  - Density: 17.2/km^{2} (45/sq mi)
- Time zone: UTC−3 (BRT)
- HDI: 0.711 – medium

Floriano (locally [flʌɾiɐ̃nu]) is a Brazilian municipality in the state of Piauí. It was founded by the Arabs and Syrians. It is situated in the physiographic zone of the Médio Parnaíba, on the right side of the Parnaíba River, in front of the city of Barão de Grajaú, in the Maranhão. It is also intersected by the rivers Gurguéia and Itaueira.

== Etymology ==
At the time of founding, when it was elevated to city level in 1897, it received its name in homage to former president Floriano Peixoto.

== Generalities ==
Vegetation

Cerrado is the region's predominant vegetation, however there are places where there is a blend of caatinga as well. Regarding the agriculture, the highlights are the castanha de caju and the mandioca.

Climate

Because of its location in the state's interior region, Floriano shows a semi-arid tropical climate. The temperature stays between 29°C and 37°C and rainfall is scarcer than the northern region of the state - with a dry period that lasts six months. Rain is most predominant between the months of November and April.

Hidrography

The Parnaíba River is the main body of water in Floriano, separating it from its neighbor city Barão de Grajaú, in the state of Maranhão. Because of that, it's the second fluvial port in Piauí.

== Climate ==
Climate data for Floriano (1991–2020)
Month	Jan	Feb	Mar	Apr	May	Jun	Jul	Aug	Sep	Oct	Nov	Dec	Year
Mean daily maximum °C (°F)	32.7 (90.9)	32.2 (90.0)	32.3 (90.1)	32.7 (90.9)	33.5 (92.3)	34.2 (93.6)	34.9 (94.8)	36.3 (97.3)	37.6 (99.7)	37.7 (99.9)	35.7 (96.3)	34.1 (93.4)	34.5 (94.1)
Mean daily minimum °C (°F)	22.8 (73.0)	22.6 (72.7)	22.8 (73.0)	22.8 (73.0)	22.4 (72.3)	21.8 (71.2)	22.1 (71.8)	23.3 (73.9)	24.6 (76.3)	25.1 (77.2)	24.3 (75.7)	23.5 (74.3)	23.2 (73.8)
Average precipitation mm (inches)	187.0 (7.36)	164.0 (6.46)	183.3 (7.22)	127.9 (5.04)	51.9 (2.04)	6.1 (0.24)	4.3 (0.17)	0.5 (0.02)	11.9 (0.47)	49.0 (1.93)	77.4 (3.05)	119.1 (4.69)	982.4 (38.68)
Average precipitation days (≥ 1.0 mm)	13	13	14	10	5	1	0	0	1	4	7	9	77
Average relative humidity (%)	77.9	80.3	81.6	78.8	70.6	59.0	48.9	42.6	40.3	46.4	60.2	69.1	63.0
Mean monthly sunshine hours	163.6	150.8	170.1	201.9	249.8	271.9	295.6	318.1	297.6	277.7	219.1	198.9	2,815.1
Source: Instituto Nacional de Meteorologia
