= Angical do Piauí =

Coordinates: 6°05′S 42°44′W

- Municipality
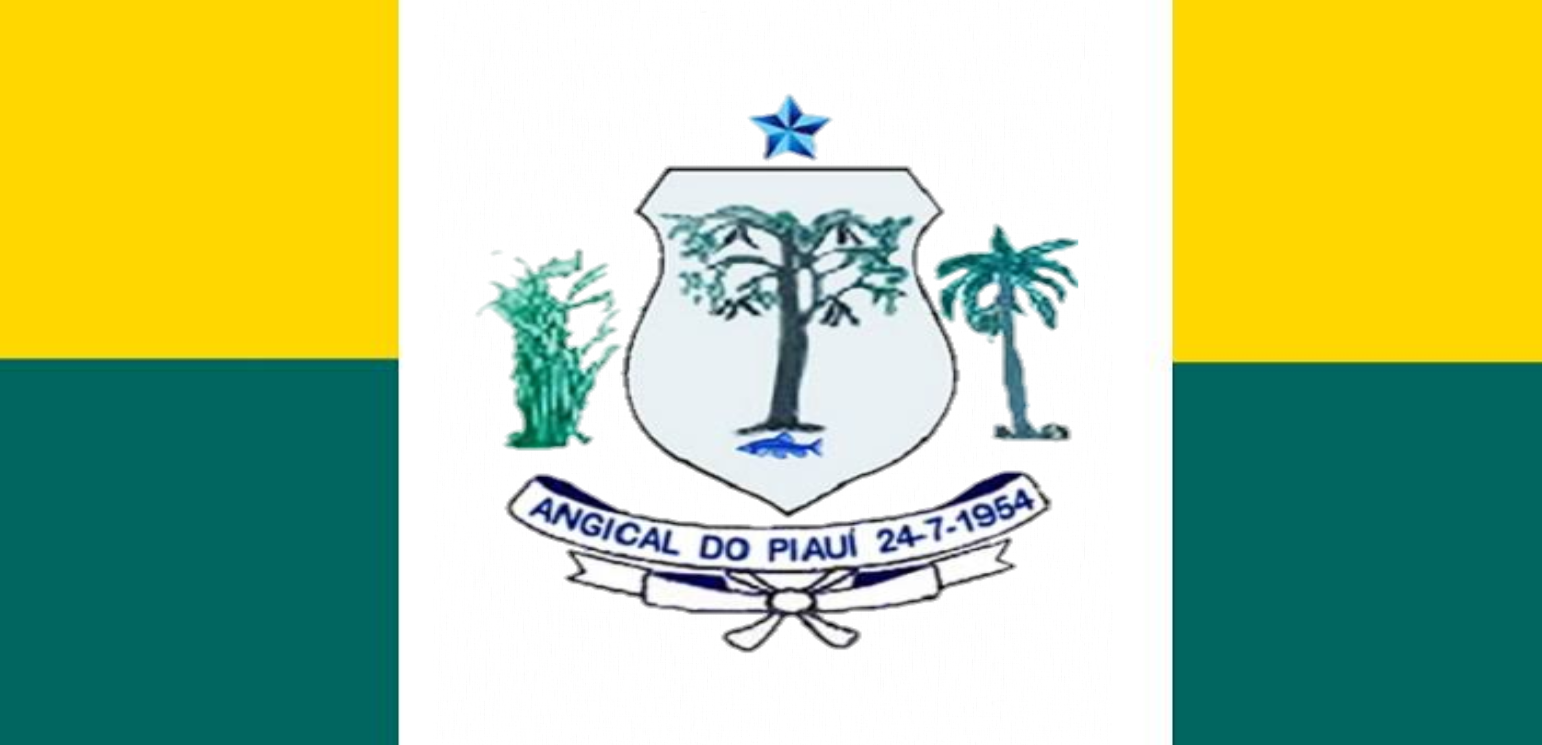
- Flag

- Country: Brazil
- Region: Nordeste
- State: Piauí
- Mesoregion: Centro-Norte Piauiense

Population (2020)
  - Total: 6,783
- Time zone: UTC−3 (BRT)

Angical do Piauí is a municipality in the state of Piauí in the Northeast region of Brazil.

== See also ==
- List of municipalities in Piauí
