= Socorro do Piauí =

Coordinates: 7°52′S 42°29′W

- Municipality
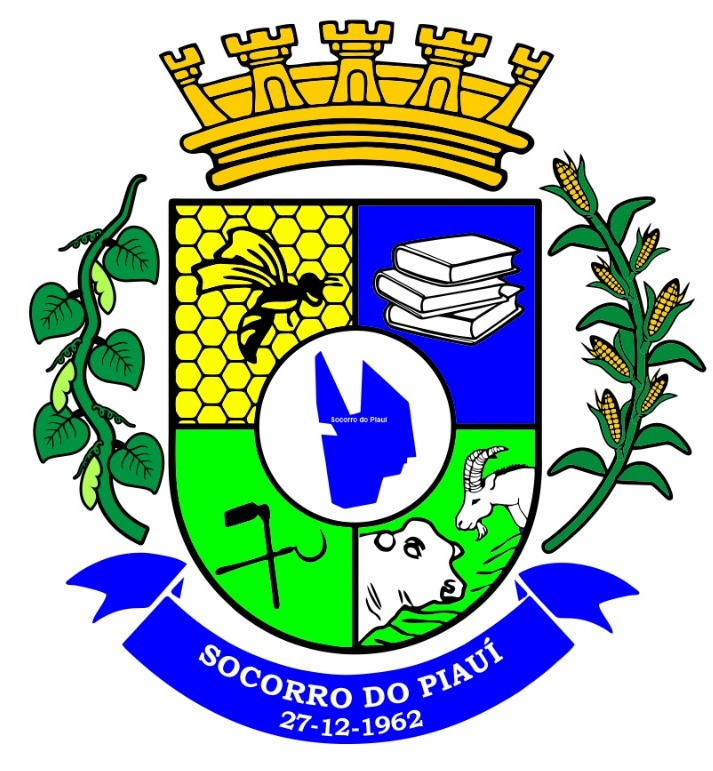
- Coat of arms

- Country: Brazil
- Region: Nordeste
- State: Piauí
- Mesoregion: Sudeste Piauiense

Population (2020)
  - Total: 4,563
- Time zone: UTC−3 (BRT)

Socorro do Piauí is a municipality in the state of Piauí in the Northeast region of Brazil.

== See also ==
- List of municipalities in Piauí
