= Nossa Senhora de Nazaré, Piauí =

Coordinates: 4.63083°S 42.1728°W

Nossa Senhora de Nazaré
- Municipality
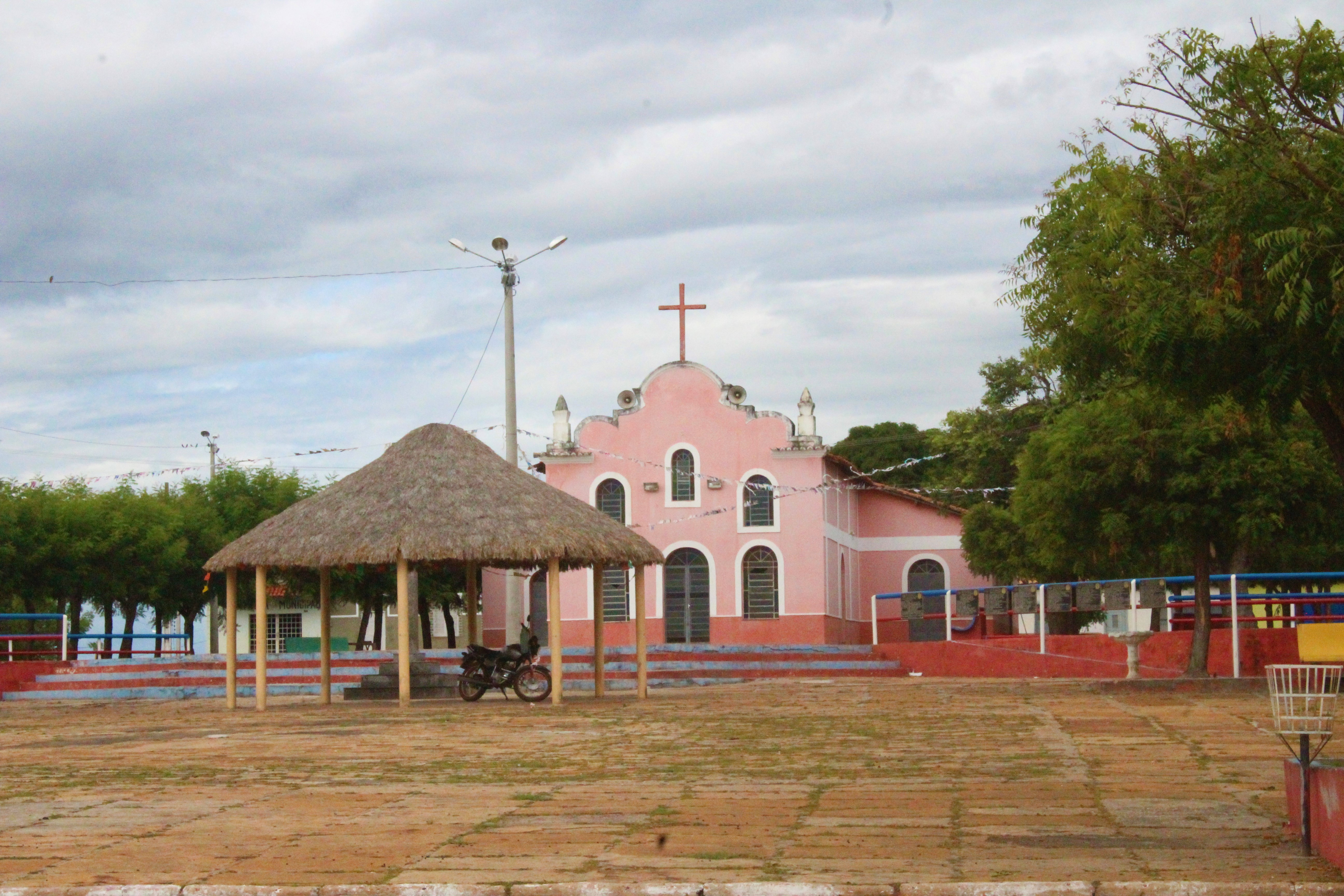

- Country: Brazil
- Region: Nordeste
- State: Piauí
- Mesoregion: Centro-Norte Piauiense

Population (2020)
  - Total: 4,891
- Time zone: UTC−3 (BRT)

Nossa Senhora de Nazaré is a municipality in the state of Piauí in the Northeast region of Brazil.

== See also ==
- List of municipalities in Piauí
