= Miguel Leão =

- Municipality
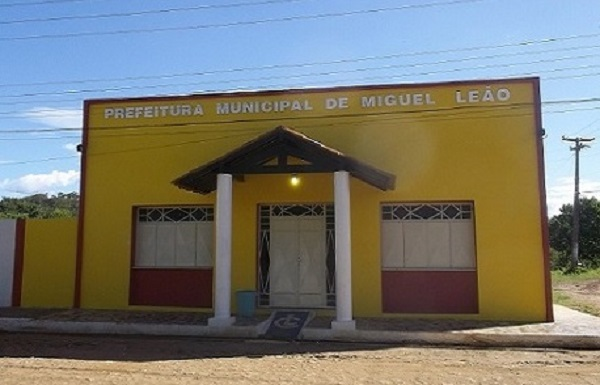

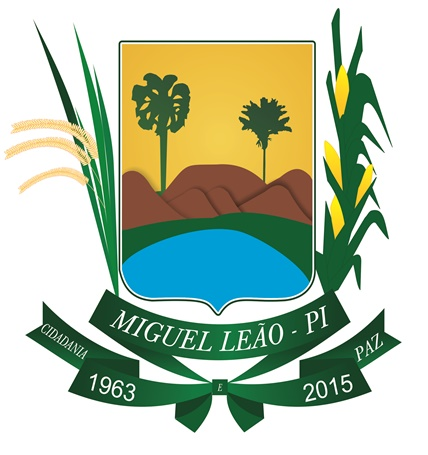
- Coat of arms

- Location in Brazil
- Coordinates: 5°41′S 42°44′W
- Country: Brazil
- Region: Nordeste
- State: Piauí
- Mesoregion: Centro-Norte Piauiense

Population (2020)
  - Total: 1,242
- Time zone: UTC−3 (BRT)

Miguel Leão is a municipality in the state of Piauí in the Northeast region of Brazil.

== See also ==
- List of municipalities in Piauí
