= Barão de Grajaú =

Coordinates: 6°45′S 43°01′W

Floriano -PI
- Municipality
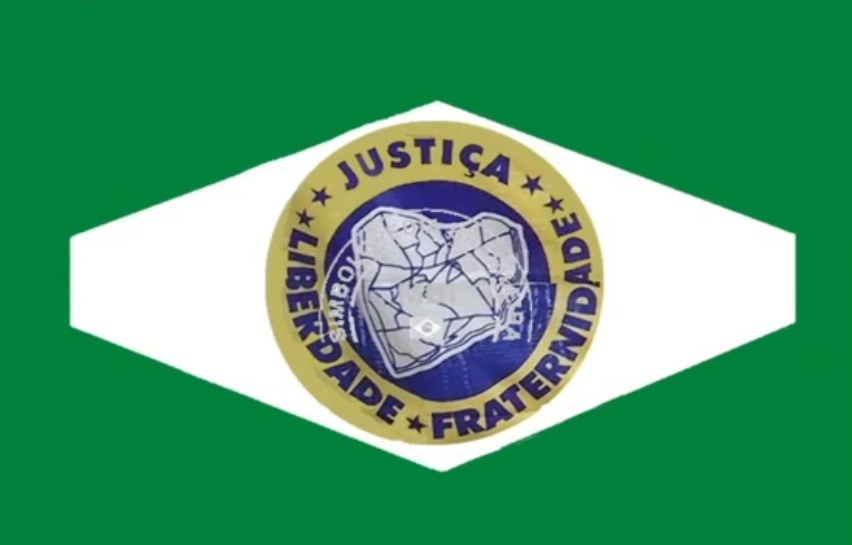
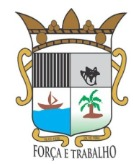
- Flag Coat of arms
- Interactive map of Floriano -PI
- Country: Brazil
- Region: Nordeste
- State: Maranhão
- Mesoregion: Leste Maranhense

Population (2020)
  - Total: 18,924
- Time zone: UTC−3 (BRT)

Barão de Grajaú is a municipality in the state of Maranhão in the Northeast region of Brazil.

== See also ==
- List of municipalities in Maranhão
