= Nossa Senhora dos Remédios, Piauí =

Coordinates: 3°59′S 42°40′W

Nossa Senhora dos Remédios
- Municipality
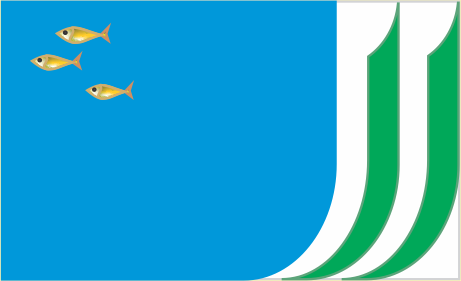
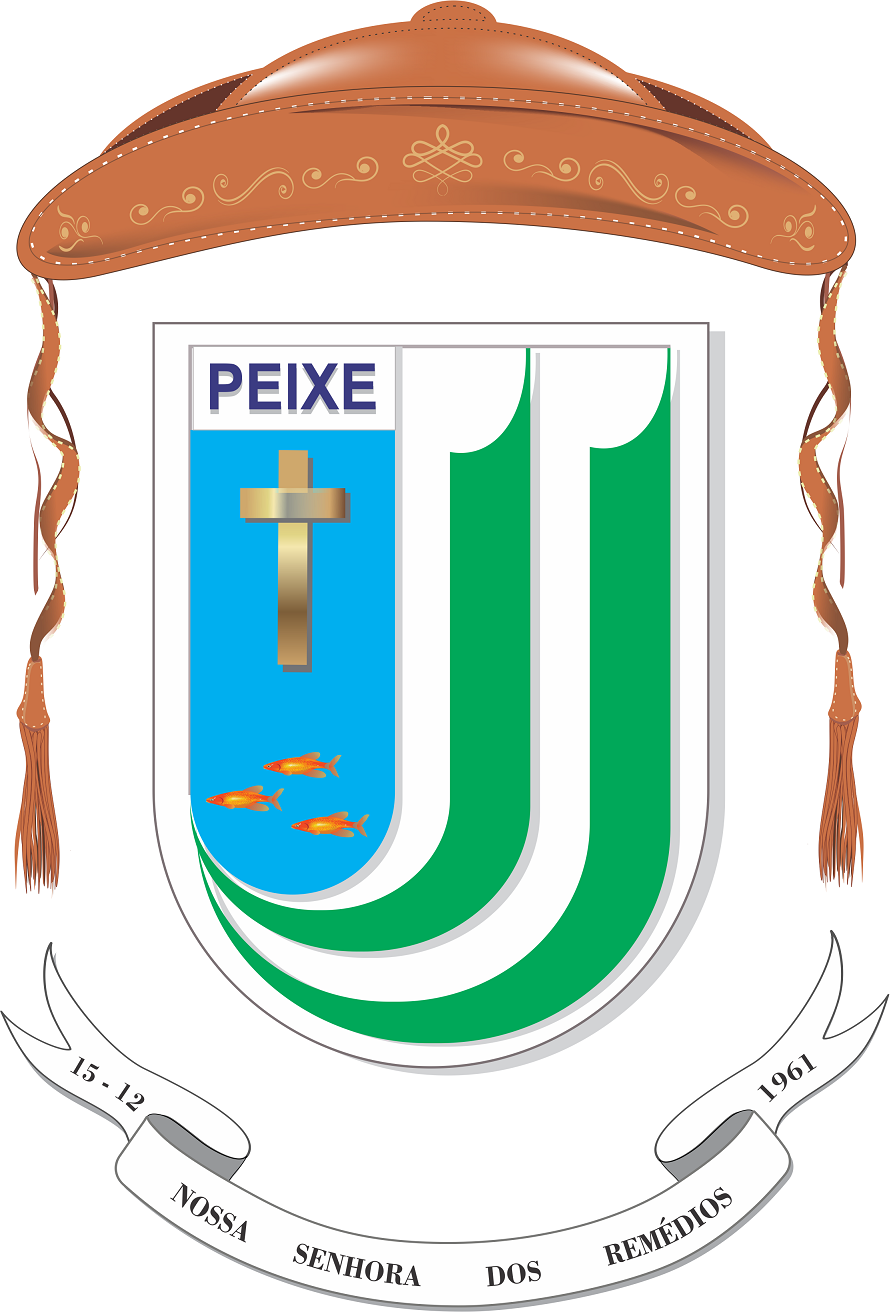
- Flag Coat of arms

- Country: Brazil
- Region: Nordeste
- State: Piauí
- Mesoregion: Norte Piauiense

Population (2020)
  - Total: 8,723
- Time zone: UTC−3 (BRT)

Nossa Senhora dos Remédios is a municipality in the state of Piauí in the Northeast region of Brazil.

== See also ==
- List of municipalities in Piauí
