= Lagoa Alegre =

- Municipality
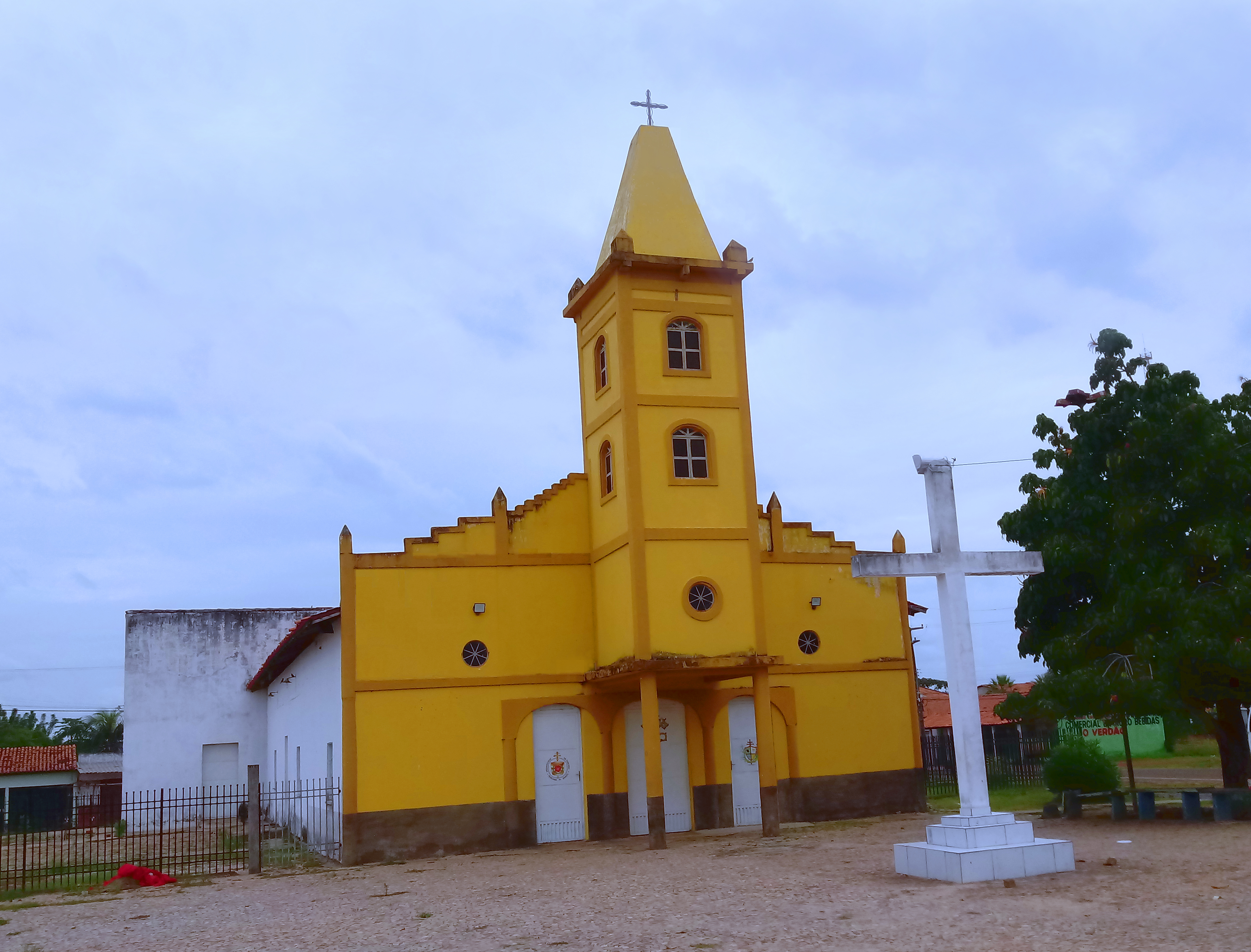

- Location in Brazil
- Coordinates: 4°30′50″S 42°37′25″W
- Country: Brazil
- Region: Nordeste
- State: Piauí
- Mesoregion: Centro-Norte Piauiense

Population (2020)
  - Total: 8,577
- Time zone: UTC−3 (BRT)

Lagoa Alegre is a municipality in the state of Piauí in the Northeast region of Brazil.

== See also ==
- List of municipalities in Piauí
