= Monsenhor Gil =

Coordinates: 5°35′S 42°37′W

- Municipality
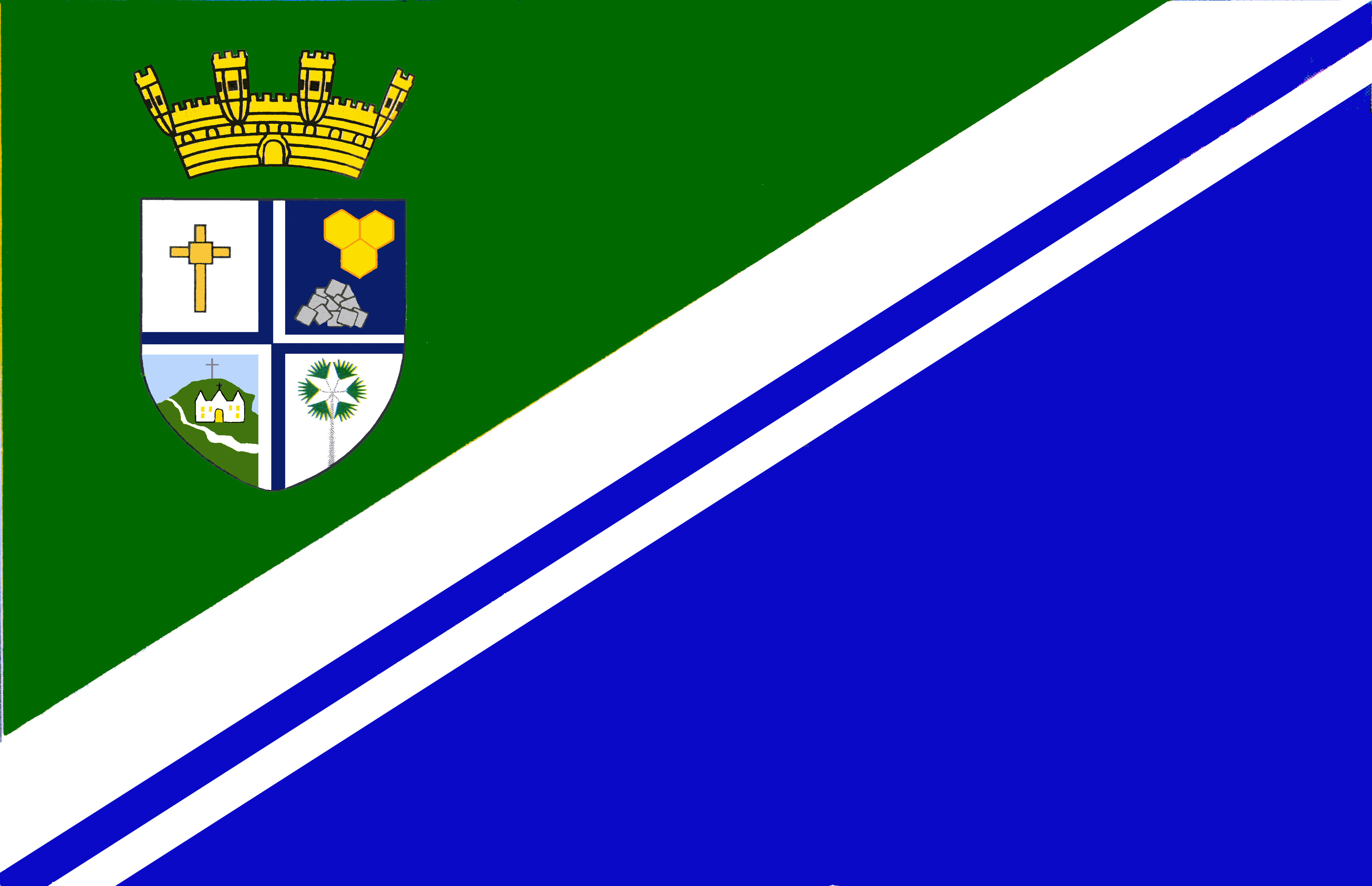
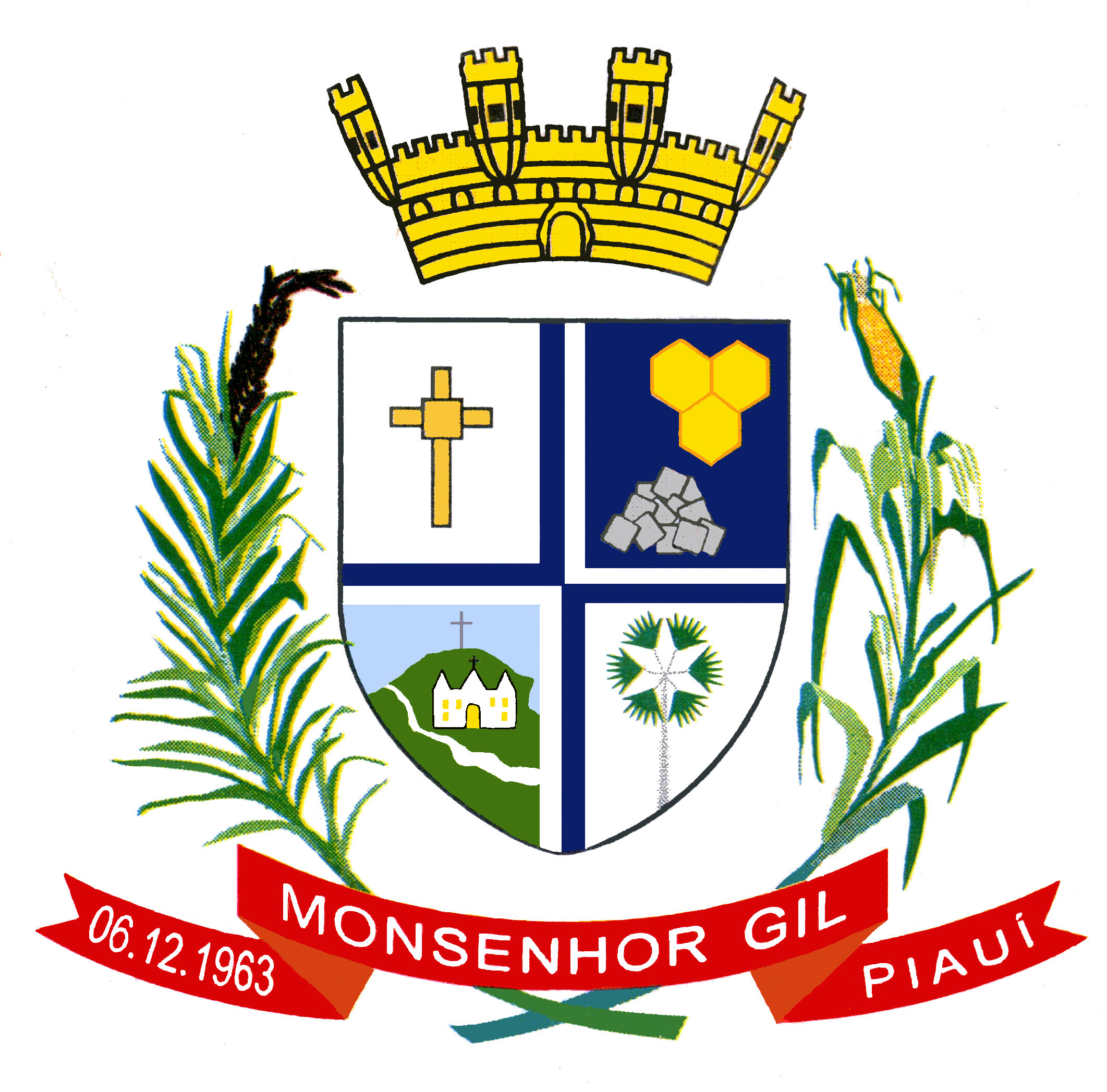
- Flag Coat of arms

- Country: Brazil
- Region: Nordeste
- State: Piauí
- Mesoregion: Centro-Norte Piauiense

Population (2020)
  - Total: 10,564
- Time zone: UTC−3 (BRT)

Monsenhor Gil is a municipality in the state of Piauí in the Northeast region of Brazil.

== See also ==
- List of municipalities in Piauí
