= List of people with surname Martin =

Following is a list of people with the surname Martin or Martín:

== A ==
- Adam Martin (disambiguation)
- Agnes Martin (1912–2004), Canadian painter
- Alberta Martin (1906–2004), Confederate widow thought to be the last widow whose marriage to a Civil War soldier produced offspring
- Alberto Martín (born 1978), Spanish tennis player
- Alexander Martin (disambiguation)
- Alexandra Martin (born 1968), French politician
- Alexandra Martin (born 1976), French politician
- Alijah Martin (born 2001), American basketball player
- Allen Martin (1844–1924), founder of Port Adelaide Grammar School
- Alphonse Martin (1884–1947), Canadian musician
- Alphonse Martin (water polo) (born 1930), Belgian water polo player
- Alphonse-Fortunat Martin (1849–1905), Canadian politician
- Américo Martín (1938–2022), Venezuelan politician
- Andrea Martin (musician) (1972–2021), American R&B singer-songwriter
- Andreas Martin (disambiguation)
- Andrej Martin (born 1989), Slovak tennis player
- Andrea Martin (born 1947), American-Canadian actress and comedian
- Andrew Martin (disambiguation)
- Ann M. Martin (born 1955), American author of The Baby-sitters Club series
- Annie Montgomerie Martin (1841–1918), educator in South Australia
- Augustus Pearl Martin (1835–1902), American Civil War artillery officer and mayor of Boston, Massachusetts
- Austin Martin (born 1999), American baseball player

== B ==
- Baptiste Martin (born 1985), French footballer
- Barney Martin (1923–2005), American actor
- Barrie Martin (1935–2019), English footballer
- Bent Martin (born 1943), Danish footballer, father of Camilla Martin
- Bernard F. Martin (1845–1914), American politician
- Bernice Fenwick Martin (1902–1999), Canadian painter and printmaker
- Bettina Martin (born 1966), German politician
- Bill Martin (disambiguation)
- Billy Martin (disambiguation)
- Blakey Martin (1891–1940), English footballer
- Bob Martin (disambiguation)
- Bobbi Martin (1943–2000), American musician
- Bobby Martin (disambiguation)
- Bombette Martin (born 2006), British-American skateboarder
- Brad Martin (disambiguation)
- Brady Martin (born 2007), Canadian ice hockey player
- Brett Martin (baseball) (born 1995), American baseball player
- Brodric Martin (born 1999), American football player
- Bunsom Martin (1922–2008), Thai doctor, professor, Minister of Education, Minister of Public Health and President of Chiang Mai University

== C ==
- Caleb Martin (American football) (1924–1994), American football player
- Camilla Martin (born 1974), Danish badminton player, later TV presenter
- Carmi Martin (born 1963), Filipino actress
- Catherine Martin (director) (born 1958), Canadian screenwriter and director
- Celora E. Martin (1834–1909), American lawyer and politician
- Chandler Martin (born 2002), American football player
- Charles Martin (disambiguation)
- Charlie Martin (physicist) (1926–1999), British physicist
- Charlie Martin (Australian footballer) (1883–1955), Australian rules football player
- Charlie Martin (racing driver, born 1913) (1913–1998), British racing driver
- Charlie Martin (racing driver, born 1981), British racing driver
- Chris Martin (disambiguation)
- Christian Martin (television executive) (born 1967), American television executive
- Christian Frederick Martin (1796–1873), German guitar builder, founder of C.F. Martin & Company
- Christy Martin (boxer) (born 1968), world champion woman boxer
- Chuck Martin (disambiguation)
- Clare Martin (born 1952), Australian politician
- Claude Martin (1735–1800), French adventurer, soldier and founder of three schools
- Clive Martin (born 1935), British businessman, Lord Mayor of London
- Coco Martin (born 1981), Filipino actor, director, and film producer
- Cody Martin (baseball) (born 1989), American baseball pitcher
- Cody Martin (basketball) (born 1995), American basketball player and twin brother of fellow player Caleb Martin
- Corbin Martin (born 1995), American baseball player
- Craig Martin (Canadian soccer) (born 1957), Canadian football (soccer) player
- Craig Martin (South African soccer) (born 1993), South African soccer player
- Curtis Martin (born 1973), American football player

== D ==
- Damian Martin (born 1984), Australian basketballer
- Daniel Martin (disambiguation), including Dan and Dani Martin
- Danielle Martin (born 1975), Canadian politician
- Darrick Martin (born 1971), American basketball player and coach
- David Martin (disambiguation)
- Davis Martin (born 1997), American baseball player
- Dean Martin (1917–1995), American singer and actor
- Deangelo Martin (born 1985), American serial killer
- Dee Martin (born 1949), American football player
- Del Martin (1921–2008), American feminist and gay-rights activist
- Demetri Martin (born 1973), Greek-American comedian
- Denys R. Martin (1892–1970), British officer of the Royal Engineers, philatelist
- Derek Martin (1933–2026), English actor
- Derrick Martin (born 1985), American football player
- Dewey Martin (musician) (1940–2009), Canadian rock drummer
- Dick Martin (artist) (1927–1990), American illustrator
- Dick Martin (comedian) (1922–2008), American comedian
- Dick Martin (trade unionist) (1944–2001), Canadian trade unionist
- Don Martin (disambiguation)
- Donald A. Martin (born 1940), set theorist (mathematician) at UCLA
- Dorothee Martin (born 1978), German politician
- Dottie Martin (born 1937), First Lady of North Carolina
- Douglas Martin (disambiguation)
- Duane Martin (born 1965), American actor
- Dude Martin (1915–1991), American country singer, bandleader, radio and television host
- Dustin Martin (born 1991), Australian rules footballer

== E ==
- Eamon Martin (born 1961), Irish bishop
- Eamon Martin (Irish republican) (1892–1971)
- Eamonn Martin (born 1958), English former long distance runner
- Earl Martin, American politician
- Earl F. Martin, American academic administrator
- Edith T. Martin, American artist and museum professional
- Édouard-Onésiphore Martin (1841–1889), Canadian politician
- Edward Martin (disambiguation)
- Élisa Martin (born 1972), French politician
- Elliot Martin (1924–2017), American theater producer
- Emil Martin, German sports shooter
- Eric Martin (musician) (born 1960), American musician (Mr. Big)
- Eric Martin (racing driver) (1969–2002), American racing driver
- Erkan Martin (born 1984), Turkish football player
- Ersen Martin (1979–2024), Turkish football player
- Ernest Martin (disambiguation)
- Ernie Martin (1903–1996), Australian rules footballer
- Eugene J. Martin (1938–2005), American painter

== F ==
- Felisa Martín Bravo (1898–1979), Spanish physicist
- Felix Martin (1899–1969), American baseball player
- Felix Martin, member of British synthpop band Hot Chip
- Félix Martin (1804–1886), French historian and antiquarian
- Fergus Martin (born 1955), Irish artist
- Fernando Martín (disambiguation)
- Fiona Martin (born 1977), Australian politician
- Florence Martin (1867–1957), Australian-American physicist and philanthropist
- Francis Martin (disambiguation)
- François Martin (disambiguation)
- Frank Martin (disambiguation)
- Franklin H. Martin (1857–1935), American physician
- Frederick Martin (disambiguation)
- F. X. Martin (1922–2000), Irish priest and historian

== G ==
- Gail R. Martin (1944–2026), American biologist
- Gavin Martin (1961–2022), Northern Irish music journalist
- Gene Martin (born 1947), American baseball player
- George Martin (disambiguation)
- Georges Martin (engineer) (1930–2017), French engineer and automotive designer
- Gillian Martin, Scottish politician
- Gillian Martin (badminton), Scottish international badminton player
- Glenn Martin (disambiguation)
- Gordon Eugene Martin (born 1925), American physicist and author
- George Martin (disambiguation)
- Guillaume Martin (born 1993), French cyclist

== H ==
- Hal Martin (born 1985), American racing driver
- Hannah Martin (disambiguation)
- Harley A. Martin (1880–1951), American politician
- Harry S. Martin (born 1943), American librarian and legal scholar
- Hans-Peter Martin (born 1957), Austrian journalist and MEP
- Henno Martin (1910–1998), German geologist
- Henri Martin (1793–1882), French lion tamer
- Horace Martin (born 1985), Jamaican-Dutch kickboxer
- Howard Martin (1934–2024), British doctor

== I ==
- Illa Martin (1900–1988), German dendrologist, botanist, conservationist and dentist
- Iyana Martín (born 2006), Spanish basketball player

== J ==
- Jacob Martin (American football) (born 1995), American football player
- Jacques Martin (disambiguation)
- James Martin (disambiguation), also includes Jim and Jimmy Martin
- Jamie Martin (American football) (born 1970), American football player
- Jan Martín (born 1984), German-Israeli-Spanish basketball player
- Jane Martin (public servant) (fl. 2021), British public servant
- Janis Martin (1940–2007), American rockabilly and country music singer
- Janis Martin (soprano) (1939–2014), American soprano
- Jarell Martin (born 1994), American basketball player
- Javier Martín de Villa (born 1981), Spanish ski mountaineer
- J. C. Martin (baseball) (born 1936), American baseball player
- Jean-Michel Martin (born 1953), Belgian racing driver
- Jeff Martin (disambiguation)
- Jenna Martin (born 1988), Canadian track and field athlete
- Jenna Martin (curler) (born 1993), American female curler
- Jenova Martin (1866–1937), Norwegian-American suffragist and writer
- Jeremiah Martin (born 1996), American basketball player
- Jeremiah Martin (American football) (born 1999), American football player
- Jerome Martin (1908–1977), Wisconsin politician
- Jérôme Martin (born 1986), French former footballer
- Jerry Martin (composer), American jazz, New Age and video game composer
- Jesse Martin (disambiguation)
- Jessica Martin (actor) (born 1962), British actor and comedian
- Jessica Martin (priest) (born 1963), British Anglican priest
- Jill Martin (1938–2016), English musical theatre actress
- Joan Martin (1933–2019), All-American Girls Professional Baseball League player
- Joelle Martin, American politician
- John Martin (disambiguation)
- Jorge Martín (born 1998), Spanish motorcycle racer
- José Martín Quesada (1935–1996), Spanish cyclist
- José Miguel González Martín (born 1963), Spanish football player
- Joseph Martin (disambiguation)
- Josh Martin (American football) (born 1991), American football player
- Josh Martin (footballer) (born 2001), English footballer
- Joshua L. Martin (1799–1856), American politician, Governor of Alabama
- Josiah Martin (1737–1786), ninth and last British governor of North Carolina
- Josie Martin (born 1988), American music producer
- J. P. Martin (1880–1966), English Methodist minister and writer
- Judith Martin (born 1938), American journalist and etiquette writer as "Miss Manners"
- Jüri Martin (1940–2025), Estonian politician
- Justyn Martin, American football player

== K ==
- Kamal Martin (born 1998), American football player
- Karlheinz Martin (1886–1948), German stage and film director
- Kate Martin (born 2000), American basketball player
- Keith Martin (disambiguation)
- Kelan Martin (born 1995), American basketball player
- Kellie Martin (born 1975), American actress
- Kelvin Martin (1964–1987), American gangster and namesake of 50 Cent
- Ken Martin (born 1973), American politician
- Ken Martin (runner) (born 1958), American long-distance runner
- Ken Martin (Australian sculptor) (born 1952) South Australian sculptor
- Kenneth Martin (English painter) (1905–1984), English painter and sculptor
- Kenneth Martin (judge), a former judge of the Supreme Court of Western Australia
- Kenny Martin (born 1960), American racing driver
- Kenyon Martin (born 1977), American basketball player
- Kenyon Martin Jr. (born 2001), American basketball player
- Kevin Martin (basketball, born 1983) (born 1983), American basketball player
- Keyon Martin (born 2001), American football player
- Khobie Martin (born 2006), American football player
- Kim Martin (born 1986), Swedish female ice hockey goalkeeper
- Knox Martin (1923–2022), American abstract expressionist artist
- Koda Martin (born 1995), American football player

== L ==
- Laura Martin (born 1975), Colombian-American colorist
- Laura K. Martin, (fl. 2026), American political strategist and community organizer
- Lee Martin (disambiguation)
- Leonys Martín (born 1988), Cuban-American professional baseball player
- Leslie Dale Martin (1967–2002), American murderer
- Leslie H. Martin (1900–1983), Australian physicist and academic
- Lewis Martin (disambiguation)
- Lionel Martin (1878–1945), English businessman, co-founder of Aston Martin
- LJ Martin, American football player
- Louis Martin (disambiguation)
- Lucas Martin (born 1968), American soccer player
- Luisa Martín Rojo, (born 1961), Spanish linguist and researcher
- Luke Martin (born 1981), Australian basketball player
- Luther Martin (1748–1826), American politician

== M ==
- Mac Martin (1925–2022), American bluegrass musician
- Madeleine Martin (born 1993), American actress
- Madeline Martin, American author
- Malachi Martin (1921–1999), Irish Roman Catholic priest and religious author
- Mandy Martin (1952–2021), Australian artist
- Mardik Martin (1936–2019), American screenwriter
- Margaret V. Martin (born 1979), American professional bodybuilder
- Maria Martin (disambiguation)
- Marialejandra Martín (born 1964), Venezuelan actress
- Marianne Martin (born 1957), American road racing cyclist
- Marianne K. Martin (born 1945/1946), American novelist, publisher, and former sports coach
- Marilyn Martin (born 1954), American singer
- Mark Martin (disambiguation)
- Markko Märtin (born 1975), Estonian rally driver
- Marsai Martin (born 2004), American actress
- Martin A. Martin (1910–1963), American criminal and civil rights attorney
- Marvin Martin (born 1988), French footballer
- Mary Martin (disambiguation)
- Matt Martin (disambiguation)
- Max Martin (born 1971), Swedish musician and producer
- Maxime Martin (born 1986), Belgian racing driver
- Meaghan Martin (born 1992), American actress and singer
- Michael Martin (disambiguation)
- Michelle Martin (born 1967), Australian squash player
- Mike Martin (disambiguation)
- Millicent Martin (born 1934), English actress and singer
- Moon Martin (1945–2020), American singer-songwriter and guitarist
- Sir Mordaunt Martin, 4th Baronet (1740–1815), 4th Martin baronet of Long Melford
- Myra Belle Martin (1861–1936), American teacher, writer and financier

== N ==
- Nealy Martin
- Nicholas Martin (disambiguation), multiple people
- Nickolas Martin (born 2002), American football player
- Noël Martin (1959–2020), Jamaican-English paraplegic, victim of a Neo-Nazi attack
- Sir Norman Martin (1893–1979), Australian politician

== O ==
- Otis Martin (1918–1955), American racing driver

== P ==
- Pamela Martin (disambiguation)
- Pat Martin (born 1955), Canadian politician
- Pat Martin (baseball) (1894–1949), American baseball pitcher
- Patrick Martin (disambiguation)
- Paul Martin (disambiguation)
- Pauline Martin (born 1952), Canadian film actress
- Pauline Martin (baseball), All-American Girls Professional Baseball League player in the 1946 season
- Paulo César Martin (1964–2026), Brazilian journalist and radiobroadcaster
- Peggy Smith Martin (1931–2012), American politician
- Pepper Martin (1904–1965), American baseball player
- Percy Martin (artist), American printmaker
- Percy Seymour Martin (1890–1968), Canadian soldier
- Peter Martin (disambiguation)
- Petr Martin (born 1989), Czech squash player
- Phillip Martin (1926–2010), Native American political leader
- Philipp Leopold Martin (1815–1885), German taxidermist, naturalist and conservationist
- Philip Martin (disambiguation), including Phil Martin
- Philippe Martin (disambiguation)
- Phonney Martin (1845–1933), American baseball player
- Pierre Martin (disambiguation)
- Pierre-Émile Martin (1824–1915), French industrial engineer

== Q ==
- Quan Martin (born 2000), American football player
- Quinn Martin (1922–1987), American television producer

== R ==
- Remy Martin (basketball) (born 1998), American basketball player
- Rémy Martin (rugby union) (born 1979), French rugby union footballer
- Rhonda Belle Martin (1906–1957), American serial killer and family annihilator
- Richard Martin (disambiguation)
- Richie Martin (born 1994), American baseball player
- Rick Martin (1951–2011) born Richard Martin, Canadian ice-hockey player
- Ricky Martin (born 1971), Puerto Rican singer
- Riley Martin (baseball) (born 1998), American baseball player
- Rob Martin (born 1949), first Anglican bishop of Marsabit in Kenya
- Robby Martin (born 1999), American baseball player
- Robert Martin (disambiguation)
- Roch Martin (born 1964), Canadian Roman Catholic bishop
- Rodolfo Martín Villa (born 1934), Spanish politician
- Roger Martin (disambiguation)
- Roland S. Martin (born 1968), American journalist
- Ronnie Martin, American musician who records as Joy Electric
- Rudy Martin Jr. (born 1996), American baseball player
- Russ Martin (1960–2021), American radio presenter
- Russ Martin (American football) (born 1956), American football player and coach
- Russell Martin (baseball) (born 1983), Canadian baseball player
- Russell Martin (footballer) (born 1986), British football manager and former player

== S ==
- Saige Martin, American artist and politician
- Samuel Martin (linguist) (1924–2009), linguist (Korean and Japanese) and designer of the Yale Romanization for Korean
- Sandor Martin (born 1993), Spanish boxer
- Santiago Martín Sánchez (born 1938), "El Viti", Spanish bullfighter
- Selina Martin (1882–1972), English suffragette
- Sheila Martin (born 1943), wife of former Canadian Prime Minister Paul Martin
- Spencer Martin (ice hockey) (born 1995), Canadian ice hockey goaltender
- Spencer Martin (racing driver) (born 1939), Australian racing driver
- Stefan Martin (born 1986), Australian rules footballer
- Stefanie Martin (1877-1940), German biological anthropologist
- Steve Martin (born 1945), American actor, comedian, musician, and author
- Strother Martin (1919–1980), American actor
- Sylvia Wene Martin (1930–2013), American bowler

== T ==
- Talia Martin (born 2000), Australian sprinter
- Tay Martin (born 1997), American football player
- Taylor Martin, Australian politician
- Ted Martin (disambiguation)
- Tee Martin (born 1978), American football player and coach
- Terrance Martin (born 1979), American football player
- Thomas Martin (disambiguation), including Tom Martin
- Tisha Campbell-Martin (born 1968), American actress
- Todd Martin (born 1970), American tennis player
- Tom Martin (Texas politician) (1949–2018), mayor of Lubbock, Texas
- Tony Martin (disambiguation)
- Trayvon Martin (1995–2012), American high school student killed in Florida
- Trevor Martin (disambiguation)
- Tyrese Martin (born 1999), American basketball player
- Tyrone G. Martin (born 1930), American naval historian

== V ==
- Valerie Martin (born 1948), American novelist
- Vince Martin (disambiguation)
- Vincent Martin (born 1960), birth name of Vince Clarke, English musician and songwriter, of the band Erasure
- Virginia Tovar Martín (1929–2013), Spanish art historian, author and professor

== W ==
- Wayne Martin (disambiguation)
- Wednesday Martin, American writer
- Wes Martin (born 1996), American football player
- Wheeler Martin (1765–1836), justice of the Rhode Island Supreme Court
- Whitmell P. Martin (1867–1929), American politician
- William Martin (disambiguation)

== Y ==
- Yolanda Martín, Spanish boccia player

== Z ==
- Zeke Martin (1924–2006), American gridiron football player
- Zeke Martin (1884–1976), American basketball player and coach

== Fictional characters ==
- Zack and Cody Martin, from the sitcom The Suite Life of Zack & Cody
- Martin family, from the soap opera All My Children

== See also ==
- Robert fitz Martin (c. 1095–c. 1159), Anglo-Norman knight, first Lord of Cemais, Wales
- General Martin (disambiguation)
- Judge Martin (disambiguation)
- Justice Martin (disambiguation)
- Senator Martin (disambiguation)
