= Charlie Martin =

Charlie Martin may refer to:

- Charlie Martin (Australian footballer) (1883–1955), Australian rules football player
- Charlie Martin (racing driver, born 1913) (1913–1998), British racing driver
- Charlie Martin (racing driver, born 1981), British racing driver
- Charlie Martin (physicist) (1926–1999), British physicist

== See also ==
- Charles Martin (disambiguation)
- Chuck Martin (disambiguation)
