= Alexandra Martin =

Alexandra Martin may refer to:

- Alexandra Martin (born 1968), French Republican politician
- Alexandra Martin (born 1976), French En Marche politician

== See also ==
- Alexandre Martin
- Alexander Martin (disambiguation)
- Alex Martin (disambiguation)
