= Frederick Martin =

Frederick, Fred, Freddy, or Freddie Martin may refer to:

== Law and politics ==
- Frederick S. Martin (1794–1865), U.S. Representative from New York
- Frederick Martin (politician) (1882–1950), Scottish politician and journalist
- Fred Martin (politician) (born 1950), American politician in Idaho
- Fred C. Martin (1882–1945), Vermont businessman, politician, and government official

== Sports ==
=== Association football (soccer) ===
- Frederick Martin (footballer) (died 1932), English footballer
- Fred Martin (footballer, born 1907) (1907–1978), English footballer
- Freddie Martin (footballer) (1925–1969), English footballer
- Fred Martin (footballer, born 1929) (1929–2013), Scottish footballer

=== Other sports ===
- Frederick Martin (cricketer) (1861–1921), English cricketer
- Fred Martin (baseball) (1915–1979), American baseball player
- Fred Martin (sprinter) (born 1966), Australian sprinter

== Others ==
- Frederick Martin (editor) (1830–1883), German-born British statistician
- Frederick Townsend Martin (1849–1914), American writer and advocate for the poor
- Frederick Martin (general) (1882–1954), American aviation pioneer and WWII general
- Freddy Martin (1906–1983), American saxophonist
- Fred Martin (artist) (1927–2022), American artist
- Fredrik Robert Martin (1868–1933), Swedish diplomat, scholar, collector, art historian, and author
