= Al Martin (disambiguation) =

Al Martin (born 1967) is a former baseball left fielder.

Al Martin may also refer to:

- Al Martin (second baseman) (1847–1915), baseball second baseman
- Al Martin (screenwriter) (1897–1971), American screenwriter

== See also ==
- Albert Martin (disambiguation)
- Alan Martin (disambiguation)
- Allan Martin (disambiguation)
- Alfred Martin (disambiguation)
