= François Martin =

François Martin may refer to:

- François Martin (navigator) (c. 1575-c. 1631), navigator
- François Martin (Pondicherry) (1634–1706), governor of French India
- François Martin (composer) (1727–1757), French composer and cellist
- Francois Xavier Martin (1762–1846), American jurist
- François Martineau (1844–1911), Canadian politician
- François Joseph Martin (1909–1995), American involved in puppetry

== See also ==
- Francis Martin (disambiguation)
