= Senator Martin =

Senator Martin may refer to:

== Members of the Senate of France ==
- Pierre Martin (politician) (1943–2023), senator for Somme from 1995 to 2014
- Henri Martin (historian) (1810–1883), senator for Aisne from 1876 to 1883

== Members of the Senate of the Republic (Mexico) ==
- Juan Antonio Martín del Campo (born 1972), senator for Aguascalientes since 2018

== Members of the Senate of Spain ==
- Ignacio Martín Amaro (1944–2021)
- Rodolfo Martín Villa (born 1934)

== Members of the United States Senate ==
- Alexander Martin (1740–1807), U.S. Senator from North Carolina from 1793 to 1799
- Edward Martin (Pennsylvania politician) (1879–1967), U.S. Senator from Pennsylvania from 1947 until 1959
- George B. Martin (1876–1945), U.S. Senator from Kentucky from 1918 to 1919
- John Martin (Kansas politician) (1833–1913), U.S. Senator from Kansas from 1893 to 1895
- Thomas E. Martin (1893–1971), U.S. Senator from Iowa from 1955 to 1961
- Thomas S. Martin (1847–1919), U.S. Senator from Virginia from 1895 to 1919

== United States state senate members ==
- Alexander E. Martin (1867–after 1830), Wisconsin State Senate
- Allan W. Martin (1874–1942), Vermont State Senate
- Barclay Martin (1802–1890), Tennessee State Senate
- Bernard F. Martin (1845–1914), New York State Senate
- Burleigh Martin (1888–1962), Maine State Senate
- Burnham Martin (1811–1882), Ohio State Senate and Vermont State Senate
- Charles Martin (Alabama politician) (1931–2012), Alabama State Senate
- Dean Martin (politician) (fl. 1990s–2010s), Arizona State Senate
- Fred Martin (Idaho politician) (fl. 1970s–2010s), Idaho State Senate
- Frederick S. Martin (1794–1865), New York State Senate
- Harry C. Martin (1854–1917), Ohio State Senate
- Henri Martin (American politician) (fl. 2010s), Connecticut State Senate
- Jerome Martin (1908–1977), Wisconsin State Senate
- Jesse M. Martin (1877–1915), Arkansas State Senate
- Jimmy Leawood Martin (born 1934), South Carolina State Senate
- Jonathan Martin (Florida politician) (born 1981), Florida State Senate
- John L. Martin (born 1941), Maine State Senate
- John Preston Martin (1811–1862), Kentucky State Senate
- John Martin (Governor of Kansas) (1839–1889), Kansas State Senate
- Joseph W. Martin Jr. (1884–1968), Massachusetts State Senate
- Joseph Martin (general) (1740–1808), North Carolina State Senate
- Larry A. Martin (born 1957), South Carolina Senate
- Levi F. Martin (1843–1909), Wisconsin State Senate
- Lewis J. Martin (1844–1913), New Jersey State Senate
- Lynn Morley Martin (born 1939), Illinois State Senate
- Marty Martin (Wyoming politician) (born 1951), Wyoming State Senate
- Morgan Lewis Martin (1805–1887), Wisconsin State Senate
- Noah Martin (politician) (1801–1863), New Hampshire State Senate
- Robert Martin (New Jersey politician) (born 1947), New Jersey State Senate
- Scott Martin (Pennsylvania politician) (fl. 2010s), Pennsylvania State Senate
- Shane Martin (born 1971), South Carolina State Senate
- Steve Martin (Virginia politician) (born 1956), Virginia State Senate
- Thomas Martin (Maine politician) (fl. 2010s), Maine State Senate
- Vincent A. Martin (1870–1951), Michigan State Senate
- William Harrison Martin (1822–1898), Texas State Senate
- William O'Hara Martin (1845–1901), Nevada State Senate

== See also ==
- Jack Martins (born 1967), New York State Senate
- Lasier Martins (born 1942), Federal Senate (Brazil)
- Wilson Barbosa Martins (1917–2018), Federal Senate (Brazil)
