= Cormac McCarthy (disambiguation) =

Cormac McCarthy was an American author (1933–2023).

Cormac McCarthy also may refer to:

- Other Americans:
  - Cormac McCarthy (musician) (born c. 1950)
- Line of and from ancient Irish leaders:
  - Cormac mac Airt (fl. 2nd, 3rd, or 4th cen.)
  - Cormac Laidir MacCarthy, Lord of Muscry and in 1446 re-builder of Blarney Castle
  - Cormac Mac Cárthaigh (died 1138)
  - Various monarchs of Desmond, and claimants to that line, in 12th to 21st centuries
