= Fernando Martínez =

Fernando Martínez may refer to:

- Fernando Martínez Heredia (1939–2017), Cuban politician
- Fernando Martínez Castellano (1942–2024), Spanish politician
- Fernando Alejandre Martínez (born 1956), Spanish Army officer
- Fernando Martínez Mottola (died 2025), Venezuelan politician
- Nando Martínez (Fernando Martínez Perales, born 1967), Spanish footballer
- Fernando Martínez (journalist) (born 1978), Brazilian sports journalist
- Fernando Martínez (baseball) (born 1988), Major League Baseball player
- Fernando Martínez (Spanish footballer) (born 1990), Spanish footballer
- Fernando Martínez (boxer) (born 1991), Argentine boxer
- Fernando Martínez (runner) (born 1993), Mexican distance runner
- Fernando Martínez (Paraguayan footballer) (born 1994), Paraguayan footballer

== See also ==
- Fernando Martín (disambiguation)
- Chito Martínez (footballer) (Fernando Rafael Martínez Silva, born 1977), Venezuelan footballer
