= Jane Martin (disambiguation) =

Jane Martin is a playwright.

Jane Martin may also refer to:

- Jane Roland Martin (born 1929), American professor of philosophy
- Jane Martin, leading character in The Blob
- Jane Martin, a character in 15 Maiden Lane
- Jane Martin (squash player) (born 1972), English squash international
- Jane Martin (public servant) (fl. 2021), British former Local Government Ombudsman

== See also ==
- Lillien Jane Martin
