= Glen Martin =

Glen Martin may refer to:

- Glen Martin, New South Wales
- Glen W. Martin (1916–1994), American Air Force general

== See also ==
- Glenn Martin (disambiguation)
