= Erwin Otto Marx =

German electrical engineer

- Born: 15 January 1893; Mautitz, Kingdom of Saxony, German Empire
- Died: 11 January 1980 (aged 86); Braunschweig, Lower Saxony, West Germany
- Occupation: Electrical engineer
- Known for: Inventor of the Marx generator HVDC Lehrte–Misburg

Erwin Otto Marx (1893–1980) was a German electrical engineer who invented the Marx generator, a device for producing high voltage electrical pulses.

He worked as an engineering scientist in Braunschweig from 1918 to 1950 where he performed research and development for electrical power distribution via long distances.

== Prizes ==
The Erwin Marx Award is awarded for contributions by individual engineers to pulsed power technology. It was awarded for the first time in 1981 at the 3rd IEEE International Pulsed Power Conference.

The VDE local chapter Braunschweig awards an annual "Erwin-Marx-Prize" to successful graduates from the Braunschweig University of Technology and/or the Ostfalia Hochschule für angewandte Wissenschaften.
