= Mark Martin (educator) =

British Computer Science Teacher

- Education: London South Bank University
- Employer(s): Northeastern University – London; Phoenix High School, Shepherds Bush; Harris Academy South Norwood; South Bank Engineering UTC

Mark Martin MBE is a British Computer Science Teacher, educational technology evangelist and founder of UK Black Tech. He was awarded an MBE in the 2019 Birthday Honours. In 2018 Martin was awarded the Diversity Champion Award at the London Tech Week TechXLR8 Awards and in 2019 was honoured by the Mayor of London for his efforts to increase diversity in technological professions.

== Early life and education ==
Martin attended Carshalton College and studied information technology. He moved to South Thames College for his General National Vocational Qualification in Information Technology and Computer Maintenance. Martin worked with young people in Dulwich and Peckham before joining the teaching profession in 2004. Alongside his teaching he worked toward a bachelor's degree at the University of Surrey where he earned a computer science degree in 2005. Martin was a trainee teacher at Harris Academy South Norwood. His experience at the Harris Academy inspired him to work toward a master's degree in education at London South Bank University. Shortly after he graduated Martin joined Phoenix High School, Shepherds Bush, where he introduced a virtual learning environment. To encourage young people to engage with the VLE Martin included games and video lessons.

== Career ==
Martin is concerned about the rise of inequality in UK education. Martin founded Urban Teacher, a platform and social media handle (@Urban_Teacher) where he shares innovations in educational technology. In 2016 Martin co-founded UK Black Tech, a group of tech experts who are committed to increasing black and minority ethnic representation in UK technology, with David McQueen. In 2018 Martin partnered with PricewaterhouseCoopers to inspire and train more young people from minority ethnic backgrounds in computer science.

Martin is a part-time teacher at South Bank Engineering UTC. As part of this he invites students from London South Bank University to mentor high school students. In 2019 Martin was awarded an MBE in the Queen's Birthday Honours for services to education, technology and diversity.

=== Awards and honours ===
His awards and honours include;

- 2018 London Tech Week TechXLR8
- 2019 Tech Nation 50 Most Inspiring, Prominent and Influential Black Voices
- 2019 Order of the British Empire
- 2022 UKtech50 2022: The most influential people in UK technology
- 2022 DIVERSITY POWER LIST HONOURS UK’S 50
