= Bob Martin =

Bob Martin may refer to:

== People ==
=== In arts and entertainment ===
- Bob Martin (singer) (1922–1998), Austrian participant in the 1957 Eurovision Song Contest
- Bob Martin (singer-songwriter) (1942–2022), American folk singer-songwriter
- Bob Martin (comedian) (born 1962), star and co-writer of the Broadway musical, The Drowsy Chaperone
- Robert "Bob" Martin (1948–2020), American magazine editor and screenwriter

=== In sports ===
- Bob Martin (American football) (born 1953), American football player
- Bob Martin (basketball) (born 1969), American basketball player
- Bob Martin (boxer) (1897–1978), American boxer and soldier
- Bob Martin (curler), (born c. 1953), English curler
- Bob Martin (golfer) (1848–1917), British golfer
- Bob Martin (rower) (1925–2012), American rower

=== Other people ===
- Bob Martin (Australian politician) (born 1945), Member of the New South Wales Legislative Assembly
- Robert C. Martin (born 1952), American software author and consultant, known as Uncle Bob
- Stephen Donaldson (activist) (1946–1996), a.k.a. Bob Martin or Donny the Punk

== Other ==
- Bob Martin (TV series), a British situation comedy
- Bob Martin Petcare, British pet healthcare company

== See also ==
- Bob Martyn (1930–2015), American baseball player
- Robert Martin (disambiguation)
- Bobby Martin (disambiguation)
