= Patrick Martin =

Patrick Martin may refer to:

- Alex Shelley (born 1983), American professional wrestler born Patrick Martin
- Pat Martin (born 1955), Canadian politician
- Pat Martin (baseball) (1894–1949), American Major League Baseball player
- Patrick M. Martin (1924–1968), U.S. Representative from California
- Patrick Martin (Irish politician) (1830–1895), Irish Member of Parliament in the British House of Commons
- Patrick Martin (bobsleigh) (1923–1987), American Olympic bobsledder
- Pat Martin (broadcaster), American broadcaster
- Patrick S. Martin, West Virginia politician
