= Charles Martin (Queensland cricketer) =

Australian cricketer

Personal information
- Born: 15 May 1867; Ipswich, Queensland, Australia
- Died: 1942 (aged 74–75); Sydney, Australia
- Source: Cricinfo, 5 October 2020

Charles Martin (15 May 1867 – 1942) was an Australian cricketer. He played in two first-class matches for Queensland between 1893 and 1894. He was regarded as one of the best batsmen in Queensland in the 1890s.

== Cricket career ==
Martin began his cricket career in Ipswich, where he attended the West End Ipswich School, before moving to Brisbane and joining the Union Cricket Club in 1884. By 1885 he had returned to Ipswich and was playing for the West End Cricket Club and was awarded the club cup for best batting over the year, and he notably scored 96 out of a team total of 122 for West End in the 1884/85 season. By 1888 he was Captain of West End.

In January 1892 an Ipswich paper described Martin as the most "brilliant star" of Ipswich cricket and speculated that if he was able to find form he would be the "most dashing" batsman in Queensland. In March 1892 an Ipswich paper expressed that Martin should join a Brisbane cricket club arguing that he was as good a cricketer as Arthur Coningham, and in April he represented a combined Ipswich XI against a Maryborough XI. By November 1892 he had moved to Brisbane and he was selected for the Brisbane Graziers' Club that month, however the sides opponent, Stanley, objected to his selection, as it was a policy that players be a member of a club for one month before being selected for a match, and he was unable to play, but in December he was able to start playing for the club.

In February 1893 the Ipswich Herald argued that Martin should be selected to represent Queensland, and in March the Queensland Cricket Association announced that he had been selected to represent the State in an Intercolonial match against New South Wales. In April a report described Martin as being a brilliant batsman and fielder, and that month he represented Queensland in its inaugural First-class game against New South Wales scoring 42 not out in the first innings batting at number eight and moving up to open in the second innings but scoring only one. William Hoare was awarded a trophy for his bowling for Queensland after the match and the Ipswich Herald questioned why Martin was not similarly honored for his batting in the game. In November the Graziers cricket club visited Sydney to play local clubs there and it was suggested Martin could impress spectators on Sydney wickets due to being a "hitter" and he had one score of 76 which was chanceless before he was out caught during the tour.

In March 1894 Martin was selected to represent Queensland in its second First-class against New South Wales in Sydney. The Queensland side passed through Ipswich on their way to Sydney and received "hearty cheers" at Ipswich station. In Ipswich it was hoped Martin would uphold his reputation, however he was noted to be "nowhere" in the match in a report, scoring just 2 and 5 in his two innings. In April 1894 he top scored in a match between Graziers and a Combined Brisbane XI with 52. In August he played an innings notably demonstrating his hitting ability, and he expressed he was trying to hit the ball over the grandstand of Exhibition Ground, although he was unsuccessful he did hit many sixes.

In October 1895 it was noted that Martin had not played for the Graziers in the cricket season yet, and in November it was reported he was taking a break from cricket. He returned to cricket with Graziers in January 1896 scoring 35 in fourteen minutes, and in April he scored 48 in an innings and hit the ball out of the ground twice. Graziers won the Brisbane cricket premiership for the season. In late 1897 Martin returned to Ipswich from Brisbane and it was suggested he would likely join one of the weaker Ipswich sides, and he was playing for the Stars club as of November. By 1899 he had fallen into obscurity, and an Ipswich report of a C. Martin who had scored 210 in Brisbane speculated he may be the Ipswich Martin.

== See also ==
- List of Queensland first-class cricketers
