= Michael Martyn =

Michael Martyn or Mick Martyn may refer to:

- Mick Martyn (Australian footballer) (born 1968), AFL footballer
- Mick Martyn (rugby league) (1936–2017), British rugby league footballer

== See also ==
- Michael Martin (disambiguation)
- Mick Martin (born 1951), Irish footballer
