= Albert Martin =

Albert Martin may refer to:

- Albert Martin (pentathlete) (1927–2003), British Olympic modern pentathlete
- Albert Martin (sailor), Scottish sailor
- Albert Martin (soldier) (1808–1836), defender of the Alamo
- Albert C. Martin Sr. (1879–1960), Los Angeles architect
- Albert C. Martin Jr. (1913–2006), Los Angeles architect
- Albert Edward Martin (1876–1936), English merchant and politician
- Albert H. Martin (1859–1932), Newfoundland politician
- Albert N. Martin (1934–2026), American minister
- Al Martin (Albert Lee Martin, born 1967), left fielder in Major League Baseball
- Al Martin (second baseman) (Albert DeGroot 1847–1915)

== See also ==
- Alberto Martín (born 1978), tennis player from Spain
- Albert De Martin (born 1951), politician from Quebec, Canada
- Al Martin (disambiguation)
