= Charles Martin =

Charles Martin may refer to:

== Sports ==
- Charles Martin (American football) (1959–2005), American football player
- Charles Martin (boxer) (born 1986), American heavyweight boxer
- Charles Martin (English cricketer) (1836–1878), English cricketer
- Charles Martin (South Australia cricketer) (1863-1954), Australian cricketer
- Charles Martin (Tasmania cricketer) (1888–1951), Australian cricketer
- Charles Martin (Queensland cricketer) (1867–1942), Australian cricketer

== Politics and government ==
- Charles D. Martin (politician) (1829–1911), U.S. representative from Ohio
- Charles J. Martin (California politician) (1839–1912), French-born American mayor of San Jose, California
- Charles H. Martin (North Carolina politician) (1848–1931), U.S. representative from North Carolina
- Charles Martin (Canadian politician) (1881–1957), member of the Ontario Legislative Assembly
- Charles Martin (Alabama politician) (1931–2012), American politician
- Charles Martin (Illinois politician) (1856–1917), U. S. representative from Illinois
- Charles Wykeham Martin (1801–1870), English Liberal Party politician
- Charles Martin (Oregon politician) (1863–1946), U.S. military officer, governor and representative from Oregon
- Workneh Eshete (1864-1952), Ethiopian doctor and diplomat who took the name Charles Martin

== Arts and literature ==
- Charles James Martin (artist) (1886–1955), American modernist artist and arts instructor
- Charles Martin (1820–1906), British artist, son of John Martin
- Charles Martin (artist) (1884–1934), French artist and illustrator
- Charles Martin (1562–1646), French painter of King Henry IV of France
- Charles Martin (poet) (born 1942), American poet and educator
- Charles Martin (author) (born 1969), American author
- Charles G. Martin (actor) (born 1912), American actor known for The Shootist with John Wayne

== Science ==
- Charles Martin (physiologist) (Charles James Martin, 1866–1955), British scientist
- Charles R. Martin (born 1959), American professor of chemistry

== Other ==
- Charles Martin (educator) (1817–1888), acting president of Hampden–Sydney College (1848–1849, 1856–1857)
- Charles D. Martin (minister) (1873–1942), West Indian Moravian minister
- Charles A. Martin, chief scout of the Boy Scouts of South Africa
- Charles Charrington Martin (1854–1926), British actor and barrister
- Charles Irving Martin (1871–1953), American military officer
- Charles H. Martin (pilot) (1894–1918), Australian pilot

== See also ==
- Charlie Martin (disambiguation)
- Chuck Martin (disambiguation)
