= Robert Martin =

Robert Martin may refer to:

== Politicians ==
- Robert N. Martin (1798–1870), American politician, U.S. representative from Maryland
- Robert Martin (Oklahoma governor) (1833–1897), American politician, governor of Oklahoma Territory, 1891–1892
- Robert Martin (New Jersey politician) (born 1947), New Jersey state senator
- Robert Martin (Canadian politician) (1858–1942), pharmacist and political figure in Saskatchewan, Canada

== Sports ==
- Robert Martin (bobsleigh) (1900–1942), American bobsledder
- Robert Martin (cricketer) (1918–1985), English cricketer
- Robby Martin (born 1999), American baseball player

== Others ==
- Robert R. Martin (1902–1950), United States Army officer
- Robert Martin (singer) (born 1948), American singer, songwriter and musician
- Robert Martin (editor) (1948–2020), American magazine editor and screenwriter
- Robert Martin (audio engineer) (1916–1992), American audio engineer
- Robert Martin, bass player with Curved Air
- Robert Martin (cinematographer) (1891–1980), American cinematographer
- Robert Martin (anti-war activist) (born 1949), Australian conscientious objector to the Vietnam War
- Robert Bernard Martin (1918–1999), American scholar of Victorian literature
- Robert Montgomery Martin (1801–1868), British author and civil servant
- Robert C. Martin (born 1952), software professional and co-author of the Agile Manifesto
- Robert fitz Martin (died c. 1159), Norman knight and first Lord of Cemais, Wales
- Robert Hugh Martin (1896–1918), World War I heart patient pioneer
- Robert S. Martin (born 1949), American librarian, director of the Institute of Museum and Library Services
- Stephen Donaldson (activist) (Robert Anthony Martin, Jr, 1946–1996), American LGBT and prison activist
- Robert Martin (aviator) (1919–2018), Tuskegee airman during WW2
- Robert Martin (disability rights activist) (1957–2024), New Zealand activist for the rights of people with intellectual disability
- Robert D. Martin (born 1942), British-born biological anthropologist
- Rob Martin (bishop), bishop of Marsabit in the Anglican Church of Kenya
- Robert Martin (academic administrator), president of the Institute of American Indian Arts in Santa Fe, New Mexico
- Robert Martin, a fictional character from Marvel Comics, father of Chip Martin (see List of Marvel Comics characters: S#Schizoid Man)

== See also ==
- Bob Martin (disambiguation)
- Bobby Martin (disambiguation)
