= Justice Martin =

Justice Martin may refer to:

- Brian Ross Martin (born 1947), judge of the Supreme Court of South Australia and a chief justice of the Supreme Court of the Northern Territory
- Celora E. Martin (1834–1909), judge of the New York Court of Appeals
- Charles D. Martin (politician) (1829–1911), member of Supreme Court Commission of Ohio
- Clarence R. Martin (1886–1972), associate justice and chief justice of the Indiana Supreme Court
- David Martin (Kansas judge) (1839–1901), associate justice of the Kansas Supreme Court
- Francois Xavier Martin (1762–1846), chief justice of the Louisiana Supreme Court
- George Martin (Michigan judge) (1815–1867), associate justice of the Michigan Supreme Court
- George Ewing Martin (1857–1948), chief justice of the United States Court of Appeals for the District of Columbia
- Harry Martin (judge) (1920–2015), associate justice of the North Carolina Supreme Court
- John E. Martin (1891–1968), chief justice of the Wisconsin Supreme Court
- Joseph Martin (Wisconsin politician) (1878–1946), associate justice of the Wisconsin Supreme Court
- Mark Martin (judge) (born 1963), chief justice of the North Carolina Supreme Court
- Robert N. Martin (1798–1870), judge of the Maryland Court of Appeals
- Wheeler Martin (1765–1836), associate justice of the Rhode Island Supreme Court
- William Bond Martin (c. 1769–1835), judge of the Maryland Court of Appeals

== See also ==
- Martin Beddoe, circuit judge of England and Wales
- Judge Martin (disambiguation)
