= Bernice Fenwick Martin =

Canadian painter and printmaker

- Born: July 7, 1902; Shelburne, Ontario, Canada
- Died: 1999 (aged 96–97); Toronto, Ontario, Canada
- Known for: Painter, Printmaker

Bernice Fenwick Martin (July 7, 1902 – 1999) was a Canadian painter and printmaker known for her landscapes.

== Biography ==
Laura Bernice Fenwick was born July 7, 1902, in Shelburne, Ontario to William Alfred Fenwick and Sarah Rouse. She married her husband Langton Martin (1903–1974), who was an artist as well. She began her art studies at Toronto Technical Schools. She continued her education throughout the 1920s and 1930s at the Ontario College of Art. Her teachers included John William Beatty and Group of Seven painter Franklin Carmichael.

In 1941, Martin met the artist Peter Clapham Sheppard and the two were sketching companions until Sheppard's death in 1965.

From 1945 to 1947, Martin's work was included in the Royal Canadian Academy of Arts exhibitions. She held one woman shows at Eaton's College Street Fine Art Galleries in Toronto, at the Casa Loma also in Toronto, and at the Hamilton Art Gallery.

Martin was a member of the Society of Canadian Painter-Etchers and Engravers, and the Print and Drawing Council of Canada.

Martin died in 1999 in Toronto.
