= Mark Martin (disambiguation) =

Mark Martin (born 1959) is an American racecar driver.

Mark Martin may also refer to:

- Mark Martin (politician) (born 1968), Arkansas Secretary of State
- Mark Martin (cartoonist) (born 1956), American cartoonist
- Mark Martin (judge) (born 1963), American judge
- Mark Martin (murderer) (born 1979), British serial killer
- Mark Martin (educator), British educator

== See also ==
- Weather Wizard, also known as Mark Mardon
