= Allan Martin =

Allan Martin may refer to:

- A. W. Martin (Allan William Martin, 1926–2002), Australian historian
- Allan Martin (footballer) (1872–1906), Scottish footballer
- Allan Martin (rugby union) (born 1948), Wales and British Lions international rugby union player
- Allan Martin (TV producer) (born 1926), New Zealand TV producer, director and senior field and track athlete
- Allan W. Martin (1874–1942), member of the Vermont House of Representatives and the Vermont Senate

== See also ==
- Alan Martin (disambiguation)
- Allen Martin (1844–1924), English sailor who founded a private school at Port Adelaide, sometimes misspelt Allan Martin
