= Alfred Martin =

Alfred Martin may refer to:

- Alf Martin, British footballer, secretary-manager of Lincoln City F.C. in 1896/1897
- Alfred Martin (baseball) (1928–1989), known as Billy, American baseball player
- Alfred Martin (painter) (1888–1950), Belgian artist; see Catalog of paintings in the Louvre Museum
- Alfred Martin (Indian Army officer) (1853–1926), British officer in the Indian Army

== See also ==
- Al Martin (disambiguation)
- Alfred Ridley-Martin (1881–1970), British fencer
- Alfred Marten (1829–1910), politician
