= Wayne Martin =

Wayne Martin is the name of:

- Wayne Martin (American football) (born 1965), American football defensive lineman
- Wayne Martin (Branch Davidian) (1950–1993), lawyer and Branch Davidian
- Wayne Martin (cricketer, born 1953) (1953–2026), New Zealand cricketer
- Wayne Martin (cricketer, born 1955) (born 1955), New Zealand cricketer
- Wayne Martin (footballer) (born 1965), English footballer
- Wayne Martin (judge) (born 1952), Chief Justice of Western Australia
