= Vince Martin =

Vince or Vincent Martin may refer to:

- Vince Martin (actor) (born 1955), Australian actor
- Vince Martin (politician) (1920–2001), Australian politician
- Vince Martin (singer) (1937–2018), American folk singer
- Vincent Martin (born 1960), birth name of Vince Clarke, English musician, songwriter, member of Erasure
- Vincent Martin (rugby union) (born 1992), French rugby union player
- Vincent A. Martin (1870–1951), member of the Michigan Senate
- Vincent P. Martin (born 1968), Irish politician
- Rhyging (1924–1948), Jamaican criminal whose real name was Vincent Martin
