= Mary Martin (disambiguation) =

Mary Martin (1913–1990) was an American actress and singer.

Mary Martin may also refer to:

- Mary A. Martin (1923–2014), American politician
- Mary Evelyn Martin (1919–1978), British wife of politician Quintin Hogg, Baron Hailsham of Saint Marylebone
- Mary Letitia Martin (1815–1850), Irish writer
- Mary Martin (teacher) (1817–1884), New Zealand community leader, teacher and writer
- Mary Ward (suffragist) (née Martin; 1851–1933), Irish suffragist
- Mary Martin (missionary) (1892–1975), Irish missionary
- Mary Martin (artist) (1907–1969), British sculptor
- Mary Martin (netball) (1915–1988), New Zealand netball player
- Mary Maydwell Martin (1915–1973), Australian bookseller
- Mary Brandon Martin, founder of Lower Brandon Plantation
- Mary Martin (silent film actress) (active 1910s), American actress
- María Martín (actress) (1923–2014), Spanish actress, occasionally credited as Maria Martin
- Mary Martín (1927–1982), Spanish-Mexican artist
- Marty Wyall (born Mary Anna Martin, 1922–2017)
- Mary T. Martin Sloop (1873–1962), née Martin, American medical doctor, involved in healthcare and education reform

== See also ==
- The Mary Martin Show, a 2000 song by The New Pornographers, from the album Mass Romantic
- Mary Gabriel Martyn (1604–1672), abbess of the Poor Clares of Galway
