= Pierre Martin =

Pierre Martin can refer to:

- Frenchy Martin (1947–2016), French professional wrestler
- Pierre Martin (cyclist) (born 1938), French cyclist
- Pierre Martin (French Navy officer) (1752–1820)
- Pierre Martin (politician) (1943–2023), French senator of the Somme department
- Pierre Martin (engineer) (1932–1986), French spelunker who explored caves in Brazil
- Buster Martin (Pierre Jean Martin, 1906–2011), claimed to be the United Kingdom's oldest employee

== See also ==
- Pierre-Émile Martin (1824–1915), French industrial engineer
