= Alan Martin =

Alan Martin may refer to:

- Alan Martin (Australian rules footballer) (1928–2004), Australian rules footballer
- Alan Martin (footballer, born 1923) (1923–2004), English football player
- Alan Martin (footballer, born 1989), Scottish football goalkeeper for Queen of the South
- Alan Martin (writer), co-creator of Tank Girl
- Alan Martin (physicist) (born 1937), British physicist
- Alan Gray Martin (born 1930), Canadian parliamentarian

== See also ==
- Allan Martin (disambiguation)
- Al Martin (disambiguation)
