= Bob Martin (singer-songwriter) =

American folk singer-songwriter (1942–2022)

Bob Martin (January 18, 1942 – September 21, 2022) from Lowell, Massachusetts, was an American folk singer-songwriter.

== Biography ==
While attending Suffolk University in Boston during the 1960s, he was influenced by the Cambridge folk scene and played at the Nameless Coffeehouse, Club 47 (now Club Passim), and other folk clubs. In 1972, he went to Nashville and recorded his first album, Midwest Farm Disaster. In 1974, he became disillusioned with music and moved to a farm in West Virginia with his family. In 1982, he recorded his second album, Last Chance Rider. He gave up music once again, this time for ten years, until the release of his third album in 1992. This album, The River Turns the Wheel, contained backing vocals by Bill Morrissey and Cormac McCarthy. Martin continued performing nationally afterward, opening for Merle Haggard in 1999.

== Discography ==
- Midwest Farm Disaster (RCA Victor, 1972)
- Last Chance Rider (June Appal Recordings, 1982)
- The River Turns the Wheel (1997)
- Next to Nothin' (2000)
- Live at The Bull Run (2010)
- Seabrook (2023)
