= Ernest Martin =

Ernest Martin may refer to:

- Ernest Martin (murderer) (1960–2003), American executed by the State of Ohio for murder
- Ernest Martin (theatre) (born 1932), theatre director and manager
- Ernest H. Martin (1919–1995), Broadway producer
- Ernest L. Martin (1932–2002), meteorologist and author on Biblical topics
- Ernie Martin (1903–1996), Australian rules footballer
- Ernest Martin (swimmer) (1878–?), French Olympic swimmer and water polo player
- Ernest William Lunn Martin (1888–1980), British religious missionary, educator, and author
