= Lewis Martin =

Lewis Martin may refer to:

- Lewis J. Martin (1844–1913), U.S. Representative from New Jersey
- Lewis Martin (actor) (1895–1974), American actor
- Lewis Martin (Australian politician) (1872–1944), member of the New South Wales Legislative Assembly
- Lewis Martin (footballer) (born 1996), Scottish footballer for Dunfermline Athletic
- Lewis Martin (rugby league) (born 2004), English rugby league player for Hull FC

== See also ==
- Ingrid Lewis-Martin (born 1961), American political advisor
- Louis Martin (disambiguation)
