= Philipp Leopold Martin =

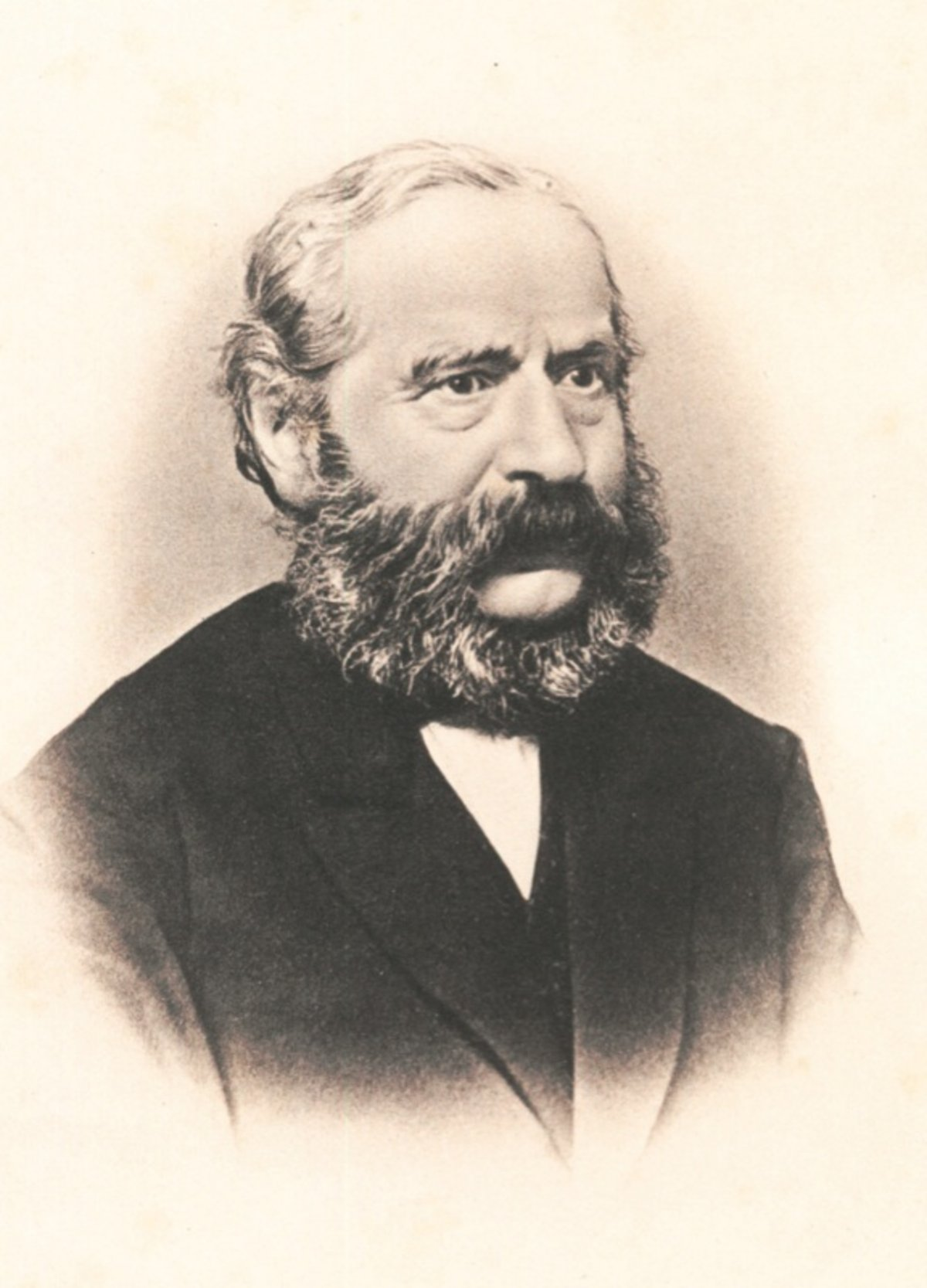

Philipp Leopold Martin (5 November 1815 – 7 March 1885) was a German taxidermist, naturalist, and a popularizer of natural history. He was self-taught and was involved in early proposals for bird and animal conservation efforts in Germany and was among the first to use the term "Naturschutz" [nature conservation]. He published a three volume work on taxidermy, dioramas, zoo design, and museum displays for natural history education titled "Praxis der Naturgeschichte" in which he used the word "museology", possibly for the first time in 1869.

== Biography ==
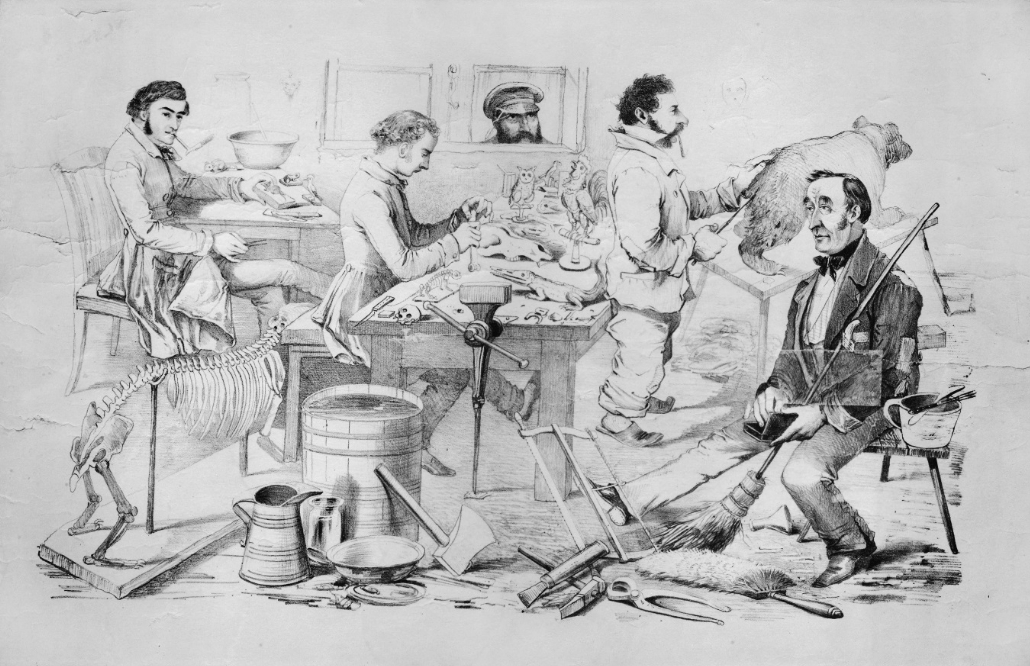
The taxidermy workshop in Stuttgart in 1863 showing (left to right) Georg Jaeger, Dr. Ferdinand Krauss, P.L. Martin, and Findt. Caricature by F. Schlotterbeck in the State Museum of Natural History, Stuttgart.

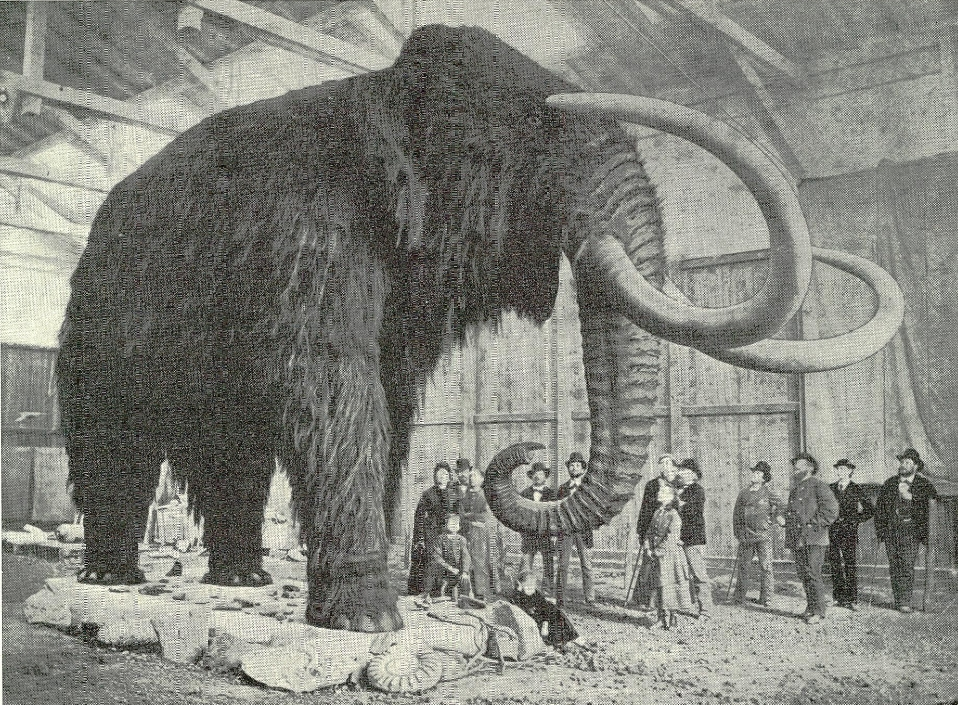
Martin's reconstruction of the mammoth, 1875

Martin was born in Gnadenberg (near what is now Bolesławiec) where his father, Christian Gottlieb, was a baker and his mother was Sophie née Zwick. He became interested in nature after reading the travel descriptions of Moravian missionaries who lived in their community. He also visited the natural history cabinet at Niesky and began to study taxidermy and worked for a natural history dealer in Bolesławiec. He married Ida Grubert in 1840. In 1848-49 he visited Venezuela along with his wife and the artist Carl Ferdinand Appun with the aim of collecting specimens and taking photographs for the Berlin museum. Their proposal was supported by Alexander von Humboldt and Hinrich Lichtenstein. His wife died in Venezuela in 1849 and he returned sick. He worked the next two years at Halle and Halbertstadt and began to work for Count Kazimierz Wodzicki in Galicia.

In 1852, thanks to Martin Hinrich Lichtenstein, he obtained a position as a taxidermist at the zoological museum in Berlin. He married Charlotte Amalie Valeska née Beck in 1854 and they had two sons, Oskar (1854-1891) who became a taxidermist and Carl Oswald Paul (1861-1937) who became a professor of veterinary medicine at Giessen. In 1859 he moved to the Royal Natural History Cabinet (Konigliche Naturalien-Sammlung) in Stuttgart becoming its curator in 1861. In 1862 he was involved in setting up an "acclimatization garden" under royal decree but this ended with the death of King William I of Württemberg in 1864. In 1865 he helped in an exhibition of prehistoric animals at Stuttgart, preparing replicas of extinct animals. He was guided by the works of Oscar Fraas who had excavated several fossils including Nicrosaurus, and had discovered human remains from the ice age. This was also taken to the Paris World Fair in 1867. In his 1869 volume in the three-volume work "Praxis der Naturgeschichte" (1869–1882) on the practice of natural history exhibits including taxidermy, he used the title "museology", possibly for the first time. In 1872 he was involved in founding an association of bird lovers in Württemberg and headed it. In a series of essays published in 1871, he used the word "naturschutz" (nature conservation) while discussing animal protection. He also suggested the creation of sanctuaries. He resigned from his position at the Royal Natural History Cabinet in 1874 and established a private museum (Museum der Urwelt) of prehistory within Nills' Menagerie, the main attraction being a life-sized mammoth. Other exhibits included the Nicrosaurus or Neckar crocodile. The museum was closed four years later and he began to focus on writing. The mammoth was acquired by Henry Ward of Rochester (for the 2020 equivalent of US$500,000) who made more replicas and sold them to museums in the United States. Each replica earned Ward 14,000 Marks according to Martin. One replica went to the Museum of Natural History in Charlottesville, Virginia. In his 1874 essay "Das Vergiften der Feldmäuse und seine Folgen" [the poisoning of fieldmice and the consequences] Martin notes how the poison affects birds of prey and predatory animals along the food-chain many of which are actually helpful and disregarded by farmers in their "materialist" pursuit of yields.
