= Jesse Martin (disambiguation) =

Jesse Martin may refer to:

- Jesse Martin (born 1981), German-Australian sailor
- Jesse B. Martin (1897–1974), Canadian bishop
- Jesse M. Martin (1877–1915), American politician
- Jesse L. Martin (born 1969), American actor/singer
- Jesse Martin (born 1977), Sports Administrator
