= Nicholas Martin =

Nicholas or Nick Martin, or Martyn may refer to:

- Nicholas Martyn (1593–1653), MP
- Nick Martin (musician) (born 1982), American musician and guitarist for Sleeping with Sirens
- Nik Martin (musician), American musician
- Nicholas G. Martin (born 1950), behavior geneticist
- Nick Martin (educator), American technologist, entrepreneur and educator
- Nick Martin (center) (born 1993), American football player
- Nick Martin (linebacker) (born 2002), American football player
- Nic Martin (born 2001), Australian rules footballer
- Miklós Martin (1931–2019), Hungarian water polo player, known as Nick
- Nick R. Martin, American journalist
- Nick Martin (rugby union) (born 1946), English rugby union player
- Nicholas Martin (director) of The Cherry Orchard
- Nicholas Martin, screenwriter of the film Florence Foster Jenkins
- Nicholas Martin (baseball), see 2010–11 Australian Baseball League regular season
- Nicholas Martin (sailor), see 2011 ISAF Sailing World Championships – Men's 470
- Nic Martin, known professionally as UNO Stereo, Australian record producer
