= Ted Martin =

Ted Martin may refer to:

- Ted Martin (cricketer) (1902–2004), Australian cricketer
- Ted Martin (footballer) (1910–1990), English footballer
- Theodore D. Martin (born 1960), United States Army general
- W. T. Martin (1911–2004), known as Ted, American mathematician
