= Adam Martin =

Adam Martin may refer to:

- Adam Martin (singer) on The Voice (Australia series 1)
- Adam Martin (politician) (1739–1818) American politician and Revolutionary War officer.
- Adam Martin (cyclist) in 2013 UCI Cyclo-cross World Championships – Men's under-23 race
