= Pamela Martin =

Pamela Martin may refer to:

- Pamela Martin (television reporter) (born 1953), American-born television reporter on Canadian TV
- Pamela Martin (film editor), American film editor
- Pamela Sue Martin (born 1953), American actress
- Pamela Martin (lawyer), South Australian lawyer
- Pamela J. Martin, materials scientist

== See also ==
- Deborah Jeane Palfrey (1956–2008), operated Pamela Martin and Associates, an escort agency in Washington, D.C
