= South Bank University Sixth Form =

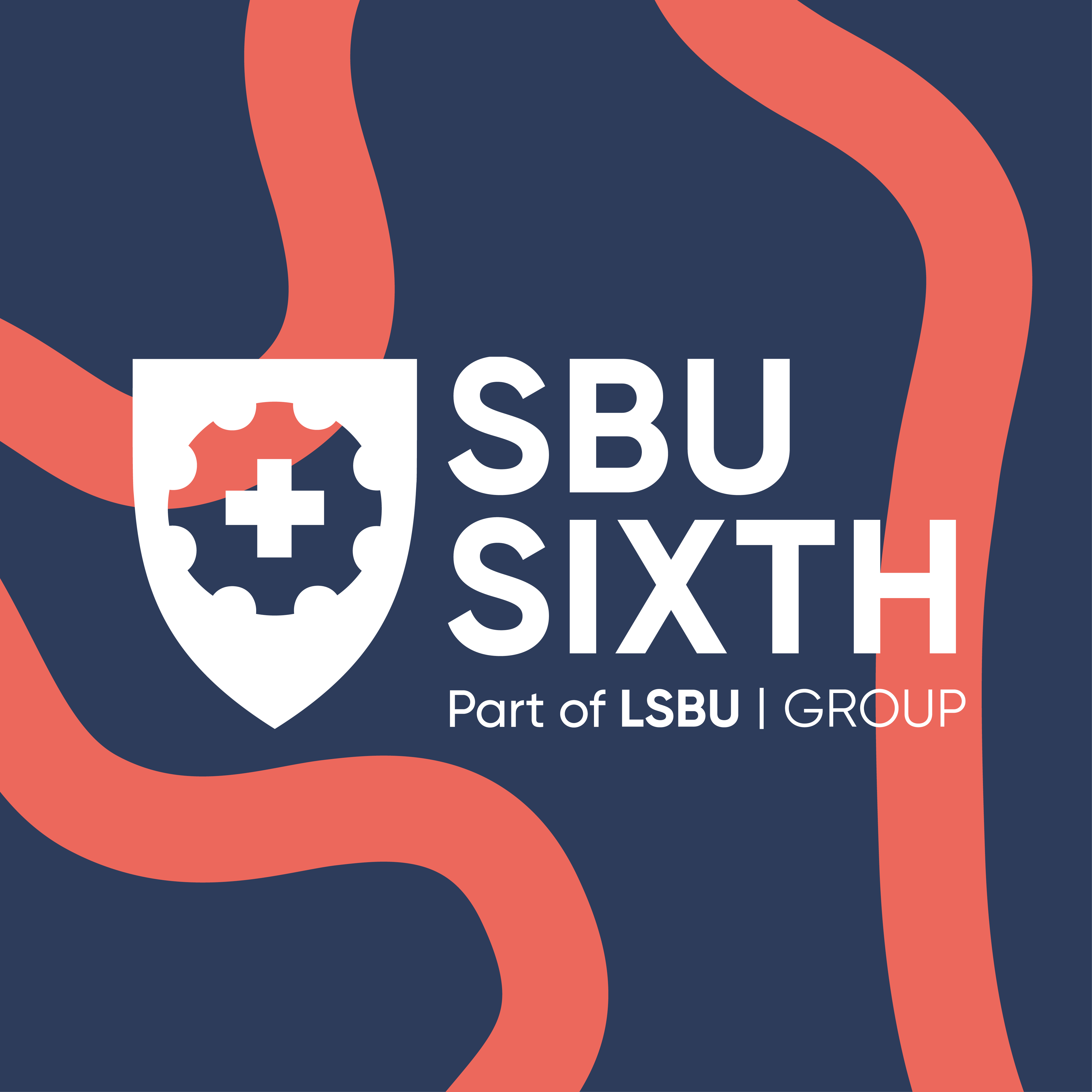

Location
- Brixton Hill; Brixton; London, SW2 1QS; England; 51°27′25″N 0°07′19″W

Information
- Type: Academy sixth form
- Established: 2016
- Local authority: Lambeth
- Trust: South Bank Academies
- Department for Education URN: 150380 Tables
- Ofsted: Reports
- Principal: Principal
- Age: 16 to 19
- Website: https://www.sbusixth.ac.uk/

South Bank University Sixth Form is a sixth form centre with academy status located in the Brixton area of the London Borough of Lambeth, England. The academy offers A-levels, T-Levels and BTECs as programmes of study in collaboration with employers. Its focus is on engineering, business and healthcare in line with key skills needs of the local area.

== History ==
South Bank Engineering was established as a University Technical College in September 2016, with a capacity for 600 pupils. The UTC was sponsored by London South Bank University, Guy's and St Thomas' NHS Foundation Trust, King's College Hospital NHS Foundation Trust and Skanska.

In September 2023 South Bank UTC was re-registered as an academy sixth form, changing its lower age intake to 16. The institution was renamed South Bank University Sixth Form, and continues to be sponsored by London South Bank University, as part of South Bank Academies. The new sixth form concept was part of the LSBU Group and created educational pathways into employment, apprenticeships, college or university.
