= Fernando Martínez (journalist) =

- Born: Fernando de Matos Martínez; 15 July 1978 (age 47); São Paulo, Brazil
- Occupations: Journalist, photographer, historian
- Years active: 2004–
- Known for: Participated in the coverage of more than 3,000 football matches in Brazil
- Website: Jogos Perdidos

Fernando de Matos Martínez (born 15 July 1978) is a Brazilian journalist, blogger, historian and photographer.

== Biography ==
Martínez is responsible for covering more than 3 thousand football matches in Brazil (possibly the all-time record), among lower divisions, youth categories and women's football. He is known for having maintained the blog "Jogos Perdidos" (English: Lost Matches) for over 20 years, and for having participated in sports programs on RedeTV. During the 2014 FIFA World Cup, he achieved the feat of watching three football matches of the competition on the same day, in three different Brazilian states. He was also a journalist who was the reference for the creation of the book 125 Years of History of Football in São Paulo, an official document of the São Paulo Football Federation, alongside great names such as Celso Unzelte. He also occasionally participated as a guest on the program "Futebol Alternativo TV", on AllTV.

In 2025 Martínez was the main author of the book that told the story of the Copa São Paulo de Futebol Júnior.

== Bibliography ==
- Rodolfo Kussarev, Bernardo Itri (2021). 125 Anos de História – A Enciclopédia do Futebol Paulista (in Portuguese). FPF. ISBN 659960630X.
- Fernando Martínez; Rodolfo Kussarev (2025). Copa São Paulo de Futebol Júnior - A História da Copinha (in Portuguese). São Paulo: FPF.
