= Trevor Martin (disambiguation) =

Trevor Martin (1929–2017) was a British actor.

Trevor Martin may also refer to:

- Trevor Martin (umpire) (1925–2017), New Zealand test cricket umpire
- Trevor Martin (baseball) (born 2000), American baseball player
- Trevor Martin, computer scientist and inventor of computer language Fril
