= Peter Clapham Sheppard =

Canadian artist (1879-1965)

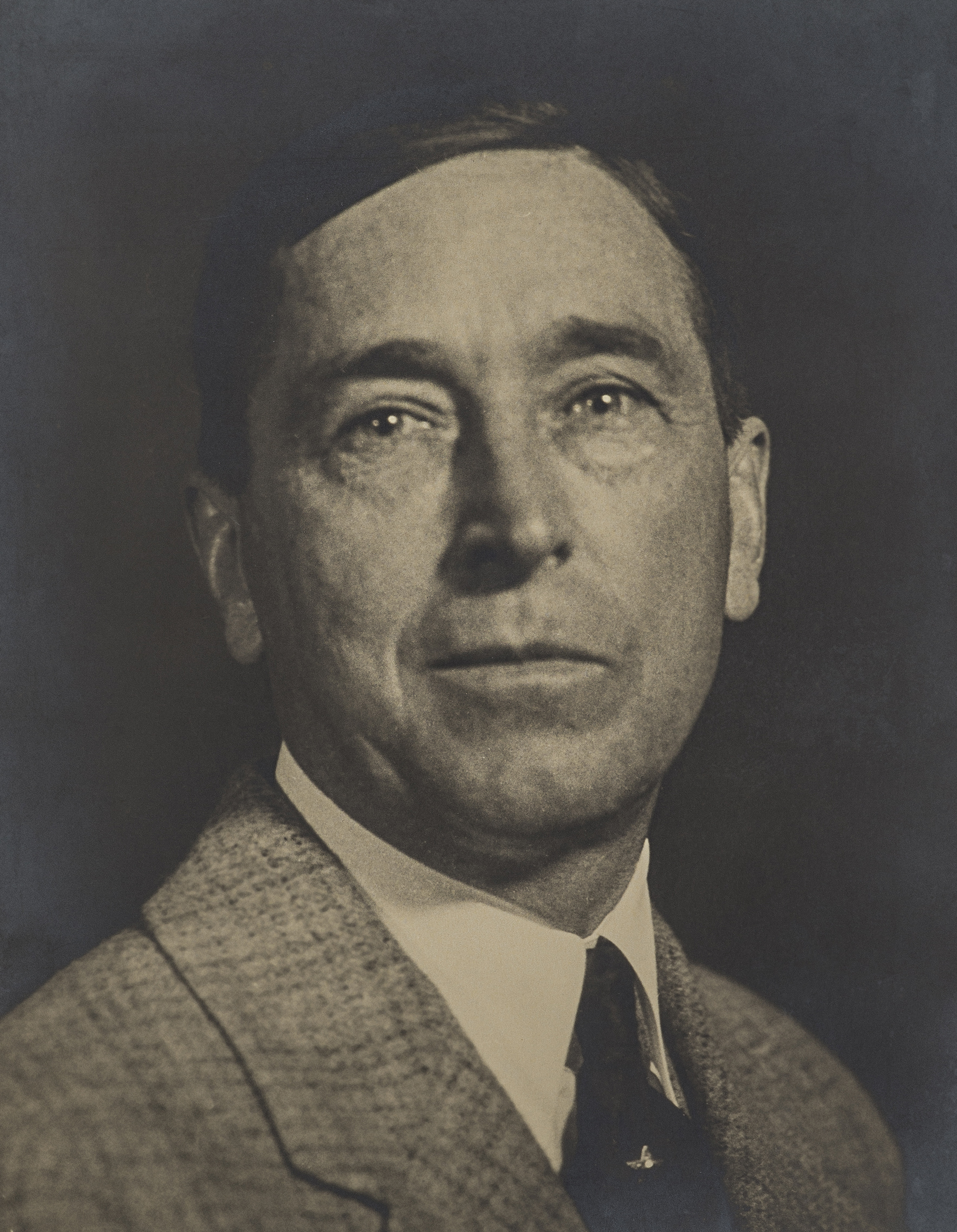
- Peter Clapham Sheppard, 1930
- Born: October 21, 1879; Toronto, Ontario
- Died: April 24, 1965 (aged 85); Newmarket, Ontario
- Education: Central Ontario School of Art and Design with William Cruikshank, George Agnew Reid and J. W. Beatty (1911-1914)
- Elected: A.R.C.A. (1929); O.S.A. (1918)
- Website: https://www.pcsheppard.com

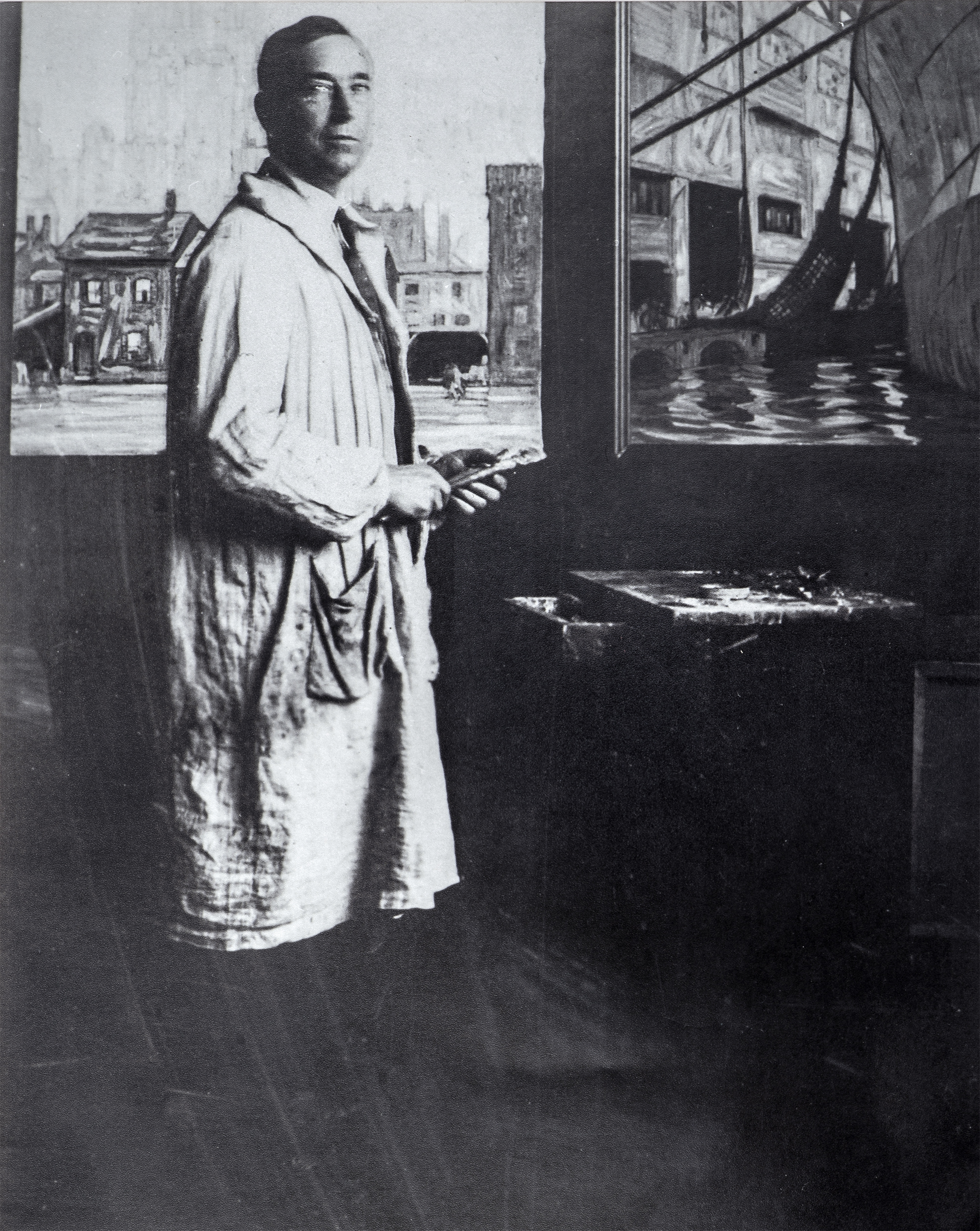
Peter Clapham Sheppard, at work in his Toronto studio, with paintings in the background: Three Old Houses, Louisa Street (left) and Sea Port/Ocean Freighter (right), c.1929-30

Peter Clapham Sheppard (October 21, 1879 – April 24, 1964), also known as P. C. Sheppard (as he signed his work) and as Peter C. Sheppard, was a Canadian painter, known for his figurative work and for his city and landscape scenes.

== Career ==
Peter Clapham Sheppard was born in Toronto on October 21, 1879. As a young man, he worked in commercial art, serving an apprenticeship in lithography at a Toronto commercial lithography company. From 1911–1914, he attended the Central Ontario School of Art and Industrial Design, studying with William Cruikshank, George Agnew Reid and J. W. Beatty. By 1912, his paintings showed the influence of Impressionism. He received many awards during his school years, and a Diploma for Painting in 1913–1914. After he graduated, he taught at the school's summer sessions in Hoggs Hollow. From 1917, he made a living working full-time as an artist, attracted to industrial subjects and combining them with figures - he particularly enjoyed recording the human presence, and views of the city in Montreal as well as Toronto and New York in which he was influenced - unusually for Canada - by John Sloan. From 1925–1927, he was in Montreal, painting impressionistically city streets, cab stands and market scenes. His work gradually became Post-Impressionist as he painted oil sketches of harbour and landscape. In 1929, he returned to Toronto. In the 1930s, he chose subjects in the Ward area of Toronto.

Sheppard showed his work at the Royal Canadian Academy from 1915 to 1954 (he was elected an associate in 1929), the Art Association of Montreal from 1916–1950, the Ontario Society of Artists (1912–1946) (he became a member in 1918), the Canadian National Exhibition, the British Empire Exhibition in 1925, and other major exhibitions, such as the 1939 New York World's Fair.

Sheppard's work is represented in public collections such as the Art Gallery of Ontario, and the National Gallery of Canada. He died in Newmarket, Ontario on April 24, 1965.

== After his death ==
After a long life dedicated to painting, Sheppard died in 1965. It took another two decades for his work to be discovered by Louis Gagliardi, an educator who endeavoured to bring renewed attention to this artist, believing that Sheppard's work was rich in the history of early 20th century cities. Thanks to Gagliardi, Sheppard's work has returned to prominence.

In 2010, Sheppard's works were included in the Defiant Spirits: The Modernist Revolution of the Group of Seven exhibition at the McMichael Canadian Art Collection in Kleinburg, Ontario, guest curated by Ross King.

== Record sale prices ==
Sheppard's Cabstand, Montreal, a 24 x 30 inch, 1927 oil on canvas sold for $157,250 CAD (premium included) at Heffel's Canadian, Impressionist & Modern Art auction on May 29, 2019. His Market a 24 x 31 1/2 inch, 1925 oil on canvas sold for: $99,450 CDN (premium included) at Heffel's Canadian, Impressionist & Modern Art auction, Spring 2013 - 2nd Session on Wednesday, May 15, 2013.

The highest price realized was for Elizabeth Street, a 30 in x 36 in. canvas, which Waddington's sold in 2018 for $204,000 CAD (premium included).

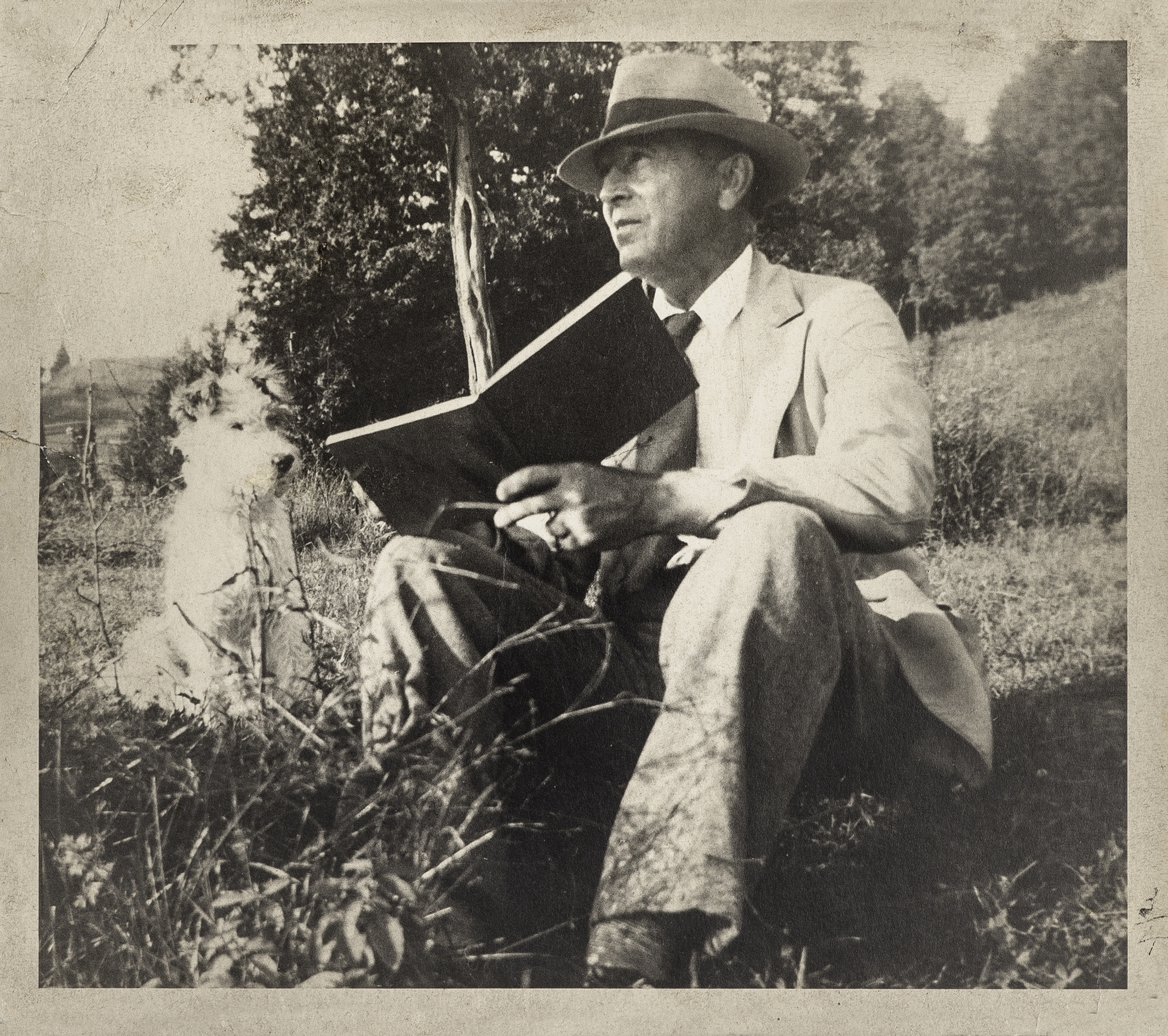
Peter Clapham Sheppard painting Haliburton Waterfall, October 1941.
