= Francis Martin =

Francis Martin may refer to:

- Francis Martin (priest) (1652–1722), Irish Augustinian
- Francis W. Martin (1878–1947), American lawyer, first district attorney of the Bronx
- F. X. Martin (Francis Xavier Martin, 1922–2000), Irish cleric, historian and activist
- Francis Martin (biblical scholar) (1930–2017), American priest
- Francis Martin (runner) (1924–?), American runner
- Francis Martin (musician) (born 1968), Canadian musician and author
- Francis Marion Martin (1830–1903), lieutenant governor of Texas

== See also ==
- Frank Martin (disambiguation)
- François Martin (disambiguation)
