= Charles H. Martin (pilot) =

WW1 Australian fighter pilot

Charles Henry Martin
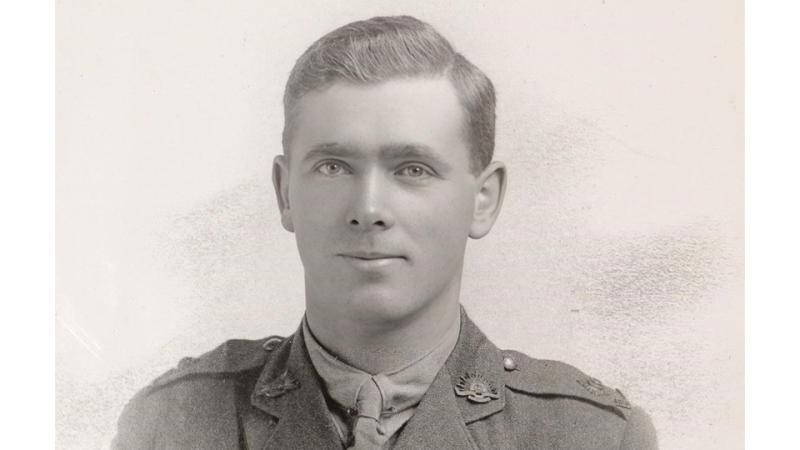
- Martin in uniform
- Born: 1 April 1894; Port Melbourne, Australia
- Died: 17 February 1918 (aged 23); Near Lille, France
- Burial place: Rue-David Military Cemetery, Fleurbaix
- Relatives: Charles Henry Martin (father); Louisa Rose Martin (mother); I. G. Martin (brother); F. E. Martin (brother)
- Military career
- Branch: Australian Army: Australian Flying Corps
- Service years: 1916-1918
- Rank: Lieutenant
- Service number: 6144
- Units: 6th Infantry Battalion; No. 4 Squadron
- Conflicts: World War I: Western Front †

Lieutenant Charles Henry Martin (1 April 1894 - 17 February 1918) was an Australian pilot serving in the Australian Flying Corps during World War I, notably with the No. 4 Squadron.

== Early life and personal life ==
Charles Henry Martin was born on 1 April 1894 at Port Melbourne in Melbourne, Australia to Charles Henry Martin and his wife Louisa Rose Martin. He was the eldest son in the family. He had 2 known brothers that also served in the Australian Army during WW1, Trumpeter I. G Martin and Air Mechanic F. E Martin. They resided at 271 Graham Street, Port Melbourne, Victoria. He was educated in the local State School and worked as a builder before enlisting.

== Early military career ==
Martin enlisted in the Australian Army on 7 February 1916 as an infantryman ranked Private in the 6th Infantry Battalion. Following training, he embarked for Europe aboard SS Themistocles on 28 July 1916. Initially assigned service number 6144, he later transferred to the Australian Flying Corps. After completing pilot training, he was commissioned as a Lieutenant and posted to No. 4 Squadron, which operated the Sopwith Camel fighter aircraft on the Western Front.

== Death and missing in action ==
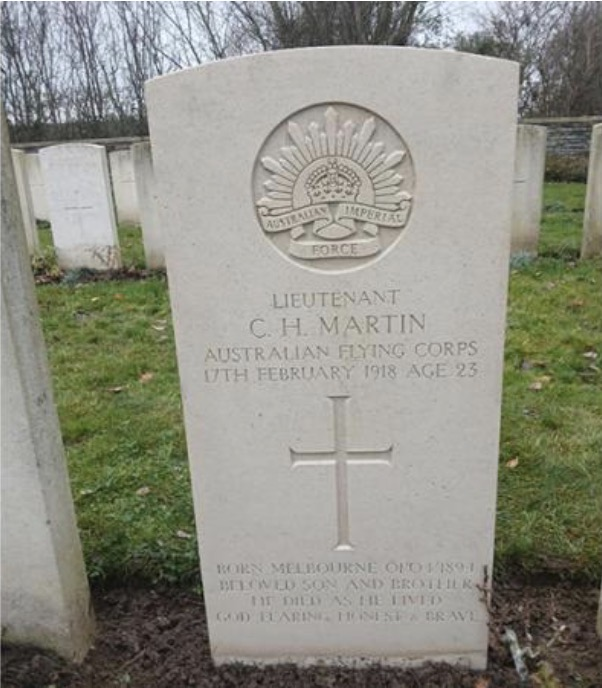
Lieutenant Martin's grave headstone.

On 17 February 1918, Martin was flying a Sopwith F.1 Camel on an offensive patrol, and died when his plane (Camel B2507) was presumably hit by a round of anti-aircraft fire over the German lines west of Lille. Martin's plane had been flying in formation with three other aircraft when it suddenly plummeted downwards, its wings folding back as the aircraft disintegrated. Martin's body was recovered by German troops, and he was given an honourable battlefield burial near the wreckage of his aircraft about 400 yards (370 m) south of the village of Prémesques. The event was later mentioned in the Official history of Australia in the War of 1914-1918. His personal belongings, including his identity discs, were recovered by the Germans and delivered to his family in Port Melbourne, Victoria, via the Red Cross. However, no grave was found by the military authorities. It was presumed Martin was buried in a German cemetery. Martin was later reburied in an Imperial, later Commonwealth, War Grave at the Rue-David Military Cemetery in Fleurbaix as an unknown Australian officer.

On 21 April 2026, the Australian Department of Defence announced that Martin's identity has been restored after over a century of his death. Martin's case was reviewed by the CWGC following the identification of five candidates for the remains. Extensive research by the Australian Unrecovered War Casualties – Army (UWC-A) using detailed notes from German archival records identified Charles Henry Martin as the unknown officer. A formal rededication ceremony for his new headstone was held on 24 April 2026.
