= Don Martin =

Don Martin may refer to:

- Don Martin (cartoonist) (1931–2000), cartoonist for Mad Magazine
- Don Martin (footballer) (1944–2009), English professional footballer for Northampton Town and Blackburn Rovers
- Don Martin (basketball) (1920–1997), American professional basketball player
- Don Martin (American football) (born 1949), professional American football player
- Don Martin (journalist) (born 1956), Canadian television and newspaper journalist
- Don Martin (field hockey) (born 1940), former Australian field hockey player
- Don Martin, Norwegian rapper, ex-member of Gatas Parlament

Donald Martin may refer to:

- Donald A. Martin (born 1940), set theorist and philosopher of mathematics at UCLA
- Donald Charles Martin (1849–1888), lawyer and political figure in Prince Edward Island
- Donald Paul Martin (1940–2019), founder of Martin Research Ltd.
- Donald Martin (screenwriter), Canadian screenwriter
- Donald Martin (bishop) (1873–1938), Scottish Roman Catholic clergyman

Dino Martin may refer to:

- Dino Martin (1920–1999), college basketball and college coach, given name is Don Martin

Don Martin using the Spanish honorific may refer to:

- Martim Afonso de Castro (1560–1607), nobleman and commander of the Portuguese Navy
- Martín Alfonso de León (1210–c. 1270/5), Spanish nobleman
- Martín Cortés de Albacar (1510–1582), Spanish cosmographer
- Martín Cortés (son of doña Marina) (1523–?)
- Martín Cortés, 2nd Marquis of the Valley of Oaxaca (1532–1589)
- Martín Casillas (1556–1618), Spanish architect

== See also ==
- Don Martineau (1952–2006), ice hockey player
- Don Martindale (born 1963), assistant coach for the Denver Broncos
- Donald Martino (1931–2005), Pulitzer Prize winning American composer
