= Judge Martin =

Judge Martin may refer to:

- Beverly B. Martin (born 1955), judge of the United States Court of Appeals for the Eleventh Circuit
- Boyce F. Martin Jr. (1935–2016), judge of the United States Court of Appeals for the Sixth Circuit
- George Ewing Martin (1857–1948), judge of the United States Court of Customs Appeals
- Isaac Jack Martin (1908–1966), judge of the United States Court of Customs and Patent Appeals
- James Loren Martin (1846–1915), judge of the United States District Court for the District of Vermont
- James Robert Martin Jr. (1909–1984), judge of the United States District Court for the District of South Carolina, and for the Eastern and Western Districts of South Carolina
- John Donelson Martin Sr. (1883–1962), judge of the United States Court of Appeals for the Sixth Circuit
- John S. Martin Jr. (born 1935), judge of the United States District Court for the Southern District of New York
- William Martin (judge), first Chief Justice of New Zealand

== See also ==
- J. Thomas Marten (born 1951), judge of the United States District Court for the District of Kansas
- Justice Martin (disambiguation)
