= Fred Martin (footballer, born 1907) =

English footballer (1907–1978)

Personal information
- Full name: Frederick Martin
- Date of birth: 28 December 1907
- Place of birth: Rotherhithe, England
- Date of death: 1978 (aged 70–71)
- Position: Wing-half

Senior career*
Years	Team	Apps	(Gls)
1925–1926	Rotherhithe		
1926–1931	Millwall	45	(1)
1932–1933	Torquay United	11	(0)
Total		56	(1)
- * Club domestic league appearances and goals

Frederick Martin (28 December 1907 – 1978) was an English footballer who played in the Football League for Millwall and Torquay United.
