= Alex Martin =

Alex Martin may refer to:

- Alex Martin (racing driver) (born 1987), British racing driver
- Alex Martin (cricketer) (born 1992), English former first-class cricketer
- Álex Martín (footballer) (born 1998), Spanish footballer
- Alex Martin (actress) (born 1973), American actress and film producer
