= Michael Martin =

Michael Martin may refer to:

== Entertainment ==
- Michael Martin (poker player), American professional poker player
- Michael Martin (Neighbours), fictional character on the Australian soap opera Neighbours
- T. Michael Martin (born 1984), American author and YouTube vlogger
- Michael Martin (1958–2009), given name of graffiti artist IZ the Wiz
- Michael Martin, singer in the country band Marshall Dyllon
- Michael Martin (born 1982), creator of the controversial YouTube channel FamilyOFive

== Politics ==
- Michael S. Martin (politician) (born 1938), Canadian politician
- Michael Martin, Baron Martin of Springburn (1945–2018), speaker of the House of Commons in the United Kingdom, 2000–2009
- Micheál Martin (born 1960), Irish politician, Taoiseach and former Tánaiste
- Mike Martin (British politician), a British Liberal Democrat MP

== Sports ==
- Michael Martin (cricketer) (1926–2011), English cricketer
- Michael Martin (Australian footballer) (born 1977), Australian rules footballer
- Michael Martin (footballer, born 1998), Caymanian footballer
- Micheál Martin (Gaelic footballer) (born 1994), Irish Gaelic footballer
- Mick Martin (born 1951), Irish soccer player
- Mick Martin (rugby union) (born 1956), Australian rugby union player

== Other ==
- Michael J. Martin (born 1950s), American physician, epidemiologist, and public health advocate
- Michael Lou Martin (1932–2015), American philosopher
- Michael G. F. Martin (born 1962), British professor of philosophy
- Michael Martin (engineer), British bridge engineer
- Michael E. Martin, United States Air Force general
- Michael S. Martin (general), United States Marine Corps general
- Michael T. Martin (born 1961), American bishop
- Michael C. Martin (born 1974), United States District Judge

== See also ==
- Michael Martyn (disambiguation)
- Mike Martin (disambiguation)
- Michael Craig-Martin (born 1941), Irish conceptual artist and painter
- Michael Sharvell-Martin (1944–2010), British actor
- Michel Martin, American journalist
- Harold Martin (RAF officer) (1918–1988), known as Micky, Australian bomber pilot
