= Philippe Martin =

Philippe Martin may refer to:

- Philippe-Armand Martin (1949-2023), French politician representing the Marne département
- Philippe Martin (politician) (born 1954), French politician representing the Gers and Landes départements
- Philippe Martin (racing driver) (born 1955), Belgian racing driver
- Philippe Martin (economist)(1966-2023), French economist
- Philippe Martin (producer), of films such as Comme elle respire
- Philippe Martin (actor) (?-), Quebec actor

== See also ==
- Philip Martin (disambiguation)
