= Blakey Martin =

English footballer

Personal information
- Full name: Blakey Martin
- Date of birth: 15 November 1891
- Place of birth: Rastrick, England
- Date of death: 21 October 1940 (aged 48)
- Place of death: Bradford, England
- Position: Centre half

Senior career*
Years	Team	Apps	(Gls)
1913–1914	Castleford Town		
1914–1915	Glossop	10	(1)
1918–1919	Castleford Town		
1919–1920	Derby County	6	(0)
1920–1922	Southend United	75	(1)
1922–1923	Llanelly		
- Hebden Bridge

International career
- Southern League XI
- Western League XI
- * Club domestic league appearances and goals

Blakey Martin MM and Bar (15 November 1891 – 21 October 1940) was an English professional footballer who played as a centre half in the Football League for Southend United, Glossop and Derby County. He played for the Southern League and Western League representative teams.

== Personal life ==
Martin served as a private in the 63rd (Royal Naval) Division during the First World War and saw action at Gallipoli and on the Western Front. He was awarded the Military Medal and Bar.

== Career statistics ==
Appearances and goals by club, season and competition
Club	Season	League			National Cup		Total	
Club	Season	Division	Apps	Goals	Apps	Goals	Apps	Goals
Glossop	1914–15	Second Division	10	1	0	0	10	1
Derby County	1919–20	First Division	6	0	0	0	6	0
Career total			16	1	0	0	16	1
