= Mary Martín =

Spanish-Mexican artist (1927–1982)

Mary Martín (January 1, 1927 – October 12, 1982) was a Spanish-Mexican artist whose work has been recognized with membership in the Salón de la Plástica Mexicana.

== Life ==
Martín was born María Luisa Martín in Salamanca, Spain to father Vicente Martín, who drew railways and railway lines. At the end of the Spanish Civil War, her family fled to Madrid, then north to France, but there they were caught and the father sent to a concentration camp by the Germans. The father escaped to help his family flee Europe and become refugees in Mexico. Later in this same country, she married architect Eduardo Vázquez Jiménez. She was a communist but not active in the party because of what she considered the machismo of the male members.

In this new country, Mary studied at the Academia Hispano Mexicana, but when she was a teenager she left school to pursue a career in art. Her father was her first teacher, and later studied with painter and architect Roberto Fernández Balbuena. From 1944 to 1949, she returned to school to study at the Escuela Nacional de Pintura, Escultura y Grabado "La Esmeralda", where she studied under teachers such as Alfredo Zalce, Carlos Orozco Romero, Agustín Lazo, Jesús Guerrero Galván, José Zúñiga and Manuel Rodríguez Lozano.

She died of cancer at age 55.

== Career ==
Martín's first exhibition came in 1949 at the Cristal Bookstore just off the Alameda Central in Mexico City, in which she demonstrated her works in painting and drawing. She then became a member of the Taller de Gráfica Popular focusing on printmaking with political and social themes such as images of workers, indigenous people, prisoners and works supporting the Cuban Revolution. In the early 1950s, she met Diego Rivera, who invited her to collaborate on mural projects at the Teatro de Insurgentes and The Olympic Stadium of the Ciudad Universitaria. From 1955 to 1960, she exhibited her work in Europe (Warsaw, Paris, Ljubljana, Stavropol, Moscow and Prague), Beijing and San Antonio, Texas. The student uprising in Mexico prompted her to become a drawing teacher, working with the architecture faculty of the National Autonomous University of Mexico from then until her death in 1982. She was inducted into the Salón de la Plástica Mexicana and served on its board.

== Artistry ==
Although she always kept her Spanish accent, her artwork was definitively Mexican. She was attracted to the Mexican Muralism movement. Diego Rivera described Martín as "an artist of great validity and seriousness...solid, honest, and full of emotion." One of her themes was the plight of women in Mexico, with the discovery of the stone disk of the goddess Coyolxauhqui inspiring for her a metaphor, and to whom she dedicated a series of works. Much of her work was drawing, favoring solid heavy black lines, along with ochre tones for dramatic effect.
