= Mike Martin =

Mike Martin may refer to:

== Sports ==
- Mike Martin (baseball coach) (1944–2024), former minor league baseball player and former head coach for the Florida State Seminoles
- Mike Martin Jr. (born 1973), son of the above and current head coach for the Florida State Seminoles
- Mike Martin (catcher) (born 1958), former baseball catcher for the Chicago Cubs
- Mike Martin (wide receiver) (born 1960), former wide receiver in NFL
- Mike Martin (basketball, born 1974), member of the BBL's Guildford Heat
- Mike Martin (basketball, born 1982), head coach of Brown University men's basketball team
- Mike Martin (defensive lineman) (born 1990), University of Michigan/Tennessee Titans American football player
- Mike Martin (Canadian football) (1940–?), Canadian football player
- Mick Martin (rugby union) (born 1956), Australian rugby union player

== Others ==
- Michael J. Martin, American physician, epidemiologist, and public health advocate
- Mike Martin (American guitarist) (born 1974), American guitarist, composer & producer
- Mike Martin (musician), member of All That Remains band
- Mike Martin (American politician) (born 1952), former member of the Texas House of Representatives
- Mike Martin (British politician), MP for Tunbridge Wells
- Mike Martin (character), a fictional SAS officer in Frederick Forsyth's books The Fist of God and The Afghan
- Martin Delray (born 1949), American singer, originally credited as Mike Martin

== See also ==
- Michael Martin (disambiguation)
