= Frank Martin =

Frank Martin may refer to:

== Sport ==
- Frank Martin (American football) (1919–1980), American football player
- Frank Martin (Australian footballer) (1895–1969), Australian rules footballer
- Frank Martin (baseball) (1878–1942), American baseball player
- Frank Martin (basketball) (born 1966), head men's basketball coach
- Frank Martin (boxer) (born 1995), American boxer
- Frank Martin (cricketer) (1893–1967), West Indian cricketer
- Frank Martin (equestrian) (1885–1962), Swedish horse rider
- Frank Martin (footballer, born 1887) (1887–1967), English footballer
- Frank Martin (ice hockey) (1933–2007), Canadian ice hockey player
- Francis Martin (runner) (1924–?), runner known as Frank Martin
- Frank Martin (sport administrator), from Australia
- Pancho Martin (Frank Martin, 1925–2012), U.S. Racing Hall of Fame horse trainer

== Arts ==
- Frank Martin (composer) (1890–1974), Swiss classical composer
- Frank Martin (ER character), fictional character on ER
- Frank Martin (sculptor) (1914–2004), British sculptor
- Frank Martin (Transporter), fictional protagonist in the Transporter series

== Politics ==
- Frank Martin (councillor), Democratic Alliance councillor in Cape Town, South Africa
- Frank Martin (mayor) (1938–2012), mayor of Columbus, Georgia

== See also ==
- A. Frank Martin (1894–1982), American founder of Kappa Kappa Psi fraternity
- Francis Martin (disambiguation)
- Frankie Martin (1908–1988), Canadian boxer
- Franklin Martin, American film director, producer, screenwriter
- Franklin Martins (born 1948), Brazilian journalist
