= Brad Martin =

Brad Martin may refer to:

- Brad Martin (singer-songwriter) (1973–2022), American country music singer-songwriter
- Brad Martin (snowboarder) (born 1986), Canadian snowboarder
- Brad Martin (rugby league), English rugby league footballer
- R. Brad Martin (born 1951), American businessman and politician from Tennessee
- Brad Martin, character in Flight 7500
