= Bobby Martin =

Bobby Martin may refer to:

- Bobby Martin (American football) (1987–2020), American football player
- Bobby Martin (musician) (1903–2001), jazz trumpeter
- Bobby Martin, bass player for Canadian country group the James Barker Band
- Bobby Martin (producer) (1930–2013), American music producer, arranger and songwriter
- Bobby Martin, television series character, see list of All My Children characters

== See also ==
- Bobbi Martin (1943–2000), singer
- Robert Martin (disambiguation)
- Bob Martin (disambiguation)
