= Fernando Martín =

Fernando Martín may refer to:

- Fernando Martín (businessman) (born 1947), Spanish businessman, former chairman of Martinsa-Fadesa and president of Real Madrid C.F.
- Fernando Martín (footballer) (1981–2025), Spanish football player
- Fernando Martín (basketball) (1962–1989), Spanish basketball player
- Fernando Martín García, Puerto Rican pro-independence politician

== See also ==
- Fernando Martínez (disambiguation)
