= Erwin Marx Award =

Technical award

The Erwin Marx Award is an award made every two years, in odd numbered years, jointly by the Institute of Electrical and Electronics Engineers and the Nuclear and Plasma Sciences Society at the IEEE International Pulsed Power Conference. It is awarded to an individual for their contribution over at least ten years in the field of pulsed power technology.

The recipient receives US$2,000 and a plaque, and delivers the Erwin Marx Lecture at conference.

Named after a German electrical engineer, it was awarded for the first time in 1981 at the 3rd IEEE International Pulsed Power Conference.
