= Wayne Martin (footballer) =

English footballer

Personal information
- Full name: Wayne L. Martin
- Date of birth: 16 December 1965 (age 60)
- Place of birth: Basildon, England
- Position: Defender

Youth career
- ?–1982: Crystal Palace

Senior career*
Years	Team	Apps	(Gls)
1982–1984	Crystal Palace	1	(0)
1984–?	Arcadia Shepherds		
- * Club domestic league appearances and goals

Wayne L. Martin (born 16 December 1965) is an English former professional footballer who played in the Football League for Crystal Palace as a defender.

Martin was born in Basildon, UK and began his youth career with Crystal Palace signing professional terms in July 1982. His sole appearance for the club was on 11 December 1983, in a home 1–2 defeat to Carlisle United. At the end of the season Martin moved on to South African club Arcadia Shepherds.
