= Matt Martin =

Matt Martin may refer to:

- Matt Martin (racing driver) (born 1991), American racing driver
- Matt Martin (ice hockey, born 1971), American ice hockey player who played for the Toronto Maple Leafs
- Matt Martin (British politician) (born 1971), British politician
- Matt Martin (ice hockey, born 1989), Canadian ice hockey winger who played for the New York Islanders
- Matt Martin (baseball) (born 1969), American baseball coach
- Matt Martin (American football) (born 1979), American football player
- Matthew Martin (lawyer) (born 1979), United States Attorney for the United States District Court for the Middle District of North Carolina
- Matthew Martin (mariner) (1676-1749) an East India Company mariner and politician
- Matthew Martin (merchant) (1748–1838), English merchant, naturalist and philanthropist
- Matthew Martin (organist) (born 1976), English organist and composer
- Matt Martin (Chicago politician) (born 1984), Illinois politician
- Matt Martians (born 1988), stage name of Matthew Martin, American record producer, illustrator, singer, and songwriter
