= Daniel Martin =

Daniel, Dani, or Dan Martin may refer to:

== Arts and entertainment ==
- Daniel Martín (Musician) (1990), English Musician
- Daniel Martín (actor) (1935–2009), Spanish actor
- Daniel Martin (actor) (1951/1952 – 2024), French actor
- Dan Martin (actor) (born 1951), American actor
- Dan Martin (drama educator) (born 1953), American art educator
- Dani Martín (singer) (born 1977), Spanish musician and actor
- Dan Martin (cartoonist), American cartoonist

== Sports ==
=== Association football (soccer) ===
- Dani (footballer, born 1981) (Daniel Martín Alexandre), Spanish footballer
- Dan Martin (footballer, born 1986), English-Welsh footballer
- Dani Martín (footballer, born 1997), Spanish footballer
- Dani Martín (footballer, born 1998), Spanish footballer
- Dan Martin (footballer, born 2002), English footballer
- Dani Martín (footballer, born 2005), Spanish footballer

=== Other sports ===
- Daniel S. Martin (fl. 1902–1906), American college football coach
- Dan Martin (cyclist) (born 1986), Irish road bicycle racer
- Daniel Martin (swimmer) (born 2000), Romanian swimmer
- Dani Martín (field hockey), Spanish field hockey coach
- Dan Martin (tennis), Canadian tennis player

== Others ==
- Daniel Martin (politician) (c. 1780–1831), American politician, governor of the state of Maryland
- Danny Martin (politician), (born 1949), American politician in Maine
- Daniel P. Martin, United States Navy admiral

== Other uses ==
- Daniel Martin (novel), 1977 novel by John Fowles

== See also ==
- Daniel Marthin (born 2001), Indonesian badminton player
