= Fredrik Robert Martin =

Swedish orientalist and art collector (1868–1933)

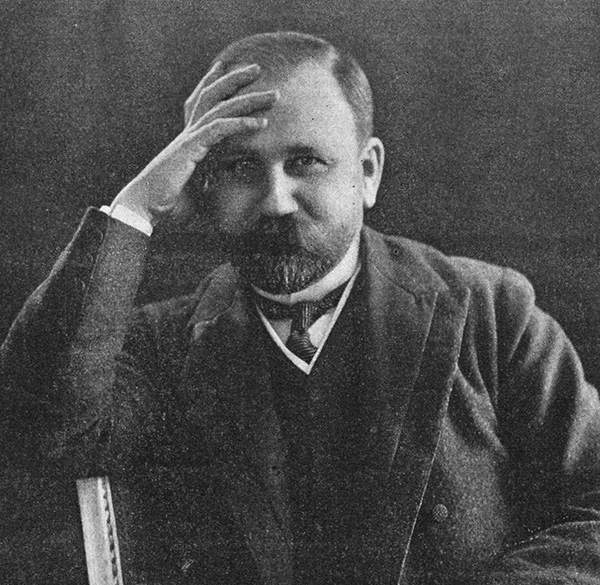
Frederick Martin in 1908

Fredrik Robert Martin (1868–1933) was a Swedish diplomat, scholar, collector, art historian, and author. He worked in one of the diplomatic missions of Sweden in Constantinople as a dragoman.

Martin was a collector, and wrote about his career in books.

== Works ==
- — (1897). Moderne Keramik von Centralasien: Sammlung F. R. Martin [Modern Ceramics of Central Asia: Collection F. R. Martin] (in German). Stockholm: Chelius.
- — (1897). Morgenländische Stoffe (in German).
- — (1900). Dänische Silberschätze aus der Zeit Christians IV aufbewahrt in der Kaiserlichen Schatzkammer zu Moskau (in German).
- — (1901). Die persischen Prachtstoffe im Schlosse Rosenborg in Kopenhagen (in German). Stockholm; Leipzig: Chelius; Hiersemann.
- — (1906–1908). A history of oriental carpets before 1800. Vienna.
- — (1912). The miniature painting and painters of Persia, India and Turkey from the 8th to the 18th century. London: Bernard Quaritch. vol. 1: online, vol. 2: online.
- — (1933). Sett, hört och känt : skisser från Turkiet, Ryssland, Italien och andra land.
