= Keith Martin =

Keith Martin may refer to:

- Keith Martin (politician) (born 1960), Canadian executive director of the Consortium of Universities for Global Health, former politician
- Keith Martin (ophthalmologist) (born 20th-century), medical researcher specialising in the treatment of glaucoma
- Keith Martin (broadcaster) (1934–2024), British broadcaster and pirate radio DJ
- Keith Martin (musician) (1966–2022), American R&B singer-songwriter and multi-instrumentalist
- Keith Martin (artist) (1911-1983), American abstract and surrealist artist
- Keith Martin, a character in Time Crisis II
- Carl Sargent or Keith Martin (1952–2018), British parapsychologist and author of several roleplaying game-based products and novels
- Keith Martin, founder and editor of Sports Car Market

== See also ==
- Keith Martyn (fl. 1990s–2000s), Australian weather presenter
