= Glenn Martin =

Glenn Martin may refer to:

- Glenn Martin (coach) (1906–1997), American football, basketball, and baseball coach
- Glenn E. Martin (born 1970), American criminal justice reform advocate
- Glenn L. Martin (1886–1955), American aviation pioneer
- Glenn Martin (judge) (born 1955), justice of the Supreme Court of Queensland
- Glenn N. Martin, New Zealand aviation pioneer, inventor of the Martin Jetpack
- Glenn Martin, DDS, an American stop-motion-animated television series

== See also ==
- Glen Martin (disambiguation)
