= Robert Martin (academic administrator) =

Native American academic administrator

Robert Martin EdD
- Citizenship: Cherokee Nation and American
- Occupation: college president
- Years active: 2007–2025
- Spouse: Luci Tapahonso

Academic background
- Education: University of Kansas (2004)
- Website: iaia.edu

Robert G. Martin, EdD, is the president of the Institute of American Indian Arts in Santa Fe, New Mexico, and a citizen of the Cherokee Nation.

== Career ==
Robert Martin is a Native American academic administrator. He served as president of Southwestern Indian Polytechnic Institute from 1989 to 1999. He later became president of Haskell Indian Junior College where he worked for ten years. From 2001 to 2005, Martin was president of Tohono Oʼodham Community College. He was associate head of the American Indian Studies Programs at University of Arizona. In May 2007, he was appointed president of IAIA.
