= Andreas Martin =

Andreas Martin may refer to:

- Andreas Martin (lutenist) (born 1963), German lutenist
- Andreas Martin (painter) (1699–1763), Flemish painter and draughtsman
- Andreas Martin (singer) (1952–2025), German schlager singer
