= Pierre Martin (engineer) =

Pierre Martin (12 May 1932 – 21 December 1986) was a French engineer and spelunker who enormously contributed to mapping and researching of a multitude of caves in the states of São Paulo, Goias and Bahia, in Brazil. He was one of the founders and president of the Brazilian Speleology Society (SBE). He died in a car accident on 21 December 1986.

== Biography ==
Born in France on May 12, 1932 Pierre made all its primary school in Lyon. Since the age of 12 he visited the caves, being the Grotte de Jujurieux his first underground emotion. In 1950, already living in Brazil, he began mapping the Santana cave in the Ribeira valley, a project he was able to complete only 14 years later. Working in Londrina, Paraná, he founded a speleology club, outfitted it with everything necessary, trained the staff and came to attend the Ribeira valley, the Santana cave, his favorite, and neighboring caves. In July 1964 he took part in the first Brazilian speleological congress organized in the forests of Betari. Later, working for Mineradora Furnas, he began a systematic survey of caves throughout the region.

In 1970 he was elected president of the SBE and, he outlined the structure of the society, formed binders, created registers, scientific and technical committees, etc. He also learned to establish and maintain excellent relationships with government agencies, universities and later with the International Union of Speleology. His performance was consecrated by the attainment of an award Marechal Rondon, medal given by the Brazilian Geographical Society to all those outstanding personalities in the field of science.

From 1971, he definitely guides researchers for caves located in unexplored regions of Brazil. And it is with this effort that expeditions were carried out in the states of Bahia and Goias, in the Angelica – Bezerra system and several other groups Terra Ronca, São Vicente, São Mateus, which soon became the more extensive cavities known in the country.

== See also ==
- Guy Christian Collet
- Peter Wilhelm Lund
- Sigismund Ernst Richard Krone
- Peter Clausen (naturalist)
