= William Hoare (cricketer, born 1868) =

Australian cricketer

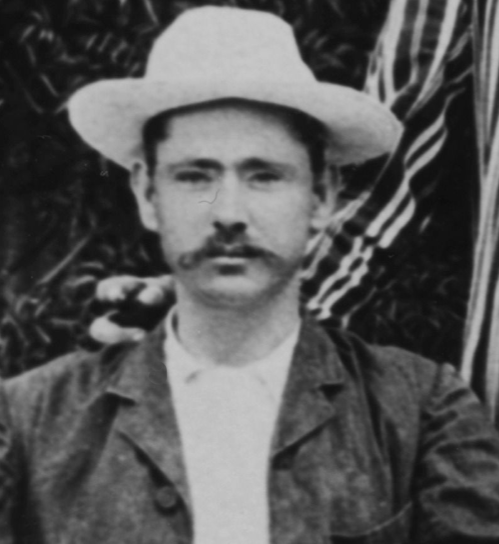

Personal information
- Full name: William Hoare Lawrence
- Born: 23 October 1868; Brisbane, Queensland, Australia
- Died: 16 December 1954 (aged 86); Salt Lake City, Utah, United States
- Source: Cricinfo, 14 June 2020

William Hoare (23 October 1868 – 16 December 1954) was an Australian cricketer. He played fourteen first-class matches for Queensland from 1892–93 to 1902–03.

== Cricket career ==
As of 1883 Hoare was playing for Unions cricket club in Brisbane. In 1884 he moved to Gregorys club, and in 1886 he played for Windsor club. In 1887 he played for a combined team representing the clubs competing in Brisbane Junior Cricket against a combined Dinmore and Goodna side. In 1888 he played for Nelson cricket club.

By early 1890 he was playing for Pembroke cricket club in the Southern Queensland Cricket Union competition, but he moved to the South Brisbane Cricket Club later in the year. By 1893 he was playing for Graziers' Cricket Club. In March 1893 he was selected for a practice match between two Queensland sides played to decide who would represent the state in its inaugural first-class match against New South Wales and took 7 for 19, a performance which earned him selection in the first-class game in March.

When Brisbane electoral cricket was established in 1897 Hoare played for the Woolloongabba club in the new competition.

== See also ==
- List of Queensland first-class cricketers
