= Charlie Martin (physicist) =

British physicist (1926–1999)

John Christopher Martin
- Born: 21 September 1926; London, UK
- Died: 22 March 1999 (aged 72); London, UK
- Education: King's College London
- Known for: Pulsed power
- Awards: 1977–Defence Nuclear Agency Gold Medal; 1981–Erwin Marx Award; 1989–CBE
- Scientific career
- Fields: Physics
- Workplaces: Atomic Weapons Research Establishment

John Christopher "Charlie" Martin CBE (21 September 1926 – 22 March 1999) was a UK-born physicist, known colloquially as "the father of Pulsed Power".

He was educated at King's College, London.

He was instrumental in the development of a US Nuclear Weapons Effects programme in the 1970s and received thanks in the history of the Defence Nuclear Agency. He was later awarded the Defence Nuclear Agency Gold Medal in 1977, one of only a few non-US citizens to receive it.

He was awarded the first ever Erwin Marx Award in 1981 at the third IEEE International Pulsed Power Conference in Albuquerque, New Mexico.
