= Tantamount Theater =

Theatre in Carmel Valley, California

- Puppet theater Barn theater
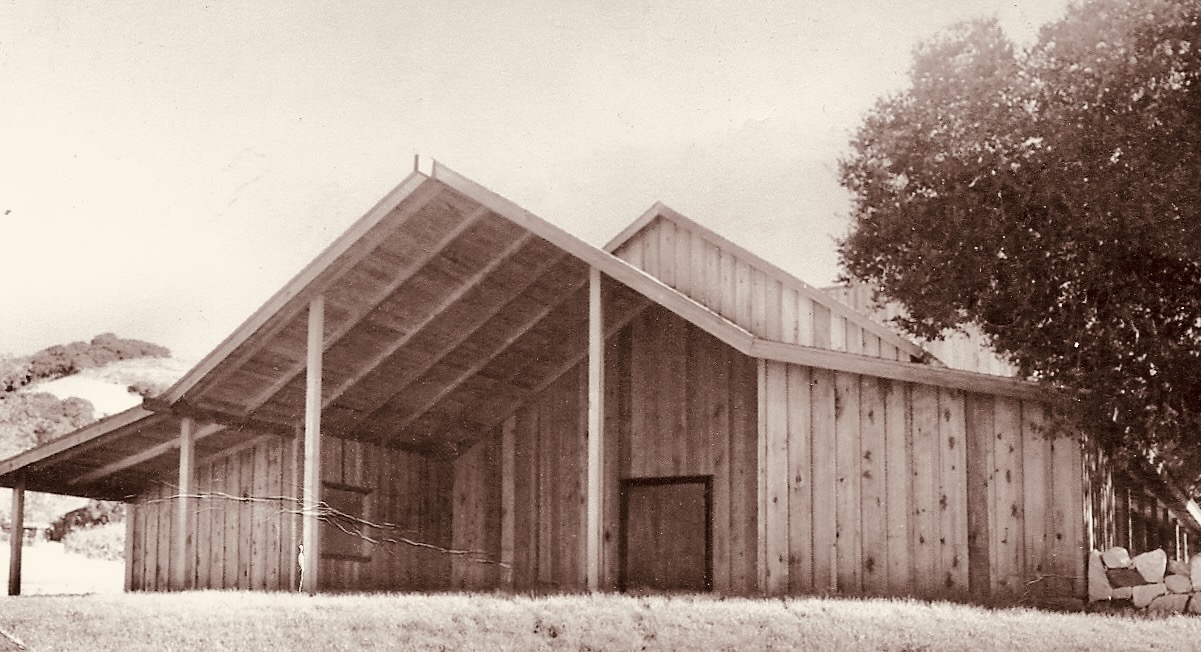
- The Tantamount Theater
- Interactive map of Tantamount Theater
- Location: Middle Canyon Road, Carmel Valley, California, US
- Coordinates: 36°29′51″N 121°44′29″W
- Owner: François Martin
- Capacity: 144-seat
- Type: Puppet theatre

Construction
- Opened: 24 June 1960; 66 years ago
- Closed: 5 October 1978; 47 years ago

Tantamount Theater was a puppet theatre for children and their families located in Carmel Valley, California. François Joseph Martin built and owned the theater. Within Carmel Valley, the theater stood as the only establishment where puppet performances became a regular occurrence.

== History ==
=== Barn Theater ===
Jeanne D'Orge encouraged Martin and Ralph Geddis to move to Carmel Valley and build a theater which she helped them to build.

In 1956, Martin and Geddis purchased the stable and horse barn owned Frank De Amaral, situated upon the former grounds of the Muriel Vanderbilt Estate ranch on Middle Canyon Road, Carmel Valley (above Los Laureles Lodge). The barn that was previously used as a meeting space by Carmel Valley Fire Department volunteers was converted into the Barn Theater.

=== Tantamount Theater ===
After three years of construction, Tantamount Theater opened in June 1960 with a 144-seat theater. It was described as "the most handsome auditorium I have seen on the West Coast" by the critic Stanley Eichelbaum.

Early productions included Alice in Wonderland, Uncle Tom's Cabin, and A Midsummer Night's Dream, as well as original productions written by Martin.

The theater also showed classic films, although it was best known for its puppet shows.

=== Tantamount Theater fire ===
On October 5, 1978, the Tantamount was destroyed in a fire. During the fire, almost all 800 puppets crafted by partners throughout the years were also lost.
