= Louis Martin =

Louis Martin may refer to:

- Lou Martin (Louis Michael Martin, 1949–2012), Northern Irish blues and rock pianist
- Louis Honore Martin (1895–1920), French World War I flying ace
- Louis Martin (lay brother) (1823–1894), French layman and father of a Catholic saint
- Louis Martin (settler) (1820–1864), pioneer settler in Gillespie and Mason Counties, Texas
- Louis Martin (swimmer) (fl. 1900), swimmer at the 1900 Summer Olympics and water polo player
- Louis Martin (Swiss politician) (1838–1912), president of the Swiss National Council (1903/1904)
- Louis Martin (weightlifter) (1936–2015), British Olympic weightlifter
- Louis Martin (financier) (1866–1957), French financier and civil servant
- Louis E. Martin (1912–1997), American journalist
- Louis M. Martin (1863–1940), New York politician and judge
- Louis St. Martin (1820–1893), Louisiana politician

== See also ==
- Lewis Martin (disambiguation)
