= François Martin (composer) =

French composer and cellist

François Martin (French pronunciation: [fʁɑ̃swa maʁtɛ̃]; 1727–1757) was a French composer and cellist. He is said to have died at the age of thirty while in the service of Louis de Gramont, 6th Duke of Gramont. His works include petits motets. His works also include "Six Trios ou Conversations à Trois Pour Deux Violons ou Fluttes, et un Violonchelle. Dediés, à Monseigneur le Duc de Gramont. Gravés par Mme. Leclair. IIIe Oeuvre."

He is to be distinguished from another earlier composer of airs de cour called François Martin who served as ordinaire to Gaston, Duke of Orléans in 1658, and published a book of guitar works in 1663. See "François I Martin (compositeur)" on French Wikipedia.
