= Philip Martin =

Philip Martin or Phillip Martin may refer to:

- Phillip Martin (1926–2010), Native American political leader
- Phillip Martin (artist) (1927–2014) painter working with collage and sculpture
- Philip Martin (director) (active from 2000), British television and film director
- Philip Martin (Neighbours), a fictional character on the Australian soap opera Neighbours
- Philip Martin (pianist) (born 1947), Irish composer and pianist
- Philip Martin (poet) (1931–2005), Australian poet
- Philip Martin (screenwriter) (1938–2020), English screenwriter on the science fiction show Doctor Who
- Phillip Martin III (born 1968), American rapper and producer
- Phil Martin (boxer) (1950–1994), English boxer
- Phil Martin (basketball) (1928–2008), guard in the National Basketball Association
- Phil Martin (highland games) (born 1964), former professional strongman and highland games competitor
- Philip Wykeham Martin (1829–1878), British Member of Parliament for Rochester, 1856–1878
- Phillip W. Martin (born 1948), Kansas state legislator

== See also ==
- Philippe Martin (disambiguation)
