= Allan W. Martin =

American politician

Allan W. Martin (October 5, 1874 – August 31, 1942) was a Vermont businessman and elected official. A native of Wisconsin, he served as a Republican member of the Vermont House of Representatives for two terms and the Vermont Senate for one.

== Biography ==
Martin was born on October 5, 1874, in Beaver Dam, Wisconsin, the son of William D. and Myra (McCoy) Martin. He was raised in Wilmette, Illinois, and attended the public schools of Wilmette.

== Career ==
Martin moved to Hartland, Vermont, in 1904, and was a manufacturer of woodwork, including doors, sashes, blinds, boxes, shingles, and shipping crates. A Republican, he served in town offices including auditor and school board member. He was a member of the Vermont House of Representatives from 1923 to 1927. He was a member of the Vermont Senate from 1927 to 1929.

== Death and burial ==
Martin died in Windsor on August 31, 1942, and was buried at Hartland Village Cemetery.

== Family ==
Martin was married to Ella (Carpenter) Martin. Their children included Alonzo, Azra, Ella Josephine, and William David.

== Sources ==
=== Internet ===
- "Vermont Death Records 1909-2008, Entry for Allan W. Martin". Ancestry.com. Provo, UT: Ancestry.com LLC. August 31, 1942.
- "U.S. Census for 1910, Entry for Allan W. Martin, Hartland, Vermont". Ancestry.com. Provo, UT: Ancestry.com LLC. 1910.
- "U.S. Census for 1930, Entry for Allan W. Martin, Hartland, Vermont". Ancestry.com. Provo, UT: Ancestry.com LLC. 1930.

=== Newspapers ===
- "Representatives from the County". St. Albans Daily Messenger. November 8, 1922. pp. 1, 3 – via Newspapers.com.
- "Representatives Elected". The Burlington Free Press. November 6, 1924. p. 9 – via Newspapers.com.
- "Allan W. Martin". The Tampa Daily Times. September 2, 1942. p. 2 – via Newspapers.com.

=== Books ===
- Vermont General Assembly (1924). Vermont Legislative Directory (1924). Montpelier, VT: Aaron H. Grout, Vermont Secretary of State.
- Vermont General Assembly (1927). Vermont Legislative Directory (1927). Montpelier, VT: Aaron H. Grout, Vermont Secretary of State.
