= Charlie Martin (Australian footballer) =

Australian rules footballer

Personal information
- Full name: Charles Thomas Martin
- Born: 2 November 1883; Richmond, Victoria
- Died: 21 October 1955 (aged 71); Caulfield South, Victoria

Playing career^{1}
Years	Club	Games (Goals)
1903	Fitzroy	2 (0)
- ^{1} Playing statistics correct to the end of 1903.

Charles Thomas Martin (2 November 1883 – 21 October 1955) was an Australian rules footballer who played for Fitzroy in the Victorian Football League (VFL).

Martin debuted in Fitzroy's round 1 match of the 1903 season against Essendon, and played again the following week against Melbourne. Those two matches were the extent of his VFL career.
