= Wheeler Martin =

American judge (1765–1836)

Wheeler Martin (August 16, 1765 – May 22, 1836) was a justice of the Rhode Island Supreme Court from June 1823 to May 1824, appointed from Providence, Rhode Island.

Born in Rehoboth, Massachusetts, Martin was first elected to the court of common pleas and general sessions of the peace for Providence in 1791, and thereafter re-elected several times. In 1803 he also became a public notary, and in 1804 he reported to President Thomas Jefferson Rhode Island's passage of the Twelfth Amendment to the United States Constitution. After serving as a justice of the state supreme court from June 1823 to May 1824, he was an elector in the 1824 United States presidential election, and was himself a candidate for the office governor of Rhode Island that same year, albeit unsuccessfully.

In addition to his service on the court, Martin is known for his role as the defendant in the case of Stoddard v. Martin, the first case recorded in the official reports of the Rhode Island Supreme Court. The case originated with a $50 wager that plaintiff Martin Stoddard made with Martin on October 26, 1826, that Ashur Robbins would be elected to the United States Senate. Plaintiff and defendant drew their respective checks for the amount of fifty dollars each check, and delivered both of said checks to a stakeholder, to be delivered to the party that won the bet. Stoddard won the bet and received the check from Martin. On March 5, 1827 Stoddard requested the cashier of Eagle Bank in Providence to pay him the $50 from the check, who refused to pay. Stoddard sued, and a jury awarded him the amount of the bet plus interest and costs. On appeal, the state supreme court reversed the decision, stating that the bet was void on principles of public policy. The court further found that the bet could have produced corruption and debased the character of those involved.

In February 1831, Martin published in the Vermont Intelligencer his recollections from New England's Dark Day, which had occurred over fifty years earlier on May 19, 1780. In October 1831, Martin condemned the Snow Town riot in Providence, in which African American homes were targeted by a white mob; Martin praised the sheriff for having the police efficiently respond to the riots.

Martin died in Seekonk, Massachusetts, at the age of 70.
