= Vincent A. Martin =

American politician

Vincent Albert Martin (February 17, 1870 – September 22, 1951) from Fruitport, Michigan, was a member of the Michigan Senate.

== Biography ==
Martin was born on February 17, 1870, in Dane County, Wisconsin. He was Congregationalist.

== Career ==
Martin was a member of the Senate from 1917 to 1918 and again from 1925 to 1928. He was unsuccessful candidate in the Republican primary for the Senate in 1922 and 1940.

Martin died at his home in Grand Haven, Michigan, at the age of 81.
