= Cormac McCarthy (musician) =

American musician

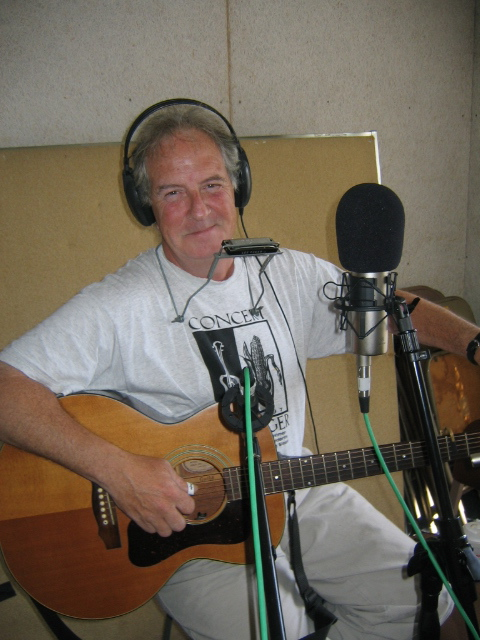
Cormac McCarthy

Cormac McCarthy (born c. 1952) is an American folk singer-songwriter. He was born in Ohio but moved to rural New Hampshire at age ten. He was inspired to play music when his sister, visiting home from college, brought records by Joan Baez, Bob Dylan, and Eric Andersen, and he traded his clarinet for a guitar. He was college roommates with Bill Morrissey, who encouraged him to perform his music in public, and co-wrote the songs "Marigold Hall" and "Married Man" with Morrissey. He lives in southern Maine.

== Discography ==
- Cormac McCarthy
- Troubled Sleep
- Picture Gallery Blues
- Curious Thing
- Collateral (2013) which features two songs addressed to Morrissey: "Doppelganger" and "The Crossroad"
