= Jane Martin (public servant) =

British public servant

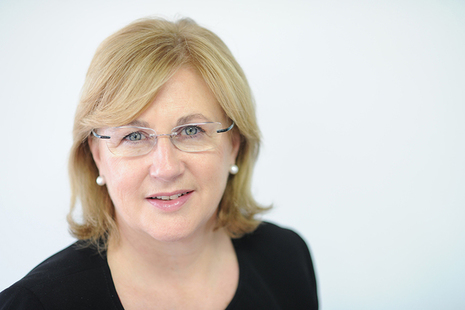
Martin in 2013

Jane Elizabeth Martin CBE is a British public servant, who has served as Local Government Ombudsman and as a member of the Committee on Standards in Public Life.

== Education ==
Martin has a Ph.D. in educational administration and has studied public leadership at Warwick Business School.

== Career ==
Martin's career has included research on school administration at the University of Birmingham, School of Education, a post as a local education officer, work with the Improvement and Development Agency for local government, appointment as the first executive director of the Centre for Public Scrutiny in 2003, and in 2007 the role of deputy chief executive of the Local Better Regulation Office.

She served as a Local Government Ombudsman (one of two post-holders) for a seven-year term from 2010 and was appointed to a five-year term, from 1 January 2017, as an independent member of the Committee on Standards in Public Life.

As of November 2021 she is a lay member of the board of the Legal Ombudsman.

== Recognition ==
Martin was appointed CBE in the 2017 New Year Honours "For services to administrative justice and transparency in local government."
