= Alexander Martin (disambiguation) =

Alexander Martin (1740–1807) was the Federalist governor of the state of North Carolina, now one of the US.

Alexander Martin may also refer to:

- Alexander Martin (Canadian politician) (1842–1921)
- Alexander Martin (British sport shooter) (1895–1962), British Olympic sport shooter
- Alexander Martin (academic), American Methodist minister and university president
- Alexander Martin (Canadian sport shooter) (1864–1951), Canadian Olympic sport shooter
- Alexander E. Martin (1867–?), American politician
- Alexander Munro Martin (1852–1915), Canadian politician
- Alexander Martin (Scottish minister) (1856–193?), Scottish Presbyterian minister
- Sandy Martin (politician) (born 1957), British politician
