= Ernie Martin =

Australian rules footballer (1903–1996)

Personal information
- Full name: Ernest John Martin
- Born: 3 June 1903; Sydney, New South Wales
- Died: 7 September 1996 (aged 93)
- Original team: Carlton District
- Height: 168 cm (5 ft 6 in)
- Weight: 61 kg (134 lb)
- Position: Wingman

Playing career^{1}
Years	Club	Games (Goals)
1923–25	Carlton	4 (0)
1926–27	Coburg (VFA)	30 (7)
1928–29	Essendon	17 (0)
1930–32	Coburg (VFA)	41 (1)
Total		92 (8)
- ^{1} Playing statistics correct to the end of 1929.

Ernest John 'Snowy' Martin (3 June 1903 – 7 September 1996) was an Australian rules footballer who played for Carlton and Essendon in the Victorian Football League (VFL) during the 1920s.

Recruited from Carlton District, Martin was a wingman and could only manage to play four games in three years at Carlton. He spent the 1926 and 1927 seasons with Coburg in the VFA and participated in back to back premierships. His performances in 1927 made him the first Coburg player to win a Recorder Cup.

Martin had another VFL stint in 1928, this time at Essendon, but struggled with a knee injury in his two seasons and eventually returned to Coburg.
