= Pat Martin (baseball) =

American baseball player (1894-1949)

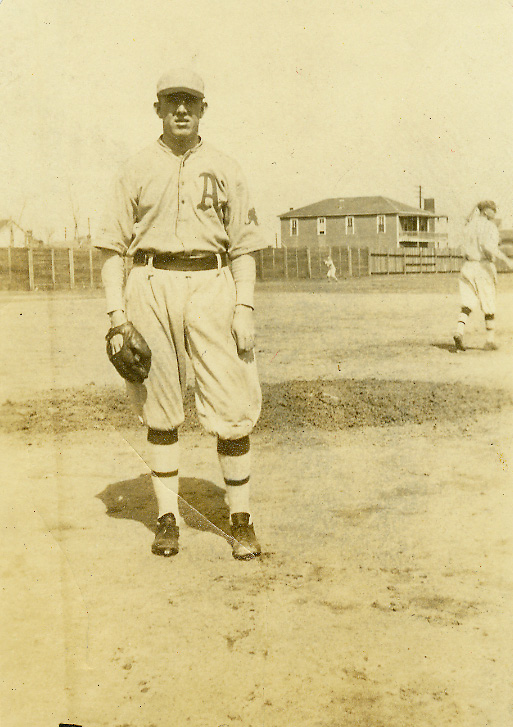
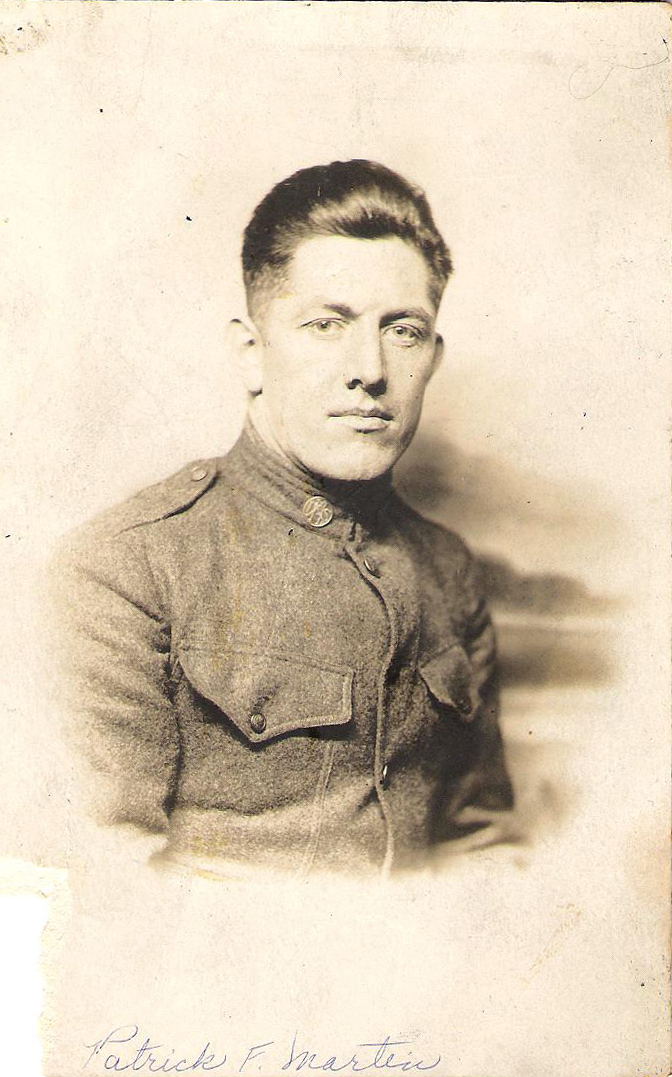
Pat (Paddy) Martin Pat Martin Philadelphia A's 1919-1920. Patrick Martin WWI received the Purple Heart.
- Pitcher
- Born: April 13, 1894; Brooklyn, New York, U.S.
- Died: February 4, 1949 (aged 54); Brooklyn, New York, U.S.
- Batted: Left Threw: Left

MLB debut
- September 20, 1919, for the Philadelphia Athletics

Last MLB appearance
- June 6, 1920, for the Philadelphia Athletics

MLB statistics
- Win–loss record: 1–6
- Earned run average: 5.61
- Strikeouts: 20
- Stats at Baseball Reference

Teams
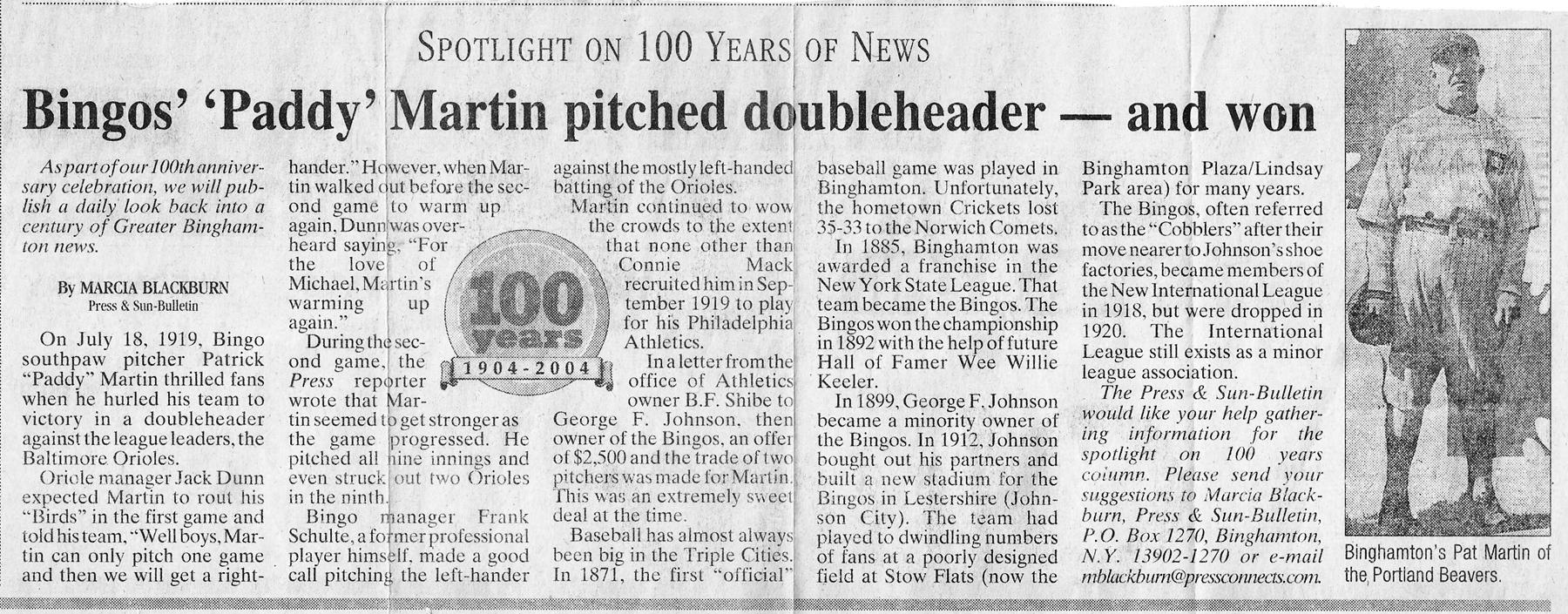
- Philadelphia Athletics (1919–1920); July 18, 1919 Bingo's Paddy Martin pitcher news article

Patrick Francis Martin (April 13, 1894 – February 4, 1949) was an American Major League Baseball pitcher from 1919 to 1920. He played for the Philadelphia Athletics. Martin started seven major league games and went 1–6.

Martin also pitched in the minor leagues from 1913 to 1927, compiling a career minor league record of 163–125. His greatest season was 1916, with the Eastern League's New London Planters. He pitched a career-high 248 innings, won a career-high 21 games, and led the league in winning percentage. The Planters won the pennant.

== Biography by Grandson David R Martin ==
Patrick Martin was born April 13, 1894, at 12:15 pm in Brooklyn, New York. He was the fifth child of Michael Martin (age 35) and Ellen Mary Farrell (age 25), following his siblings Edward, Rose, James, and Helen, and before John. The family lived at 272 Smith Street in the 10th ward of Brooklyn, where Michael supported his family as a checker.

Martin was inducted into the Army on September 20, 1917, at age 23 in Brooklyn, and served in World War I as a corporal. He fought in the 1918 Battle of Château-Thierry France from April 6, 1918, to March 11, 1919, with the 306th Infantry Company C. While there, he received a machine gun wound to his leg October 1, 1918. The crucifix in his pocket helped to deflect the bullet, and he was awarded the Purple Heart. Martin received an honorary discharge on March 28, 1919, and was also given a Victory medal and 2 Battle Clasps. Martin was reported to be single, 5'11" tall, with blue eyes and brown hair.

Patrick Martin made his living as a professional baseball player. His career began in the International League with the Binghamton Cobblers, which was owned by George F. Johnson, with manager Frank Schulte. Their team was affectionately called the "Bingos" and later the Binghamton Triplets. An article in the Binghamton, New York, newspaper, dated July 18, 1918: "Ironman Pat Martin pitches at Johnson Field against Jack Dunn's Baltimore Orioles." Binghamton won both games of the double header 10-3 and 8–5. While they were in town, another double header was scheduled and again Binghamton swept Baltimore 10-3 and 6–2. At the time the news reported that "Jack Dunn owns the international league and all the parks, putting pressure on the umpires."

Martin also pitched for Columbus in the American Association under manager Clarence Rowland. There are also reports of Martin pitching for the Springfield Planters on Plant Field and losing to New London 0–4, and having a sacrifice hit. A double header was then played against New London with Springfield taking both games 4-0 and 5–2.

On September 11, 1919, it was reported, by Ira Thomas of the American Baseball Club of Philadelphia, that a deal of $2500 plus two pitchers was reached in return for Martin going to the Philadelphia Athletics. Connie Mack was the manager.

On January 6, 1921, Martin married Geraldine Lucreta Whalon of Binghamton, New York. They had one son, Raymond Francis Martin, on October 4, 1921.

On May 13, 1924, it was reported in the Binghamton paper that "Geraldine Whalon Martin, wife of Patrick F Martin died at 10:45 am Thursday at 11 Martha Street. Raymond and Patrick were at her side when she died, as Patrick had come home from Rochester to be with her." Geraldine was only 25 years old, leaving Patrick and 2½-year-old Raymond.

In the baseball season of 1924 it was reported at 6 feet tall, Martin had a "sparkling fast ball and bewildering curve." During this season Martin pitched 29 games while playing for the Reading "Keystones" in the International League. Managed by Spencer Abbott (baseball), Martin recorded 11 wins and 14 losses. With this record he was second to the top pitching record for the season with 2.97 earned runs per nine inning game (ERA). In first place that year was Walter Beall of Rochester who had 2.76 ERA. Beall was called up to the Yankees at the end of the season. Martin was sold to the Pacific Coast League.

In the Binghamton Press on Sunday January 18, 1925, the records for pitching for the 1924 season were reported. It showed that Walter Beall of Rochester had 95 runs and went to the Yankees for the 1925 season. Patrick Martin pitched a total of 215 innings that year. In 29 games he won 11 and lost 14, completing 22 games, including 3 shutouts. He earned 71 runs and was sold to the Portland Beavers. Lefty Grove pitched 47 games and 19 completed. He earned 79 runs and went to the Philadelphia Athletics. Walt Smallwood pitched 42 games, completing 22. He finished 13 games for others. His record was 11 wins and 18 losses. He went on to play for the Reading Keys. Other pitchers mentioned were Al Mamaux, who was turned back to the minors at Minneapolis, and Earl Moore, who went on to the majors.

In the Toronto paper, Toronto Telegram (The Pink Tely), Vol. XLVI, it was reported that an exhibition game at Island Stadium on May 6 took place with Reading taking on the Toronto Leafs, and Martin pitching for Toronto. In this game he gave up only 4 hits, and Toronto won 9–0.

While with the Pacific Coast League and the Portland Beavers, Martin was reported as their southpaw pitcher. Tom Turner was their manager as they reported to the training camp in San Jose, California. A large photo exists showing the Los Angeles vs Portland teams before the April 7, 1935, game.

Patrick F. Martin died at the age of 54 years on February 4, 1949, in New York City.
