= Chuck Martin =

Chuck Martin may refer to:

- Chuck Martin (American football) (born 1968), American football coach
- Chuck Martin (basketball) (born 1969), American college basketball coach
- Chuck Martin (politician) (born 1961), American politician
- Chuck Martin (skier) (born 1967), American skier

== See also ==
- Charles Martin (disambiguation)
