= Parotocinclus haroldoi =

Conservation status
- Least Concern (IUCN 3.1)

Scientific classification
- Kingdom: Animalia
- Phylum: Chordata
- Class: Actinopterygii
- Order: Siluriformes
- Family: Loricariidae
- Genus: Parotocinclus
- Species: P. haroldoi

Binomial name
- Parotocinclus haroldoi Garavello, 1988

Species of fish

Parotocinclus haroldoi is a species of freshwater ray-finned fish belonging to the family Loricariidae, the suckermouth armoured catfishes, and the subfamily Hypoptopomatinae, the cascudinhos. This catfish is endemic to Brazil.

== Taxonomy ==
Parotocinclus haroldoi was first formally described in 1988 by the Brazilian ichthyologist Julio C. Garavello with its type locality given as the Otaviano stream, Poço do Sanharó, Riacho Sanharó in the Brazilian state of Piauí. Eschmeyer's Catalog of Fishes classifies the genus Parotocinclus in the subfamily Hypoptopomatinae, the cascudinhos, within the suckermouth armoured catfish family Loricariidae.

== Etymology ==
Parotocinclus haroldoi is classified in the genus Parotocinclus, is a combination of para, meaning "near", and the genus Otocinclus, the genus the type species, P. maculicauda was originally thought to be a member of. The specific name, honours the Brazilian ichthyologist Heraldo A. Britski, who loaned Garavello many specimens, and assisted him with his manuscript for the description of this species.

== Description ==
Parotocinclus haroldoi reaches a standard length of 3.5 cm (1.4 in). This species can be told apart from other species in its genus by its abdomen being wholly covered in relatively large plates, the other species either being naked or having small plates. This species has 26 teeth on the premaxilla and between 18 and 26 on the dentary. The presence of a well developed adipose fin also helps to identify this species. The background colour of the back and sides is dark brown to greyish, the underside is yellow. There are four indistinct paler bars on the upper body with the back and sides also having some small, yellow elongated spots. The fins are striped with brown and yellow.

== Distribution ==
Parotocinclus haroldoi is endemic to Brazil where it occurs in the Parnaíba River in both the main channel and in the tributaries of Gurgueia, Piauí-Canindé, Poti and Longà rivers in the states of Ceará, Piauí and Maranhão. This species is found in rivers with a moderate current in the vegetation zones known as the Cerrado and Caatinga.
