= Ceará-Piauí border dispute =

Territorial dispute between Brazilian states

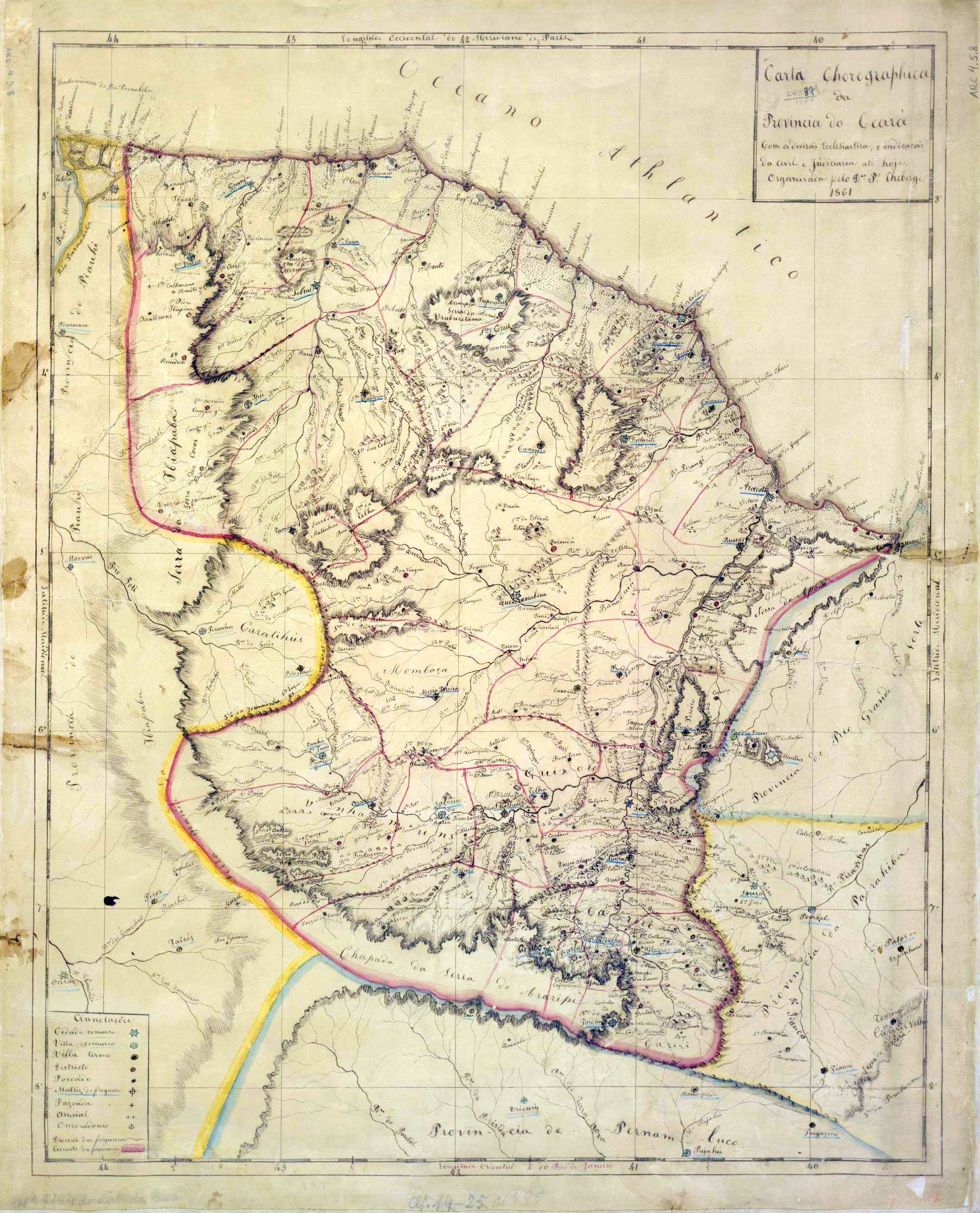
A 1861 map of Ceará, without the municipalities of Crateús and Independência.

A vast region of 3,000 km^{2} at Serra de Ibiapaba is claimed by the Brazilian states of Ceará and Piauí. The regions became popularly known as Cerapió and Piocerá.

== Background ==
The dispute dates back to the colonial government of Manuel Inácio de Sampaio e Pina Freire in Ceará, when engineer Silva Paulet presented a map of the then-province which showed the west coastline border reaching the mouth of Igaraçu River. As such, the location known as Amarração, currently Luís Correia, would be part of Ceará's territory.

During the 19th century Amarração was assisted by the neighboring Ceará city of Granja, until 1874, when the state deputies decided to grant Amarração village status. This caught the attention of politicians from Piauí, who claimed the territory. A solution arose with the General Decree 3.012, of 22 November 1880, determining that there would be an exchange in which Piauí would reestablish its coastline and Ceará would incorporate the municipalities of Crateús and Independência.

Since then, the border of Ceará and Piauí features several points of indefiniteness and both states keep claiming those places. According to Ceará state deputy Neto Nunes (PMDB), the indefiniteness persists because "Piauí wants a part of the range that is fertile and has good weather, inns, a touristic region of the state", while the land exchanged for the coastline would be of pure sertão.

== Pending solution proposal ==
After the 1988 constitution, it was proposed that the dispute would be settled, but it wasn't until 2008 that an actual agreement was presented, one that would give Piauí 1,500 hectares and 1,000 to Ceará. In October 2011, however, the talks were disturbed by Piauí's decision to resort to Supremo Tribunal Federal (STF) with a public civil act, claiming a 2,821 km^{2} area that currently belongs to Ceará.

If STF accepts Piauí's request, Ceará would lose 66% of Poranga, 32% of Croatá, 21% of Guaraciaba do Norte, 18% of Carnaubal, 8% of Crateús and 7% of Ipaporanga.

== Involved populations ==
The population in the disputed area are supposedly using health and education systems provided by the government of Ceará. According to the deputy general-prosecutor of Piauí, João Batista de Freitas Júnior, the government of Ceará is irregularly providing such services, since they're not part of either states.

Due to the conflict, most of the local population is deprived of public medical assistance and public security services. According to a story published in Diário do Nordeste, people from Cocal dos Alves must go to Viçosa do Ceará in order to have access to public health. According to Sérgio Fontenele, infrastructure secretary of Viçosa do Ceará, mayor Pedro da Silva Brito has ordered medical posts to treat every patient regardless of their state of origin, "but we pay the bill while Piauí enjoy the services".

According to him, around 100 families are found in this situation.
