= Canindé River (Piauí) =

Location
- Country: Brazil

Physical characteristics
- Source
  - location: Piaui/Pernambuco border
  - elevation: 522 m (1,713 ft)
- Mouth
  - location: Parnaiba River
  - elevation: 104 m (341 ft)
- Length: 350 km (220 mi)

The Canindé River is a seasonal waterway flowing into the Parnaiba River near Amarante in the State of Piauí in northeastern Brazil. The stream flows for approx. 350 km from headwaters in the foothills on the Piauí/Pernambuco border (northwest of Afrânio, Pernambuco) northwest into Piauí then through Paulistana and Oeiras to Amarante on the junction of the Canindé with the Parnaíba. Oeiras is the main commercial center in the Canindé River valley. The biome type along the river is caatinga, which is composed of typical northeastern Brazilian semiarid vegetation. The river and fauna and flora of the environs were described by the German naturalists Johann Baptist von Spix and Carl Friedrich Philipp von Martius during their travels in Brazil in April and May, 1819.

The Canindé and its tributary the Piauí River (Note: Originally Piauhi, the river from which the province derives its name) which enters it about 125 km below Oeiras, constitute what is often referred to as the Canindé-Piauí river system. The Canindé / Piauí River basin with an area of approximately 75,000 km^{2}, is the largest sub-basin (29.7%) of the Parnaíba River Basin, which constitutes 98.3% of the land area of the State of Piauí.

The Canindé-Piauí river system and its tributaries present a temporary torrential flow regime: flow rate is characterized by abrupt variations due to tropical storms during the January - April rainy season.

Among the land-based economic activities of the Rio Canindé valley are the exploitation of Brazilian Wax palms (Copernicia prunifera) for the manufacture of carnauba wax, the extraction and commercialization of rubber from the Pará rubber tree (Hevea brasiliensis), and maniçoba (tapioca) from the Manioc plant (Manihot esculenta), and cattle ranching including dairy farming.

== Etymology ==
The name of the river comes from the Tupi-Guarani Kanindé, and has several meanings:

- a tribe of Indians that inhabited the banks of rivers Quixeramobim and Banabuiú;
- a large tribe of the Tarairyu nation, that lived in the central region of the backlands of Ceará (Quixada, Canindé and High Banabuiú, Quixeramobim);
- a macaw with blue and yellow plumage, specifically Canindéyu from Kanindé, blue macaw + ju, yellow: the blue-and-yellow macaw (Ara ararauna, called Arara-caninde in Portuguese).

== See also ==
- List of rivers of Piauí
