= Gurguéia River =

Coordinates: 06°50′S 43°24′W

Location
- Country: Brazil

Physical characteristics
- Source
  - location: Piauí state

The Gurguéia River is a river in Piauí state of northeastern Brazil. The Gurguéia is a tributary of the Parnaíba River, which originates in the Chapada das Mangabeiras in the southern portion of the state, and flows north to join the Parnaíba. The Serra Uruçui separates the Gurguéia basin from the Uruçui-Preto basin to the west, and the Serra da Capivara separates the Gurguéia basin from that of the Piauí to the east.

The Cerrado savannas occupy most of the Gurguéia basin, while several large enclaves of Atlantic dry forest lie east of the river, separating the Cerrado from the dry Caatinga shrublands further east.
