= List of rivers of Piauí =

This list of rivers in the Brazilian State of Piauí is arranged by drainage basin, with respective tributaries indented under each larger stream's name and ordered from downstream to upstream. All rivers in Piauí drain to the Atlantic Ocean.

== By Drainage Basin ==
- Parnaíba River
  - Piranji River
  - Longá River
    - Piracuruca River
    - Dos Matos River
    - Maratasã River
    - Corrente River
  - Poti River
    - Berlengas River
    - Sambito River
      - São Nicolau River
    - Cais River
    - Capivara River
  - Canindé River
    - Piauí River
      - Mitéuca River
      - Fidalgo River
    - Itaim River
  - Itaueira River
  - Gurguéia River
    - Esfolado River
    - Paraim River
  - Uruçuí Prêto River
  - Riozinho River
  - Uruçuí-Vermelho River

== Alphabetically ==
- Berlengas River
- Cais River
- Canindé River
- Capivara River
- Corrente River
- Dos Matos River
- Esfolado River
- Fidalgo River
- Gurguéia River
- Itaim River
- Itaueira River
- Longá River
- Maratasã River
- Mitéuca River
- Paraim River
- Parnaíba River
- Piauí River
- Piracuruca River
- Piranji River
- Poti River
- Riozinho River
- Sambito River
- São Nicolau River
- Uruçuí Prêto River
- Uruçuí-Vermelho River
