= Capivara River (Piauí) =

Location
- Country: Brazil

Physical characteristics
- Source
  - location: Piauí state
- Mouth: Poti River
  - coordinates: 5°00′53″S 41°29′55″W

The Capivara River is a river of Piauí state in northeastern Brazil.

== See also ==
- List of rivers of Piauí
