= Itaueira River =

- Location within Brazil
- Native name: Rio Itaueira (Portuguese)

Location
- Country: Brazil

Physical characteristics
- Source
  - location: Piauí state
- Mouth
  - coordinates: 6.676667°S 42.925278°W

Basin features
- River system: Parnaíba River

The Itaueira River is a river of Piauí state in northeastern Brazil, a tributary of the Parnaíba River.

The river, which is intermittent, rises in the 823,843 hectares (2,035,760 acres) Serra das Confusões National Park, created in 1998, which protects an area of the Caatinga biome.

== See also ==
- List of rivers of Piauí
