= Dos Matos River =

Location
- Country: Brazil

Physical characteristics
- Source
  - location: Piauí state
- Mouth: Longá River
  - coordinates: 3°52′15″S 41°59′26″W

The Dos Matos River is a river of Piauí state in northeastern Brazil.

== See also ==
- List of rivers of Piauí
