= Igarassu =

Igarassu may refer to:

- Igarassu, Pernambuco, a city in state of Pernambuco
- Igaraçu River, a river in state of Piauí
- Igaraçu do Tietê, a municipality in the state of São Paulo
- Igarassu River, Pernambuco, a river in state of Pernambuco
