= Croata =

Croata may refer to:

- Croatá, a place in Brazil
- Croatina, a wine grape variety
- Croatia, a country in Europe
- Ivan Lacković Croata, Croatian naive painter
