= Itaim River (Piauí) =

Location
- Country: Brazil

Physical characteristics
- Source
  - location: Piauí state

The Itaim River is a river of Piauí state in northeastern Brazil.

== See also ==
- List of rivers of Piauí
