= Cais River =

Coordinates: 5°21′39″S 41°51′40″W

Location
- Country: Brazil

Physical characteristics
- Source
  - location: Piauí state

The Cais River is a river of Piauí state in northeastern Brazil.

== See also ==
- List of rivers of Piauí
