= Piracuruca River =

Coordinates: 3°45′S 41°58′W

Location
- Country: Brazil

Physical characteristics
- Source
  - location: Piauí state

The Piracuruca River is a river of Piauí state in northeastern Brazil.

== See also ==
- List of rivers of Piauí
