= Uruçuí-Vermelho River =

Coordinates: 9°28′55″S 45°47′25″W

Location
- Country: Brazil

Physical characteristics
- Source
  - location: Piauí state

The Uruçuí-Vermelho River is a river of Piauí state in northeastern Brazil.

== See also ==
- List of rivers of Piauí
