= Quixeramobim =

Quixeramobim may refer to:

- Quixeramobim, Ceará, a city and municipality in state of Ceará
- Quixeramobim River, a river in the state of Ceará
- Quixeramobim Dam, a dam in the state of Ceará
