= Brazilian cargo ship Parnahyba =

Brazilian-owned cargo ship that was sunk in 1942

History
- Name: 1913: Alrich; 1917: Parnahyba
- Namesake: 1917: Parnaíba River
- Owner: 1913: Roland-Linie; 1917 Government of Brazil; 1927: Lloyd Brasileiro
- Operator: 1921: Government of France; 1923: Lloyd Brasileiro
- Port of registry: 1913: (German Empire) Bremen; 1917: (Brazil) Rio de Janeiro
- Builder: Flensburger Schiffbau, Flensburg
- Yard number: 327
- Launched: January 25, 1913
- Completed: March 1913
- Identification: 1914: code letters QKGD; by 1914: call sign DAQ; by 1934: call sign PUBU
- Fate: sunk by torpedo, May 1, 1942

General characteristics
- Type: cargo ship
- Tonnage: 6,692 GRT, 4,126 NRT
- Length: 460.5 ft (140.4 m)
- Beam: 59.1 ft (18.0 m)
- Draught: 31 ft 6 in (9.60 m)
- Depth: 28.8 ft (8.8 m)
- Decks: 2
- Installed power: 1 × quadruple-expansion engine: 670 NHP
- Propulsion: 1 × screw
- Speed: 12 knots (22 km/h)
- Crew: 1942: 71
- Armament: 1942: one 5-inch (130 mm) naval gun
- Notes: sister ship: Alda

Parnahyba was a cargo steamship. She was built in Germany for Roland-Linie in 1913 as Alrich. She became Parnahyba in 1917, when Brazil seized her and renamed her after the Parnaíba River. Lloyd Brasileiro was managing Parnahyba by 1923, and owned her by 1927.

In May 1942 a U-boat sank Parnahyba in the North Atlantic, killing seven of her crew. She was the seventh ship attacked since the beginning of the war, and the sixth after Brazil terminated diplomatic relations with the Axis powers in January 1942.

She was the first of two Roland-Linie ships to be called Alrich. The second was built in 1921 as Glücksburg; bought by Roland-Linie in 1923 and renamed Alrich; and transferred in 1925 or 1926 to Norddeutscher Lloyd. Hamburg Südamerikanische DG bought her in 1937 and renamed her São Paulo. A mine sank her in 1940.

She was also the first of two Lloyd Brasileiro ships to be named after the Parnaíba River. The second was a Type C1-M-AV1 motor ship that was built in 1945 as Blackwall Hitch. Lloyd Brasileiro bought her in 1947 and renamed her Rio Parnaíba. She was scrapped in 1969.

== A class of cargo ships ==
Between 1912 and 1914, Roland-Linie took delivery of a class of four new cargo ships. AG Weser in Bremen built Roland in 1912 and Raimund in 1914. Joh. C. Tecklenborg in Bremerhaven built Alda in 1913, and Flensburger Schiffbau-Gesellschaft in Flensburg built Alrich, also in 1913. All four were built to a similar specification, with four masts; two decks; one screw; and one quadruple-expansion steam engine. Alda and Alrich were slightly shorter and broader than Roland and Raimund.

== Building and registration ==
Flensburger Schiffbau built Alrich as yard number 327. She was launched on January 25, 1913, and completed that March. Her registered length was 460.5 ft (140.4 m); her beam was 59.1 ft (18.0 m); her depth was 28.8 ft (8.8 m); and her draught was 31 ft 6 in (9.60 m). Her tonnages were 6,692 GRT and 4,126 NRT. Her engine was rated at 670 NHP, and gave her a speed of 12 knots (22 km/h).

Roland-Linie registered Alrich in Bremen. Her code letters were QKGD. She was equipped with wireless telegraphy. By 1914, her German call sign was DAQ.

== Brazilian service ==
Alrich was in Rio de Janeiro when the First World War began, and she remained there to avoid Entente naval patrols. In February 1917, Germany resumed unrestricted submarine warfare. That April and May, German U-boats sank three Brazilian steamships. On April 11, Brazil terminated diplomatic relations with Germany. On June 2, Brazil seized 46 German merchant ships that were sheltering in Brazilian ports. They included Alrich and Roland in Rio de Janeiro, which were renamed Parnahyba and Ayuroca respectively.

Parnahyba was registered in Rio de Janeiro. By 1921, the Government of France had chartered her. Companhia de Navegação Lloyd Brasileiro was managing her by 1923, and owned her by 1927. By 1934, her four-letter call sign was PUBU, and this had superseded her code letters.

== Loss ==
On April 5, 1942, Parnahyba left Rio de Janeiro. She called at Recife in Pernambuco, where she left on April 24, bound for New York. Her Master was Captain Raul Francisco Diégoli. She carried 70 other officers and men, and one passenger, and was defensively armed with one 5-inch (130 mm) naval gun on her poop.

On May 1, Parnahyba was about 220 miles east of Trinidad, and a similar distance north of British Guiana, steaming at 10 1/2 knots (19 km/h). At 14:46 hrs local time (20:46 hrs Central European Time), on a calm sea in clear weather, U-162 fired one torpedo at her. It struck her port side, aft of amidships, breaching the empty port bunker. Six men were killed in her engine room: her Third Engineer; three stokers; and three trimmers. The explosion also destroyed one of her four lifeboats.

Parnahyba was sinking slowly by the stern. Captain Diégoli immediately ordered her crew to abandon ship in her remaining three lifeboats. Her wireless officer transmitted a distress signal. By the time he had sent the signal, all three boats had been launched. Wearing a life jacket, he jumped overboard, and swam to one of the boats. However, just as he reached the boat, a shark caught him, and dragged him underwater to his death.

Ten minutes later, after the three boats were clear of the ship, U-162 surfaced. The U-boat fired 66 rounds from her 105 mm deck gun and 20 rounds from her 37 mm anti-aircraft gun, setting Parnahyba on fire. Two and a half hours later the cargo ship sank, at position 10°12′N 57°16′W .

== Rescue ==
After the sinking, Captain Diégoli set a course for the lifeboats to head for land. But the weather roughened, with wind and large waves that threatened to capsize the lifeboats. At dawn the next day, a patrolling US flying boat sighted the lifeboats, and landed to provide drinking water and provisions. An hour later, the plane returned, and dropped parachute flares above the lifeboats to mark their position.

Half an hour later, the Spanish cargo ship Cabo de Hornos found one of the lifeboats, and rescued its occupants. On the afternoon of May 3, the Canadian motor ship Turret Cape found one of the lifeboats, and rescued its 26 occupants. The next day, she landed them at Georgetown, British Guiana. The other lifeboat was not found, but its 16 occupants successfully sailed her to Trinidad.

== Bibliography ==
- Lloyd's Register of Shipping. Vol. I.–Steamers. London: Lloyd's Register of Shipping. 1914 – via Internet Archive.
- Lloyd's Register of Shipping. Vol. II.–Steamers. London: Lloyd's Register of Shipping. 1917 – via Internet Archive.
- Lloyd's Register of Shipping. Vol. II.–Steamers. London: Lloyd's Register of Shipping. 1921 – via Internet Archive.
- Lloyd's Register of Shipping. Vol. II.–Steamers and Motor Vessels. London: Lloyd's Register of Shipping. 1923 – via Internet Archive.
- Lloyd's Register of Shipping. Vol. II.–Steamers and Motorships. London: Lloyd's Register of Shipping. 1927 – via Internet Archive.
- Lloyd's Register of Shipping. Vol. II.–Steamers and Motorships of 300 tons gross and over. London: Lloyd's Register of Shipping. 1934 – via Southampton City Council.
- Lloyd's Register of Shipping. Vol. II.–Steamers and Motorships of 300 tons gross and over. London: Lloyd's Register of Shipping. 1938 – via Southampton City Council.
- Lloyd's Register of Shipping. Vol. II. M–Z. London: Lloyd's Register of Shipping. 1948 – via Internet Archive.
- The Marconi Press Agency Ltd (1914). The Year Book of Wireless Telegraphy and Telephony. London: The Marconi Press Agency Ltd.
- The Marconi Press Agency Ltd (1918). The Year Book of Wireless Telegraphy and Telephony. London: The Wireless Press, Ltd.
- Sander, Roberto (2007). O Brasil na mira de Hitler: a história do afundamento de navios brasileiros pelos nazistas (in Brazilian Portuguese). Rio de Janeiro: Objetiva.
