= Longa River =

Longa River can mean:

- Longa River (Angola)
- Longá River in Brazil
