= Piranji River (Piauí) =

Location
- Country: Brazil

Physical characteristics
- Source
  - location: Piauí state
- Mouth: Parnaíba River
  - coordinates: 3°05′52″S 41°53′57″W

The Piranji River is a river located in the state of Piauí, northeastern Brazil.

== See also ==
- List of rivers of Piauí
