= Igaraçu River =

Coordinates: 2°52′S 41°39′W

Location
- Country: Brazil
- State: Piauí

The Igaraçu River, also called the Igarassu River, is a distributary of the Parnaíba River in northern Piauí state in Brazil. It flows from its origin on the Parnaiba River southwest of the city of Parnaíba to the mouth on the Atlantic Ocean near the city of Luís Correia.

The river has sections classified as Environmental protection area by ICMBio.

== See also ==
- List of rivers of Piauí
