= Sambito River =

Coordinates: 5°39′07″S 42°09′21″W

Location
- Country: Brazil

Physical characteristics
- Source
  - location: Piauí state

The Sambito River is a river of Piauí state in northeastern Brazil.

== See also ==
- List of rivers of Piauí
