= Piranji River =

There are two rivers named Piranji River in Brazil:

- Piranji River (Pernambuco), a river of Pernambuco
- Piranji River (Piauí)
