= Maratasã River =

Coordinates: 4°13′S 42°15′W

Location
- Country: Brazil

Physical characteristics
- Source
  - location: Piauí state

The Maratasã River is a river of Piauí state in northeastern Brazil.

== See also ==
- List of rivers of Piauí
