= São Nicolau River =

Coordinates: 5°44′34″S 42°06′22″W

Location
- Country: Brazil

Physical characteristics
- Source
  - location: Piauí state

The São Nicolau River is a river of Piauí state in northeastern Brazil.

== See also ==
- List of rivers of Piauí
