= Saci Day =

Day created by Amigos do Saci

Saci Day, in Portuguese Dia do Saci (pronounced [ˈdʒi.ɐ du saˈsi]), is a day created by a Brazilian cultural non-governmental organization named Amigos do Saci to oppose the "American-influenced" holiday of Halloween. The Day of Saci is commemorated on the same day as the American holiday, October 31st. It was designed as a celebration of Brazil's culture and folklore, but few Brazilians commemorate it, even with official support in São Paulo state and a few municipalities.

== History ==
Halloween celebrations in Brazil started in 1988 at Playcenter Park, where it was an important celebration with "Noites de Terror" (Horror Nights in Portuguese). The real push towards the popularization of the festivity was given by Alemdalenda Shops later. In the last week of October in Brazil, many stores are decorated with pumpkins and dark colors and adorned with Halloween products.

Trying to oppose the American influence on Brazilian culture, deemed a distraction from its rich heritage, the NGO Amigos do Saci established Saci Day. The initiative was strongly supported by artists, educators, politicians and a good portion of society, and was turned into an official date in São Paulo state (Law nº 11.669, January 13th 2004), as well as other municipalities: São Paulo, São Luiz do Paraitinga, São José do Rio Preto, Guaratinguetá, Embu das Artes and Caçapava (São Paulo); Vitória (Espírito Santo); Poços de Caldas (Minas Gerais); and Fortaleza (Ceará).

In Uberaba, the city hall established the date in 2008. However, the date was revoked in 2017 after the creation of the Municipal Folklore Day, celebrated on August 22nd. In Independência, the date was also repealed a few years after its establishment.

In 2019, a city councilor in Cuiabá proposed establishing the date in the city. However, the proposal received strong opposition and criticism from other councilors and the evangelical caucus in the City Council. Due to the projected negative impact and faced with the pressure, the author withdrew the project from the agenda.

However, the holiday ended up not being popularized, precisely because it contrasted with Halloween, which was popular given the global influence of Western culture.

== Saci ==
The Saci, also called Saci-pererê, is the best known character of Brazilian folklore, having originated as a Guaraní legend in the Jesuit reductions of southern Brazil. In some regions, the Saci appears as an evil being, in others, as a playful and graceful creature. In northern Brazil, African influence transformed the Saci into a little black boy who is always smoking a pito (a kind of pipe) and has lost one of his legs in a Capoeira fight. Europeans also contributed to the legend, so the Saci got a pileus, a little red cap used by the legendary troll (a small enchanted rebel creature native to northern Portugal, especially the region of Trás-os-Montes). Saci possesses supernatural powers and makes mischief indoors, especially at night; he is able to turn himself into wind and disguise himself inside an apparently hollow bottle – once an unknowing person opens it, he is free and able to continue his trickery.
