= Corrente River (Piauí) =

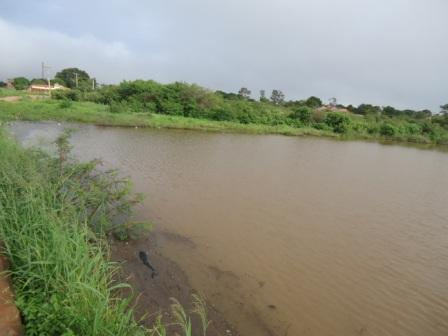

Location
- Country: Brazil

Physical characteristics
- Source
  - location: Piauí state

The Corrente River is a river of Piauí state in northeastern Brazil.

== See also ==
- List of rivers of Piauí
