= Poosting (social website) =

Brazilian social network

- Website type: Social networking service
- Founded: 2025
- Area served: Worldwide
- Creator: Afonso Alcântara
- Website: https://poosting.com/

Poosting is a Brazilian social network created in the state of Ceará in 2025, focusing on the freedom of digital interaction, reducing dependence on algorithms, and combating misinformation. The platform allows users to post texts, images, and videos, participate in thematic communities, follow content in a chronological feed, and interact using alternative metrics to the traditional model of likes and followers.

== History ==
The project was conceived by the Ceará-based entrepreneur Afonso Alcântara, initially as an alternative to social networks dominated by algorithms that affect organic reach and prioritize sponsored content. According to Alcântara, the objective was to offer a more transparent experience, focused on freedom of expression, but with moderation mechanisms and efforts to combat misinformation.

The launch occurred officially at the beginning of 2025, and quickly the platform gained prominence in regional and national media. In just a few months, the network reached about 130 thousand registered users, with a market valuation estimated at R$6 million.

== Financing ==
In March 2025, Poosting was one of the Brazilian startups selected for the international Google Cloud for Startups program. The initiative provided the company with R$1.5 million in cloud credits, mentorships, technical support, and access to artificial intelligence tools and scalable infrastructure.

In January 2025, Poosting received investments amounting to R$6 million.

== Functionalities ==
The platform offers a set of features that aim to differentiate it from other social networks:

- Chronological feed: content is displayed in the order of publication, without algorithmic curation.
- Alternative engagement system: allows users to vote positively or negatively on posts, without displaying the number of likes or followers.
- Communities: thematic spaces inspired by the model of the former Orkut, where members can share and discuss specific topics.
- Post ranking: weekly, the platform presents the most relevant content based on real interactions.
- News aggregator: integration with verified journalistic sources to combat misinformation.
- External integrations: support for content from platforms like Spotify and YouTube, without leaving the Poosting environment.

== Popularity ==
In June 2025, Poosting was listed as the sixth most downloaded social network on Android worldwide, even surpassing Bluesky.

Social network created by a Ceará native surpasses Bluesky in Android ranking In the air for 5 months, Poosting, a social network created by the Ceará native Afonso Alcântara, has surpassed the North American Bluesky in the ranking of recent downloads on the Android system, within the category of social networks.

== Repercussions ==
The platform was the subject of interviews and reports in various media outlets. In April 2025, the founder participated in the program "Leruaite com Falcão" on TVC-Ceará, and Rede Globo's "Pequenas Empresas Grandes Negócios" program, where he explained the principles of the network and its proposal for digital decentralization.

Several articles from the Ceará newspaper Diário do Nordeste covered the trajectory of Poosting, highlighting

- Social network created by a Ceará native reaches 130 thousand users and is already worth R$6 million
- Social network created by a Ceará native surpasses Bluesky in Android ranking
- Poosting: social network from Ceará reaches 130 thousand users, say owners
- CE: Social network already has 130 thousand users and is worth R$6 million
- Google invests in social network created in Ceará
- Ceará native creates social network and attracts attention from Silicon Valley companies

== See also ==
- Social networking service
- Internet no Brasil
- Startup
- Orkut

== Ligações externas ==
- https://poosting.com.br/
