= Uruçuí Prêto River =

Coordinates: 7°18′36″S 44°37′02″W

Uruçuí Preto River

Location
- Country: Brazil

Physical characteristics
- Source
  - location: Piauí state

The Uruçuí Preto River (spelled Prêto before 1971) is a river of Piauí state in northeastern Brazil.

== See also ==
- List of rivers of Piauí
