= Barreiras do Piauí =

Coordinates: 9.925°S 45.475°W

- Municipality
- Location in Piauí
- Country: Brazil
- Region: Nordeste
- State: Piauí
- Mesoregion: Sudoeste Piauiense

Population (2020)
  - Total: 3,352
- Time zone: UTC−3 (BRT)

Barreiras do Piauí is a municipality in the state of Piauí in the Northeast region of Brazil.

The municipality contains part of the 724,324 hectares (1,789,840 acres) Nascentes do Rio Parnaíba National Park, created in 2002.

== See also ==
- List of municipalities in Piauí
