= Chapada =

Plateau in the Brazilian Highlands

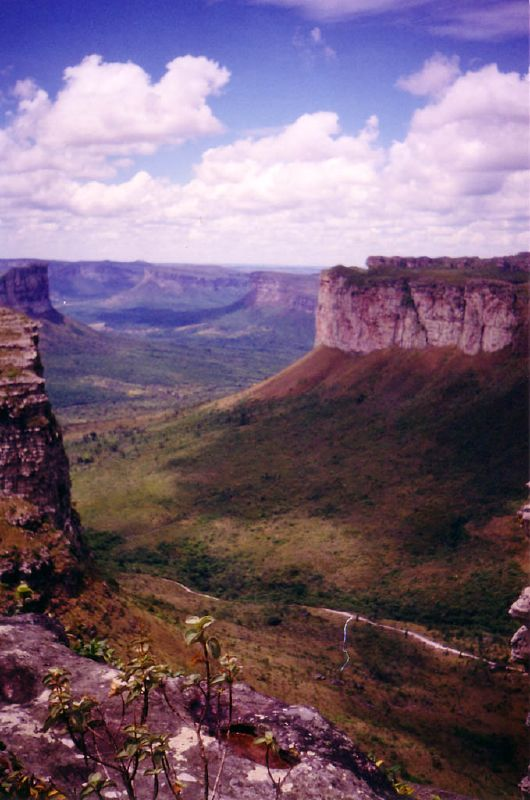
A view of Chapada Diamantina National Park in Bahia, Brazil

A chapada (Portuguese pronunciation: [ʃaˈpadɐ]) is a plateau found in the Brazilian Highlands. The chapadas, which are usually described as mountain ranges, are capped by horizontal strata of sandstone. They show the original surface, which has been worn away by the rivers, leaving here and there broad flat-topped ridges between river basins and narrower ranges of hills between river courses. From the valleys their rugged, deeply indented escarpments, stretching away to the horizon, they have the appearance of a continuous chain of mountains.

== See also ==
- Chapada do Araripe
- Chapada Diamantina
- Chapada dos Guimarães
- Chapada das Mangabeiras
- Chapada dos Veadeiros
