= Uruçuí =

- Municipality
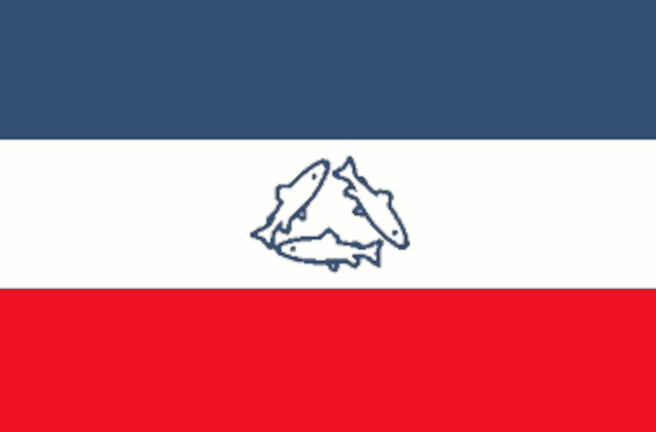
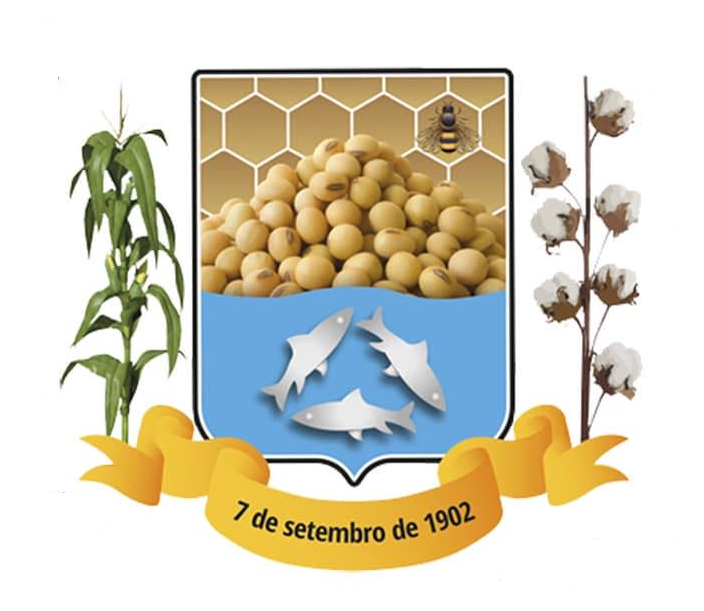
- Flag Coat of arms
- Nicknames: "Capital dos Cerrados" / "Cidade Futuro" (Capital of Cerrados / Future City)
- Location of Uruçuí in Piauí and Brazil
- Coordinates: 07°13′44″N 44°33′21″E
- Country: Brazil
- Region: Nordeste
- State: Piauí
- Mesoregion: Sudoeste Piauiense
- Founded: September 6, 1902

Government
  - Mayor: Valdir Soares da Costa (PT)
- Elevation: 548 ft (167 m)

Population (2020)
  - Total: 21,655
- Time zone: UTC−3 (BRT)
- HDI (2000): 0.701 – medium

Uruçuí is a municipality in the state of Piauí in the Northeast region of Brazil. It is the largest municipality in that state by area.

== See also ==
- List of municipalities in Piauí
