= Quixeramobim River =

Coordinates: 5°20′30″S 38°58′30″W

Location
- Country: Brazil

Physical characteristics
- Source
  - location: Ceará state

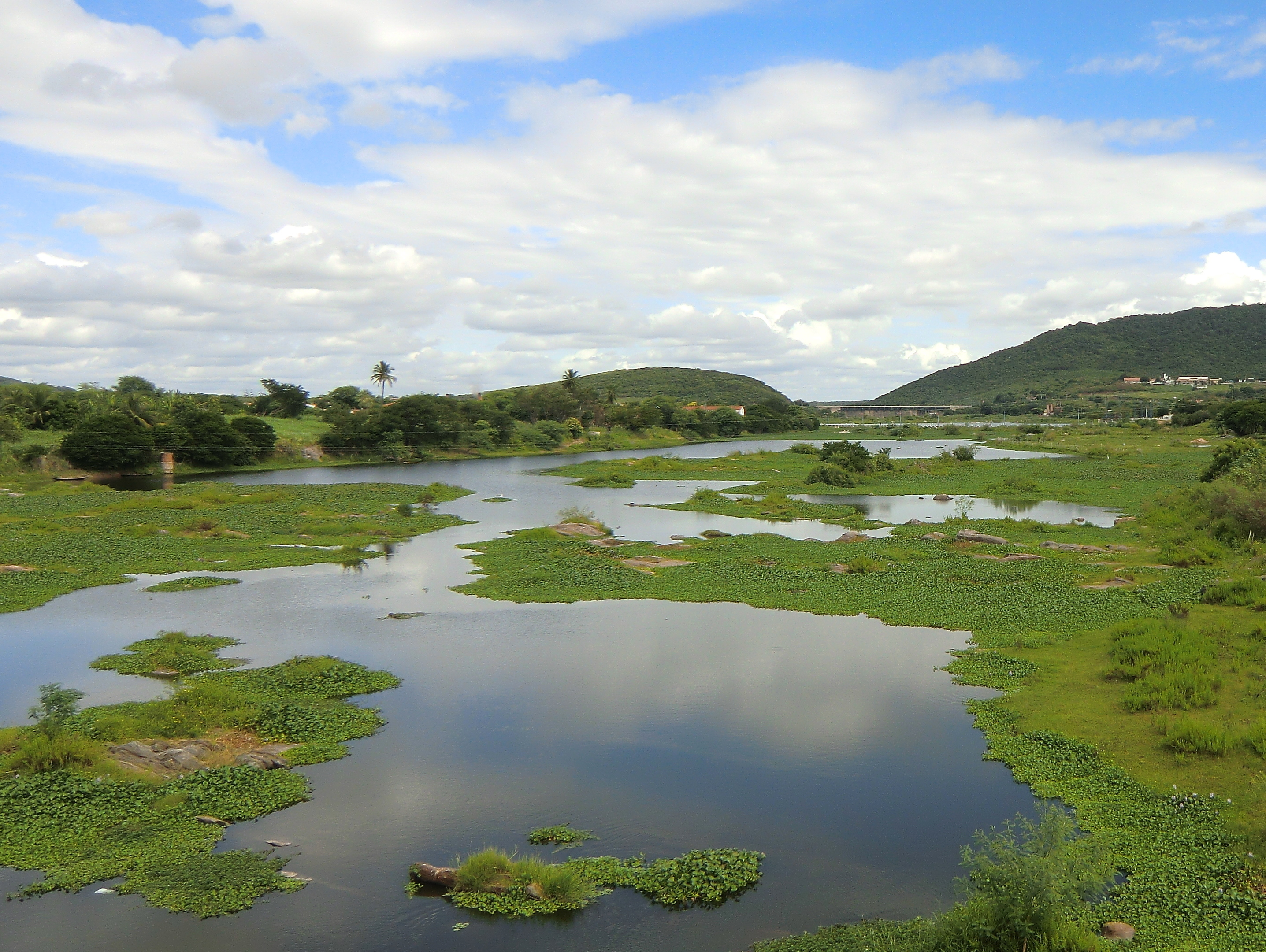
Rio Quixeramobim

The Quixeramobim River is a river that runs through the state of Ceará in northeastern Brazil. It was originally known by the Indians who inhabited the region as Rio Ibu. It rises in the Serra das Matas at Monsenhor Tabosa and Banhha and its mouth is on Rio Banabuiú, being one of its main tributaries. There are three municipalities on the river: Boa Viagem, Quixeramobim and Banabuiú. Its drainage basin also covers the municipality of Madalena, most of Itatira and a small part of Santa Quitéria.

Two dams creating reservoirs of the same name are on the river in the vicinity of Monsenhor Tabosa: the Quixeramobim with 54,000,000 m³ storage capacity, and Fogareiro, with a capacity of 118 820 000 m³, both in the municipality of Quixeramobim. These reservoirs are the main source of water for the three municipalities bordering the Quixeramobim.

== See also ==
- List of rivers of Ceará
