= Guaraciaba do Norte =

Municipality in Ceará, Brazil

Coordinates: 4°10′S 40°46′W

- Municipality
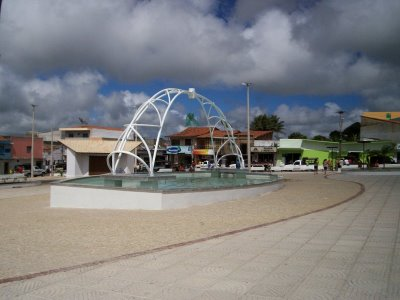

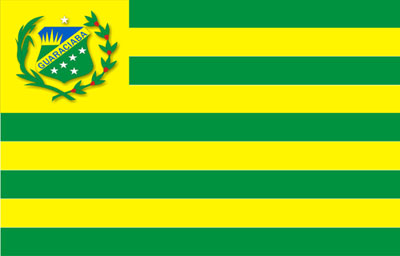
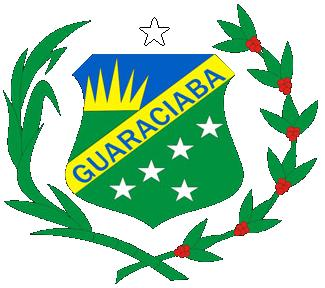
- Flag Coat of arms
- Interactive map of Guaraciaba do Norte
- Country: Brazil
- Region: Nordeste
- State: Ceará
- Mesoregion: Noroeste Cearense
- Microregion: Ibiapaba
- Established: May 12, 1791 (226 years)

Government
  - Type: Mayor-council
  - Mayor: Adail Machado (DEM)

Population (2020)
  - Total: 40,784
  - Density: 160.0/sq mi (61.78/km^{2})
- Time zone: UTC−3 (BRT)
- Website: http://www.guaraciabadonorte.ce.gov.br/

Guaraciaba do Norte is a municipality in the state of Ceará in the Northeast region of Brazil.

== See also ==
- List of municipalities in Ceará
