= Banabuiú =

Municipality in Ceará, Brazil

- Municipality
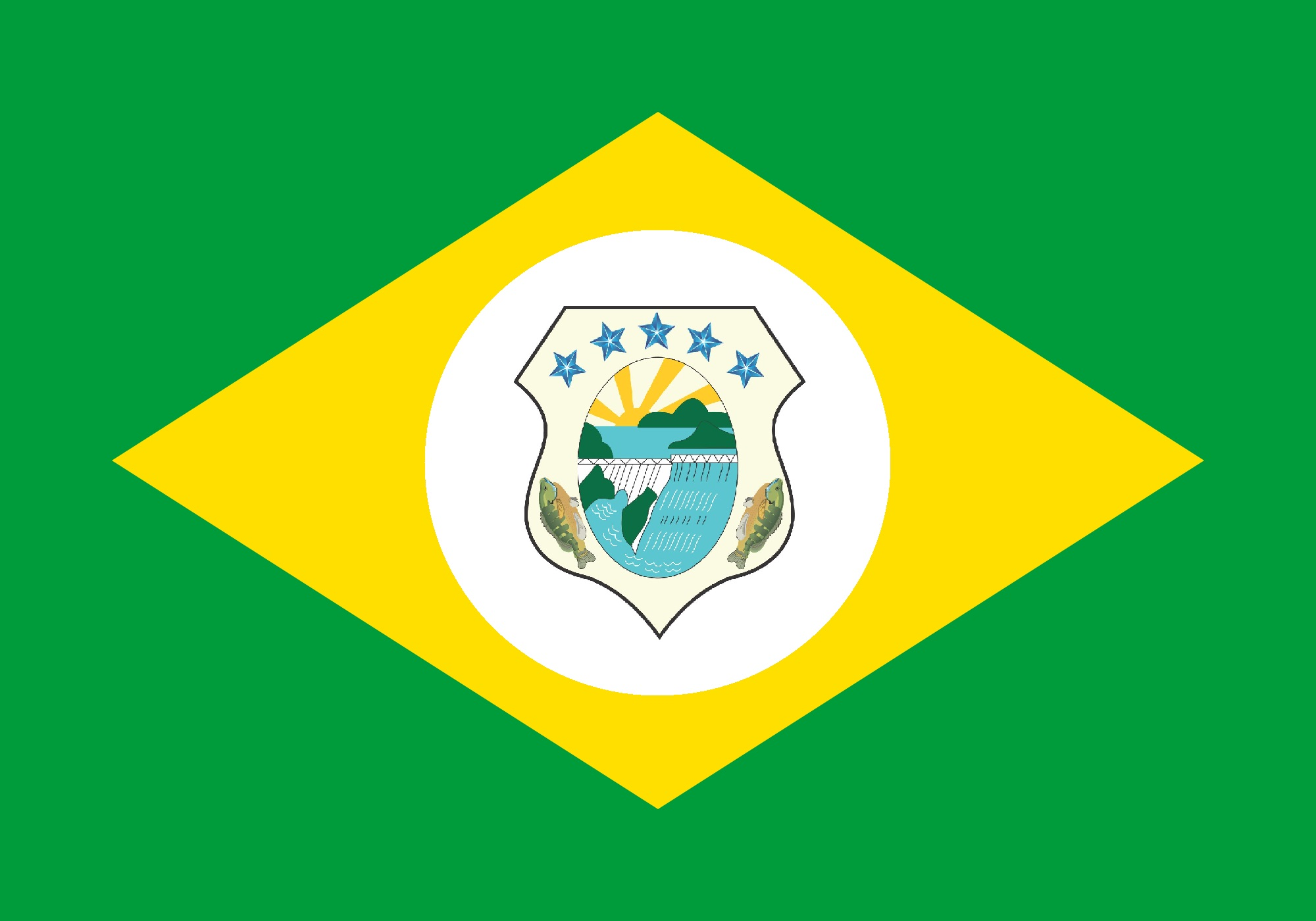
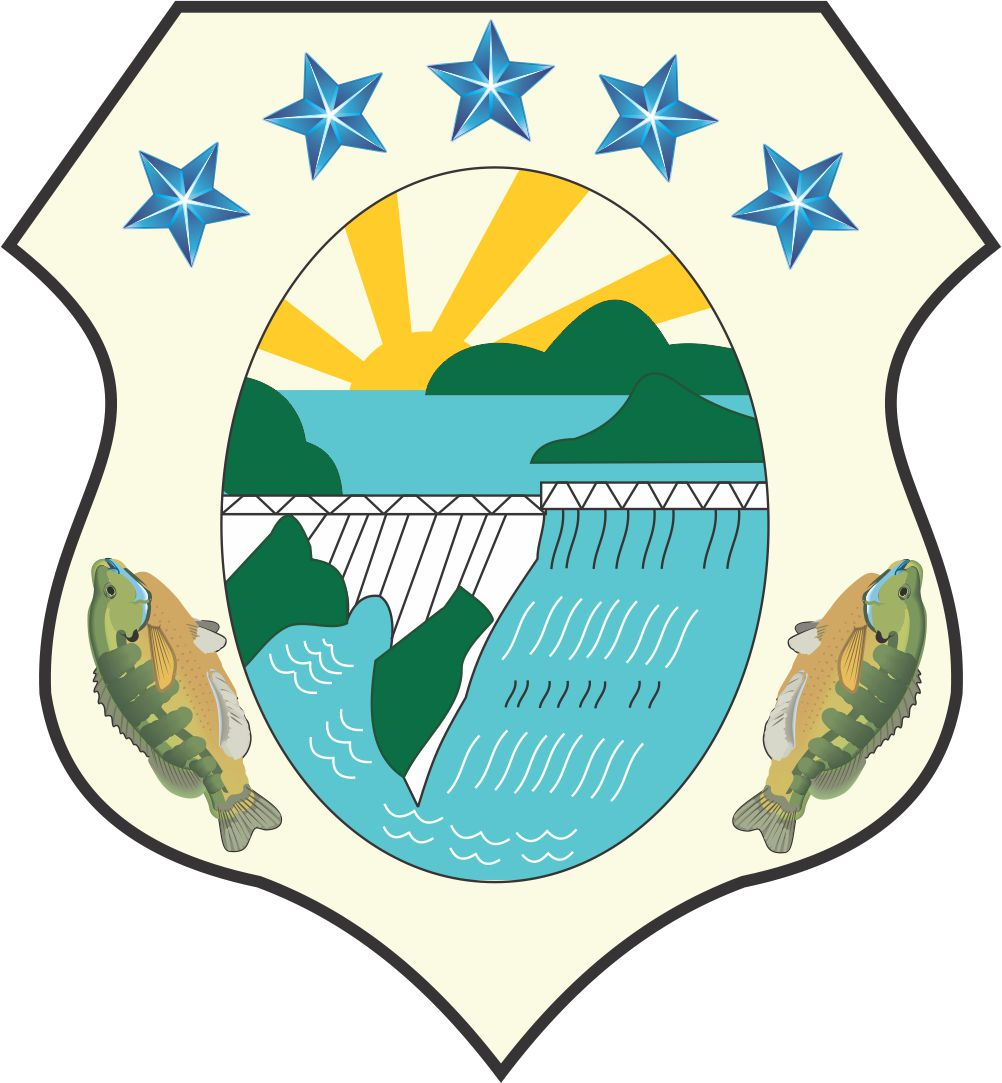
- Flag Coat of arms

- Location in Ceará state

- Location in Brazil
- Coordinates: 5°17′S 38°52′W
- Country: Brazil
- Region: Northeast
- State: Ceará

Population (2022)
  - Total: 17,195
- Time zone: UTC−3 (BRT)

Banabuiú is a municipality in the state of Ceará, in Brazil.
