= Chapada das Mangabeiras =

Mountain range in Brazil

Coordinates: 10°00′S 46°30′W

The Chapada das Mangabeiras is a mountain range in central Brazil. The range runs northwest–southeast, and separates the basin of the Tocantins River to the southwest from the upper basin of the Parnaiba River to the northeast. The range also forms the boundary between Tocantins state and the states of Maranhão and Piauí. The highest points of both states are located there. The points are unnamed locations, one measuring 804 meters (Maranhão), and the other, 860 meters (Piauí).
