= Longá River =

Coordinates: 3°09′17″S 41°55′55″W

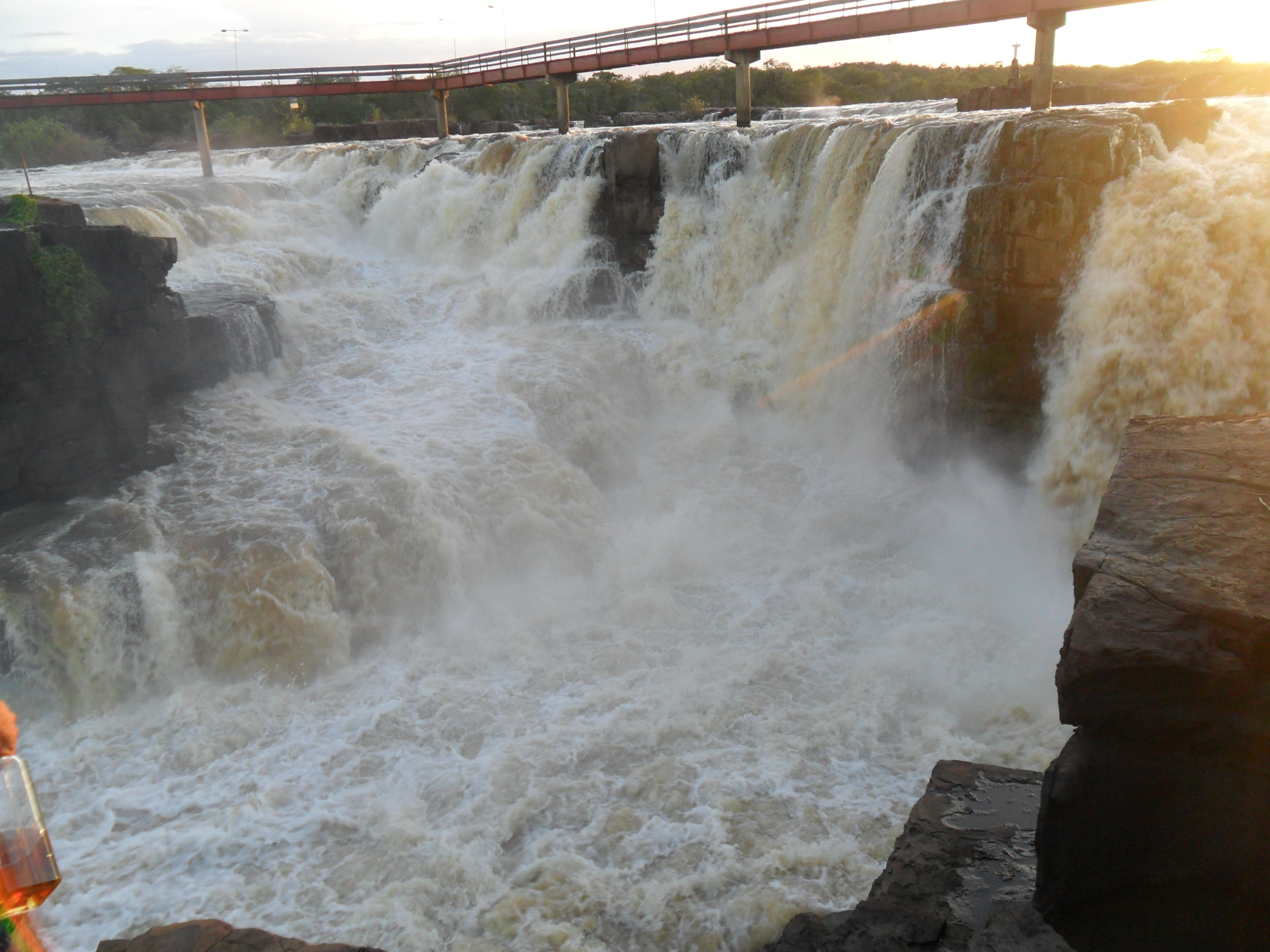

Location
- Country: Brazil

Physical characteristics
- Source
  - location: Piauí state

The Longá River is a river of Piauí state in northeastern Brazil.

== See also ==
- List of rivers of Piauí
