= Poti River =

River in Piauí, Brazil

Coordinates: 5°02′04″S 42°50′20″W

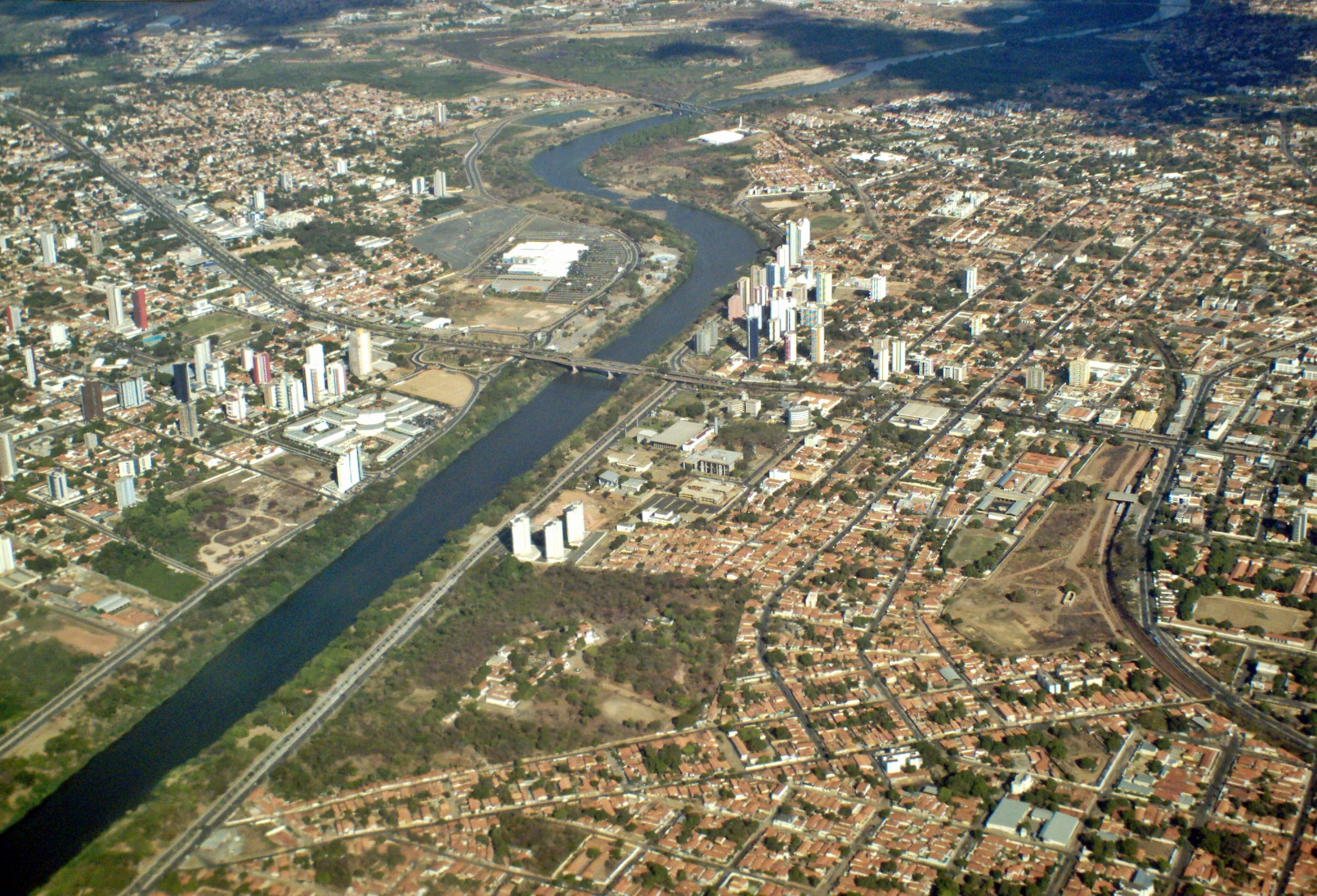
Aerial view of Teresina and Poti river

Poti River is a river in Brazil, a tributary of the Parnaíba River. The city of Teresina, state capital of Piauí, was formerly named Vila Nova do Poti after the river. It flows through the municipality of Parambu in the state of Ceará.
