= Independência, Ceará =

Municipality in Ceará, Brazil

Independência
- Municipality
- The Municipality of Independência
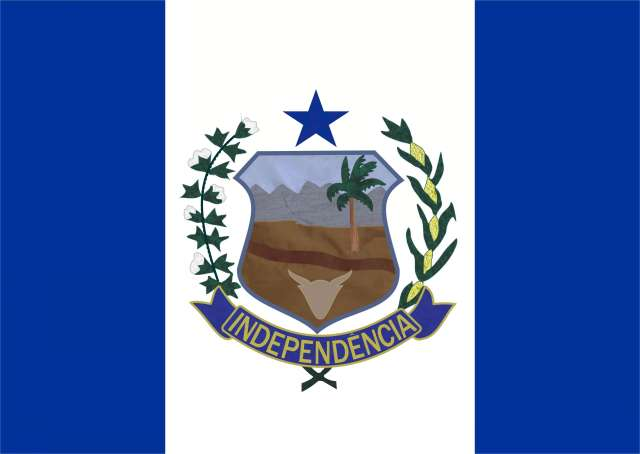
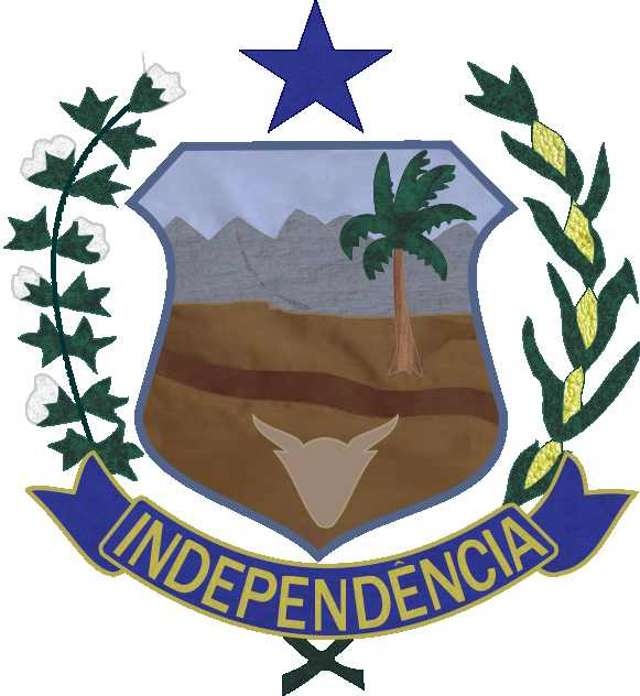
- Flag Coat of arms
- Nickname: "Porronca"
- Location of Independência in the State of Ceará
- Coordinates: 05°23′45″S 40°18′32″W
- Country: Brazil
- Region: Northeast
- State: Ceará
- Founded: July 24, 1857

Government
  - Mayor: José Valdi Coutinho (PMDB)

Area
  - Total: 3,218.641 km^{2} (1,242.724 sq mi)
- Elevation: 105 m (343 ft)

Population (2020)
  - Total: 26,187
  - Density: 8.1360/km^{2} (21.072/sq mi)
- Time zone: UTC-3 (UTC-3)
- HDI (2000): 0.657 – medium
- Website: www.independencia.ce.gov.br/

Independência is a municipality of the Northeastern state of Ceará in Brazil. It is the fourth largest by area in that state.
