= Diário do Nordeste =

Brazilian newspaper

- Compromisso com a verdade
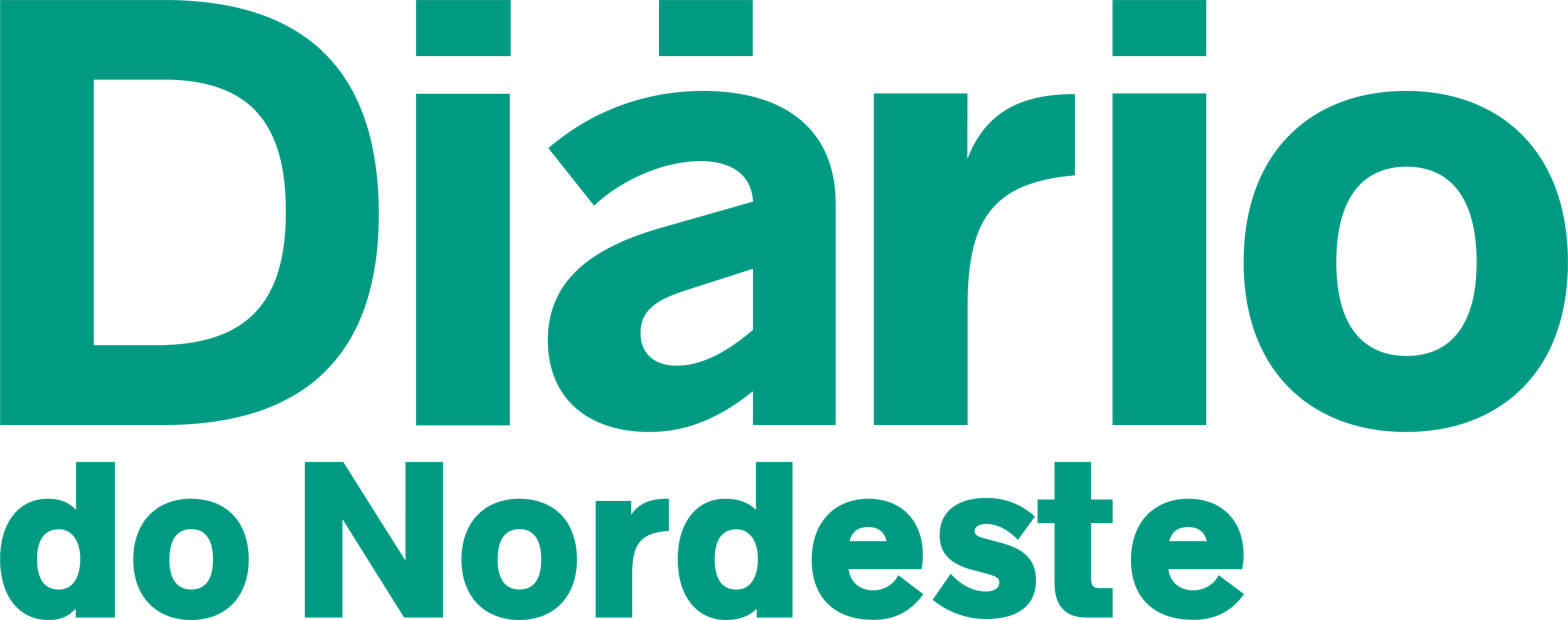
- Language: Portuguese
- Country: Brazil
- Website: diariodonordeste.verdesmares.com.br

Diário do Nordeste is a Brazilian newspaper published in Fortaleza, the capital of the Brazilian state of Ceará, it has been published since December 1981.
