= Parnaíba River =

Parnaíba
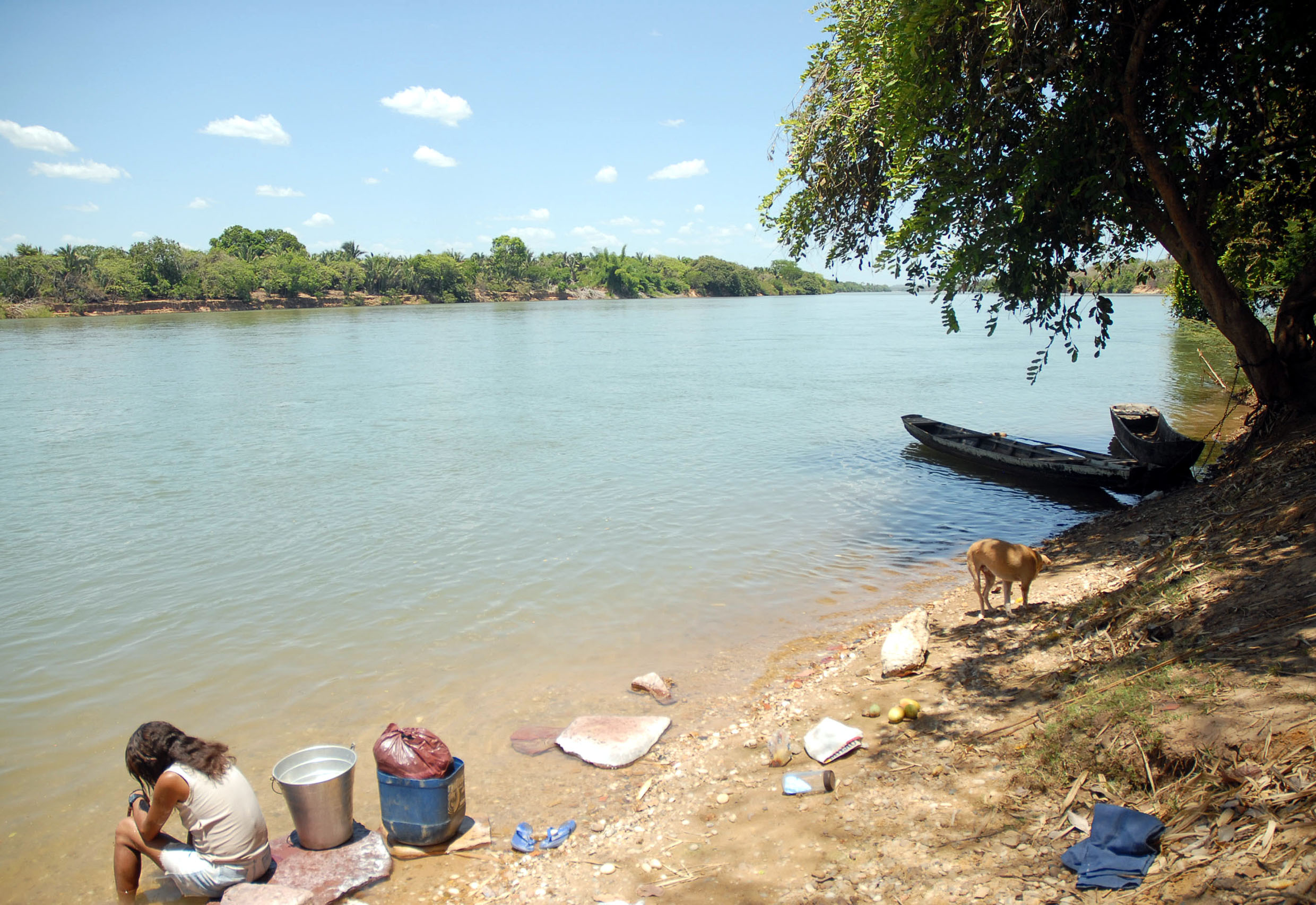
- Piauí side of Parnaíba River

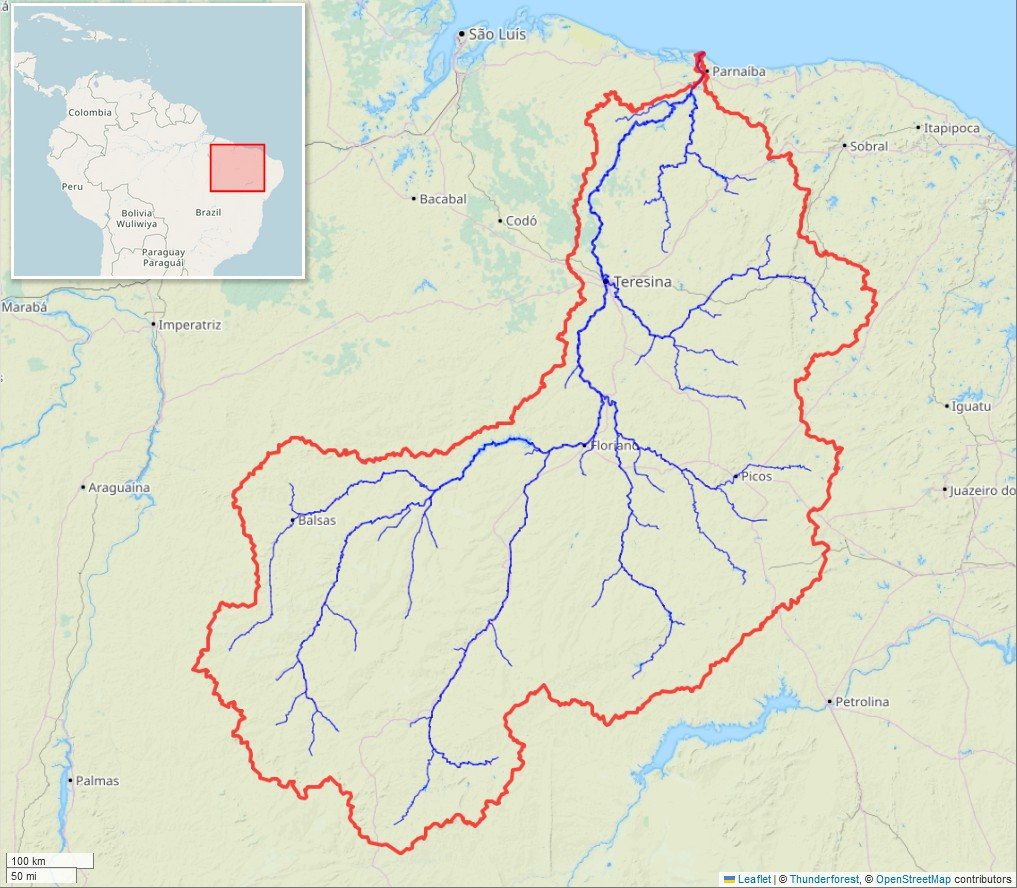
- Parnaíba River watershed (Interactive map)

Location
- Country: Brazil
- State: Piauí, Maranhão
- Region: Northeast

Physical characteristics
- Source: Áqua Quente
  - location: Barreiras do Piauí, Piauí
  - coordinates: 10°19′37″S 45°55′16″W
  - elevation: 786 m (2,579 ft)
- 2nd source: Rio das Lontras
  - location: Barreiras do Piauí, Piauí
  - coordinates: 10°08′28″S 45°43′16″W
  - elevation: 723 m (2,372 ft)
- Mouth: Atlantic Ocean
  - location: near Parnaíba (city), Maranhão / Piauí border
  - coordinates: 2°45′01″S 41°49′15″W
  - elevation: 0 m (0 ft)
- Length: 1,400 km (870 mi)
- Basin size: 344,112 km^{2} (132,862 sq mi)
- Discharge
  - average: 1,272 m^{3}/s (44,900 cu ft/s)

The Parnaíba River (Portuguese: Rio Parnaíba [paɾnaˈibɐ]) is a river in Brazil, which forms the border between the states of Maranhão and Piauí. Its main course is 1,400 km (870 mi) long and the Parnaíba River Basin covers 330,000 km^{2} (130,000 mi^{2}). The Parnaíba River rises in the Chapada das Mangabeiras range, and flows northeastward to empty into the Atlantic Ocean, being the longest river entirely located within Brazil's Northeast Region. The middle and upper regions of this river are separated by the Boa Esperança Hydroelectric Power Plant dam, but is otherwise navigable.

== Ecology ==
The fish species richness in the Parnaíba River Basin has traditionally been considered impoverished, but this has been disproven by recent surveys, which have recorded about 140 native species (including several that remain undescribed) and about 40% of these are endemic. One of the basin endemics is the freshwater stingray Potamotrygon signata. More than 70% of the fish species in the basin are members of either Characiformes or Siluriformes. The fauna in the headwaters has not yet been thoroughly surveyed. In addition to the natives, there are seven introduced fish species in the basin.

The river delta is protected by the 313,800 hectares (775,000 acres) Delta do Parnaíba Environmental Protection Area, created in 1996. The river's delta has large stands of mangrove, as well as dunes, beaches, marshes and other habitats. The delta is considered an Important Bird Area and is home to species such as scarlet ibis (Eudocimus ruber) and rufous crab hawk (Buteogallus aequinoctialis).

Two species of aquatic turtles are endemic to the general region, the Maranhão slider (Trachemys adiutrix) that is found in the delta and the side-necked turtles Mesoclemmys perplexa found inland, but neither is entirely restricted to the Parnaíba River Basin.
