= Piauí =

State of Brazil

- State
- Flag Coat of arms
- Motto: Impavidum Ferient Ruinae (Latin) "Wounded and undaunted amid the ruins"
- Anthem: Hino do Piauí
- Location in Brazil
- Coordinates: 8°14′S 43°6′W
- Country: Brazil
- Capital and largest city: Teresina

Government
  - Type: Unitary state
  - Governor: Rafael Fonteles (PT)
  - Vice Governor: Themístocles Filho (MDB)
  - Senators: Ciro Nogueira (PP); Jussara Lima (PSD); Marcelo Castro (MDB)
  - Legislature: Legislative Assembly of Piauí

Area
  - Total: 251,529.186 km^{2} (97,115.962 sq mi)
  - Rank: 11th

Population (2022)
  - Total: 3,271,199
  - Rank: 18th
  - Density: 13.00525/km^{2} (33.68343/sq mi)
  - Rank: 18th

GDP (2024)
  - Total: R$87.438 billion (US$16.225 billion)

HDI
  - Year: 2024
  - Category: 0.764 – high (19th)
- Time zone: UTC-3 (BRT)
- Postal Code: 64000/000 to 64990/000
- ISO 3166 code: BR-PI
- Website: www.pi.gov.br

Piauí (/pjaʊˈiː/, pyow-EE; pronounced [pi.aˈwi] or [pjaˈwi]) is one of the states of Brazil, located in the country's Northeast Region. The state has 1.6% of the Brazilian population and produces 0.7% of the Brazilian GDP.

Piauí has the shortest coastline of any coastal Brazilian state at 66 km (41 mi), and the capital, Teresina, is the only state capital in the northeast to be located inland. Unlike the rest of the area, Piauí was first colonised inland and slowly expanded towards the ocean, rather than the other way around. In the southeast of the state, the National Park of Serra da Capivara is a UNESCO World Heritage Site. The park has more than 400 archaeological sites and the largest concentration of rock paintings in the world, in a landscape dominated by canyons and caatinga.

== History ==
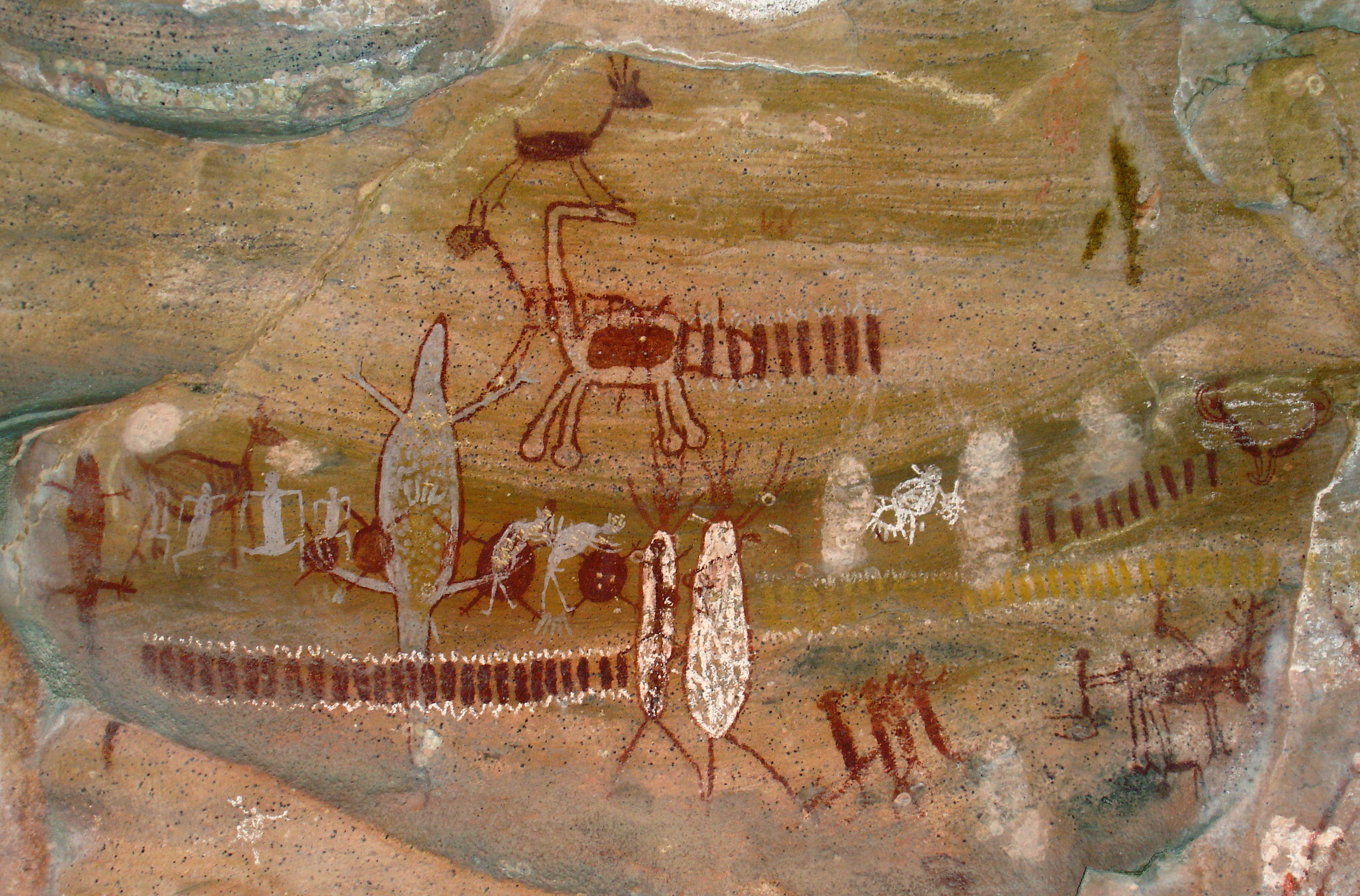
Rock art at Serra da Capivara National Park in Piauí state, one of the largest and oldest concentrations of prehistoric sites in the Americas

The state has many notable archaeological sites, including Serra de Capivara National Park and Sete Cidades National Park, which are rich in remains of prehistoric Paleo-Indian and sedentary-based Indigenous Brazilian complex cultures.

Early settlers in the region included Francisco Dias d'Ávila from state of Bahia, who brought the first herds of cattle to the area; and Domingos Afonso Mafrense, from Portugal, who founded what is today Oeiras.

In the 17th century, many impoverished noblemen and Jesuit priests, as well as black and Amerindian slaves, settled there. The first large-scale cattle farming also arrived with these settlers. Large estate owners seeking new pastures for their livestock arrived from neighbouring states such as Bahia and Maranhão.

At the beginning of the 20th century, the principal industry of the state was stock raising, which dates from the first settlement in 1674 by Domingos Afonso Mafrense, who established a number of cattle ranges. A secondary industry was the raising of goats, which were able to stand neglect and a scanty food supply. Agricultural products were cotton, sugar and tobacco. Forest products included rubber, carnauba wax and dyewoods. Exports included hides, skins, rubber, wax, tobacco and cotton.

Teresina was the first Brazilian city to be planned. In 1852, an architect designed it, after being inspired by a chessboard. Situated at the confluence of the Parnaíba and Poti Rivers, Teresina was (and still is) known as the Green City because of the countless mango trees that line the city's streets.

== Geography ==
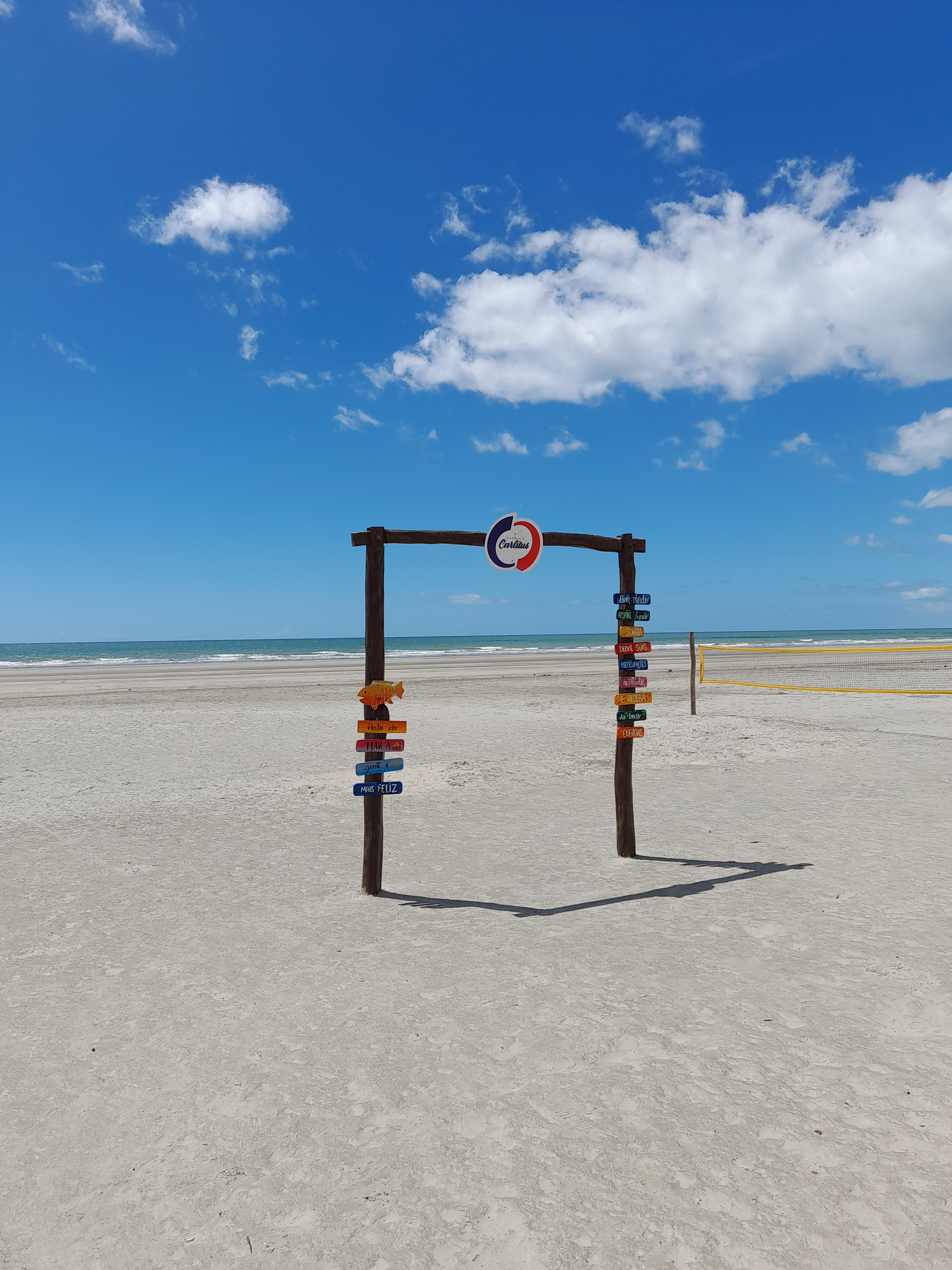
Luís Correia, Piauí

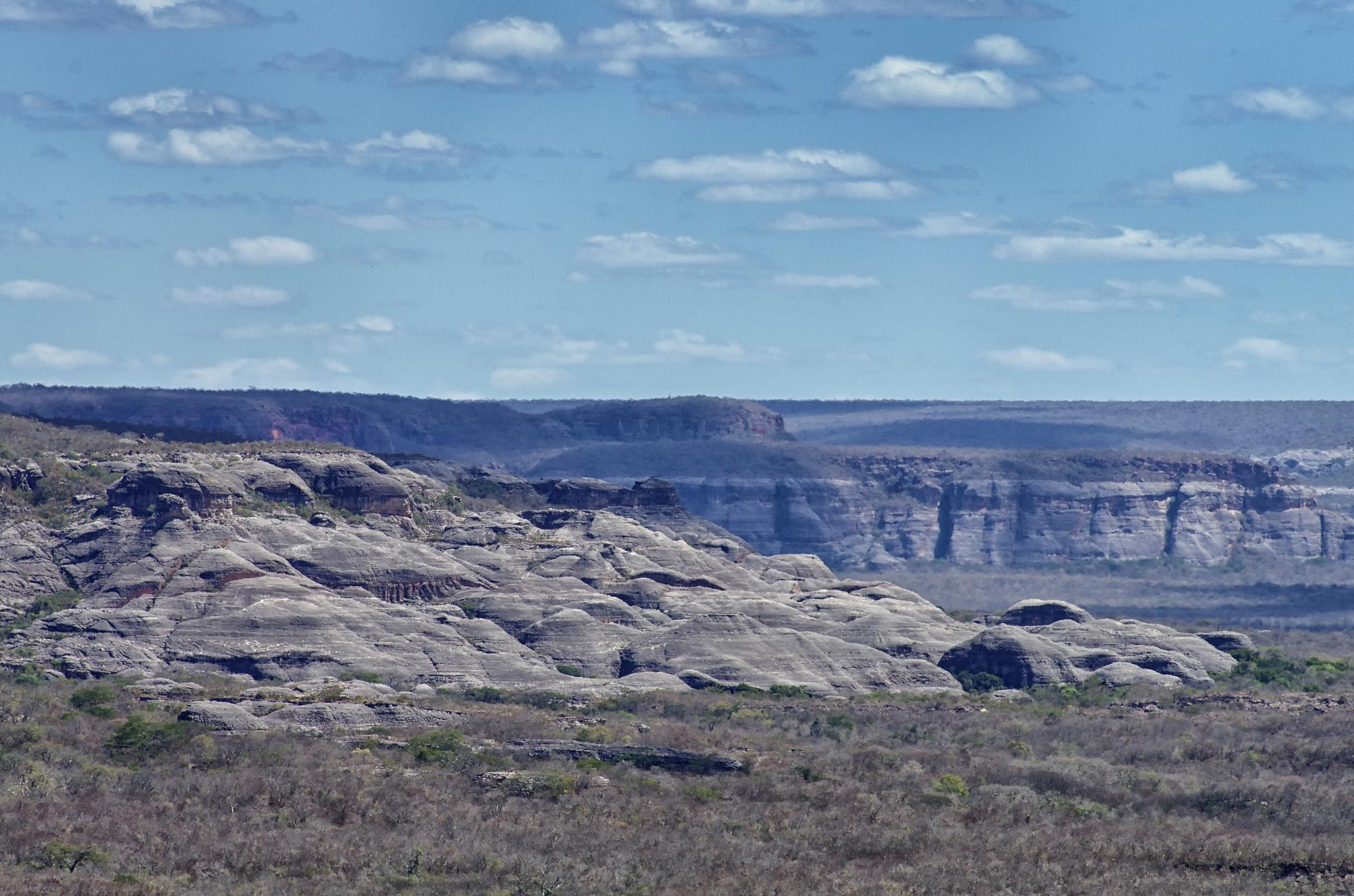
Serra das Confusões National Park

Piauí is bounded on the west by Maranhão, on the east by Ceará and Pernambuco, to the west by Tocantins, and to the south by Bahia. It has a short Atlantic coastline on the north.

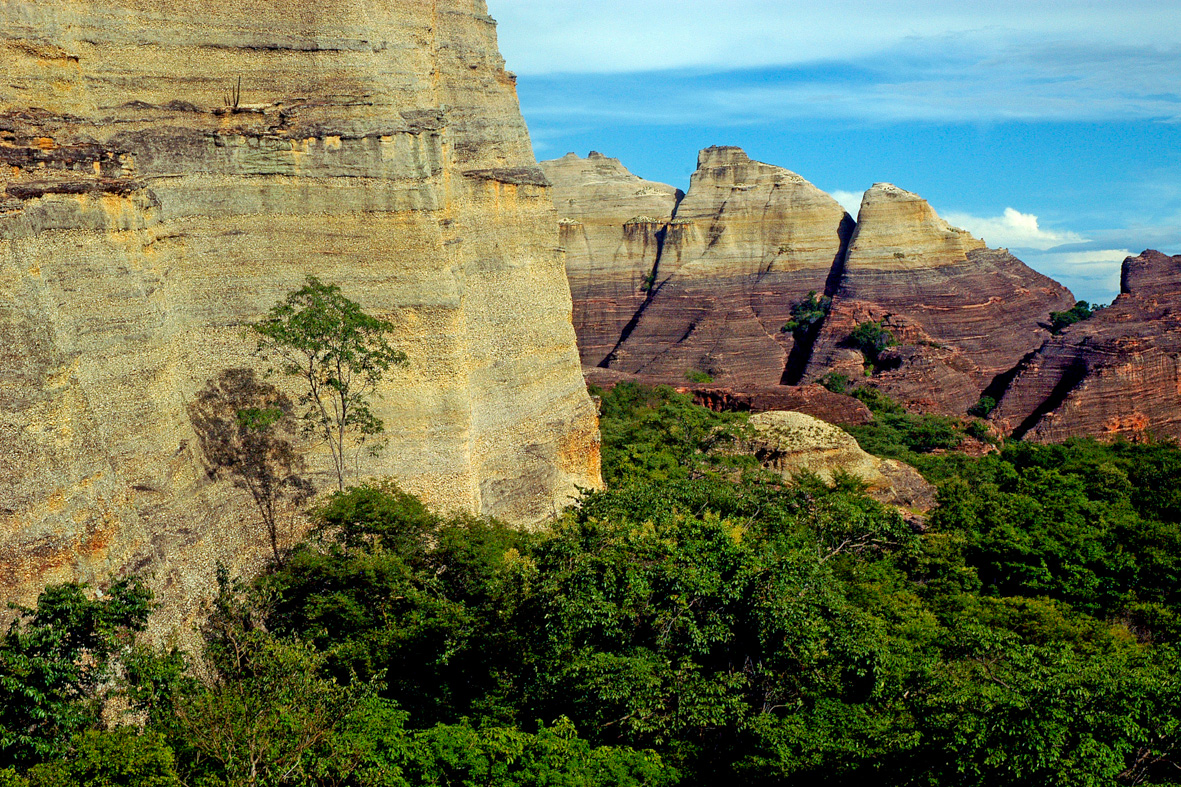
Caatinga

The Parnaíba River forms the boundary with Maranhão throughout its entire length; the state lies almost entirely within the basin of the Parnaíba and its tributaries. Part of the state on the Atlantic coast and along the lower Parnaíba is low, swampy, and historically malarial. South of this the country rises gradually to a plateau with open campos. This plateau region is watered by numerous tributaries of the Parnaíba, chief of which are, from south to north: the Poti, which has its source in the state of Ceará; the Longa; the Canindé and its tributary the Piauí, which is navigable for boats of one-meter draft up to Nova Iorque, a few miles above the mouth of the Gurguéia River. The river valleys are separated by flat-topped plateaus called chapadas, including the Serra Uruçui, which lies between the Uruçui-Preto and the Gurguéia, the Serra da Capivara National Park, which lies between the Gurguéia and the Piauí, and the Chapada das Mangabeiras, which forms the southwestern boundary of the state, separating the upper basin of the Parnaíba from that of the Tocantins.

=== Ecoregions ===
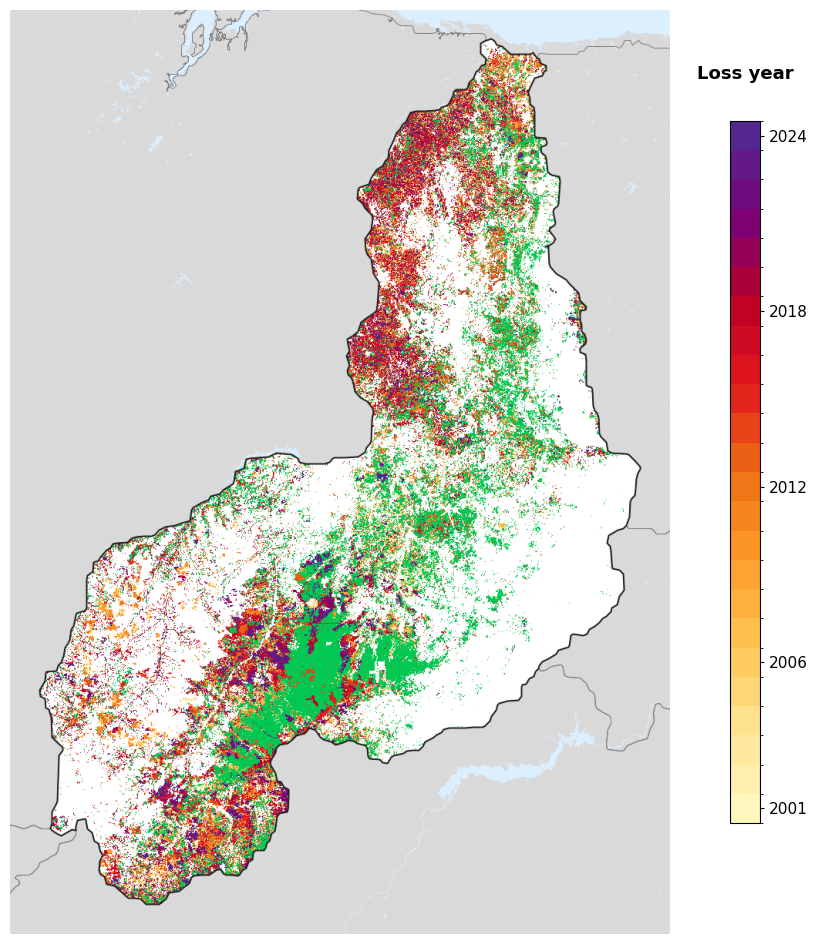
Tree-cover loss year in Piauí, 2001-2024, from the Global Forest Change dataset.

The sandy soils along the Atlantic coast are home to the Northeastern Brazil restingas, low evergreen forests adapted to the nutrient-poor conditions. The lower basin of the Parnaíba is home to the Maranhão Babaçu forests, which extend westward into Maranhão. This ecoregion is dominated by stands of the Babaçu palm.

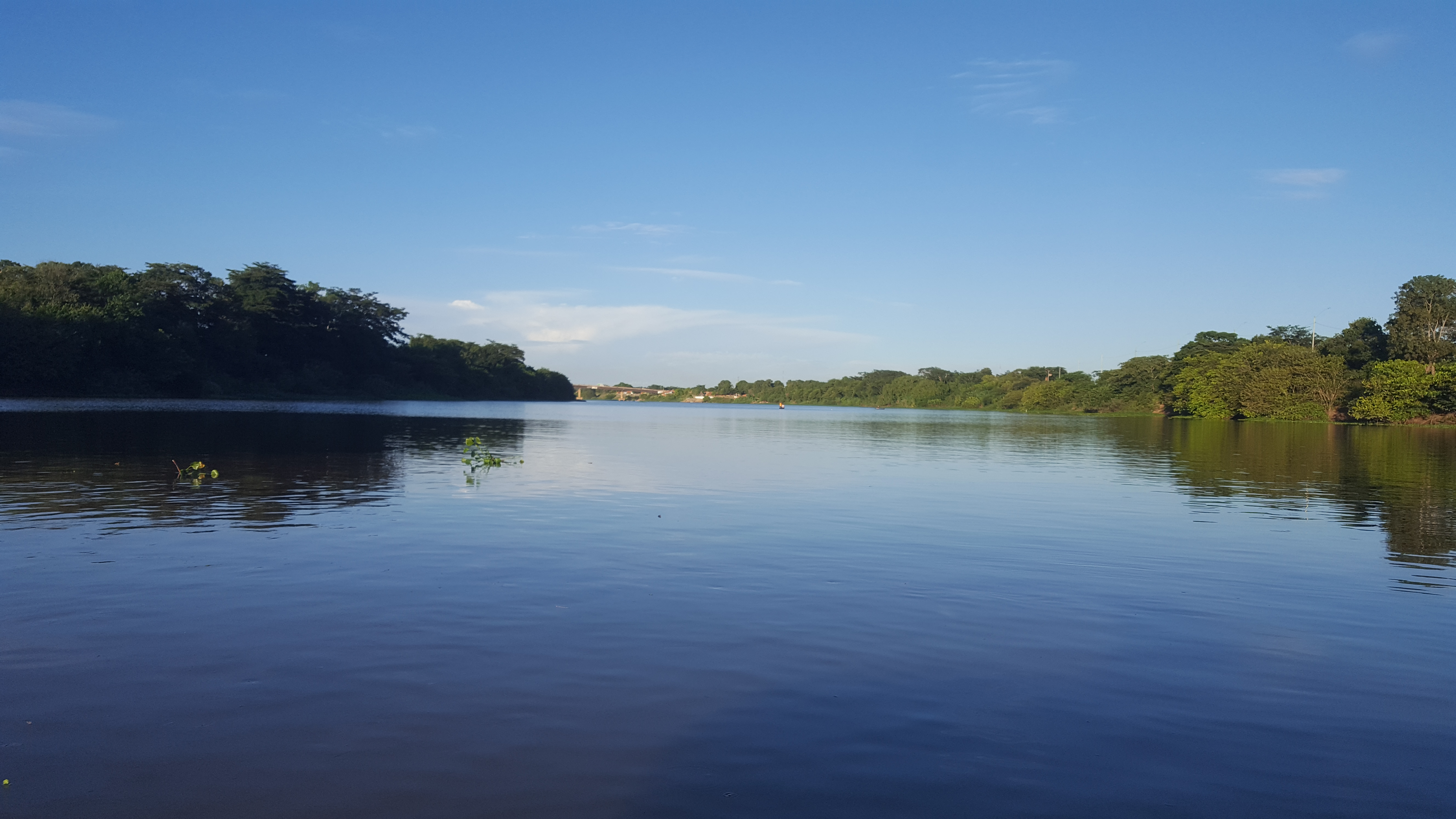
Parnaíba River in Piauí

The eastern portion of the state is dominated by the dry Caatingas shrublands, which extend across much of northeastern Brazil. The Cerrado savannas extend across the southwestern portion of the state, in the basins of the upper Parnaíba and Gurguéia rivers. Enclaves of Atlantic dry forests lie in basin of the Gurguéia, forming a transition between the Cerrado and Caatinga. Serra da Capivara National Park is located in the Caatinga of the south-central part of the state, and protects numerous caves with ancient cave paintings.

=== Climate ===
The climate is hot and humid in the lowlands and along the lower Parnaíba, but in the uplands it is dry with high day-time temperatures and cool nights.

== Demographics ==
Historical population
Year	Pop.	±%
1872	202,222	—
1890	267,609	+32.3%
1900	334,328	+24.9%
1920	609,003	+82.2%
1940	817,601	+34.3%
1950	1,045,696	+27.9%
1960	1,263,368	+20.8%
1970	1,734,894	+37.3%
1980	2,188,150	+26.1%
1991	2,581,215	+18.0%
2000	2,843,428	+10.2%
2010	3,118,360	+9.7%
2022	3,271,199	+4.9%

According to the 2022 census, there were 3,271,199 people residing in the state. The population density was 13 inhabitants/km^{2}.

Urbanization: 60.7% (2006); Population growth: 1.1% (1991–2000); Houses: 791,000 (2006).

The last census in 2022 revealed the following numbers: 2,120,880 Brown (Multiracial) people (64.8%), 740,322 White people (22.6%), 400,662 Black people (12.2%), 6,198 Amerindian people (0.2%), 3.078 Asian people (0.1%).

=== Largest cities ===
Largest cities or towns in Piauí (2011 census by the Brazilian Institute of Geography and Statistics)
Rank		Mesoregion	Pop.	Rank		Mesoregion	Pop.
1	Teresina	Centro-Norte	822363	11	Pedro II	Centro-Norte	37595
2	Parnaíba	Norte	146735	12	José de Freitas	Centro-Norte	37409
3	Picos	Sudeste	74966	13	Oeiras	Sudeste	35788
4	Piripiri	Norte	61963	14	Miguel Alves	Norte	32476
5	Floriano	Sudoeste	57928	15	São Raimundo Nonato	Sudoeste	32744
6	Campo Maior	Centro-Norte	45338	16	Luís Correia	Norte	28725
7	Barras	Norte	45154	17	Cocal	Norte	26922
8	União	Centro-Norte	42873	18	Piracuruca	Norte	27765
9	Altos	Centro-Norte	39030	19	Batalha	Norte	25900
10	Esperantina	Norte	38049	20	Corrente	Sudoeste	25574

=== Religion ===
Religion in Piauí (2010)
1. Catholicism (85.1%)
2. Protestantism (9.70%)
3. Spiritism (0.30%)
4. Other (2.50%)
5. No religion (3.40%)

The population of Piauí is mostly Christian. According to the IBGE, it is the state with the lowest proportion of Protestants, and the highest proportion of Catholics in the country. There is a great diversity of religious manifestations in Piauí, expressing the multicultural identity of the Piauí people. According to a survey conducted via an app developed by the Municipality of Teresina, there are more than 800 adherents of Afro-Brazilian religions in the capital. Considering that there are 800 thousand inhabitants in the municipality, there is practically one adherent for every thousand inhabitants. In addition to Christianity and other monotheistic religions, Piauí also has followers of polytheistic spiritualities, such as Piaganismo, who is considered the first neo-pagan religion created in Brazil.

=== Education ===
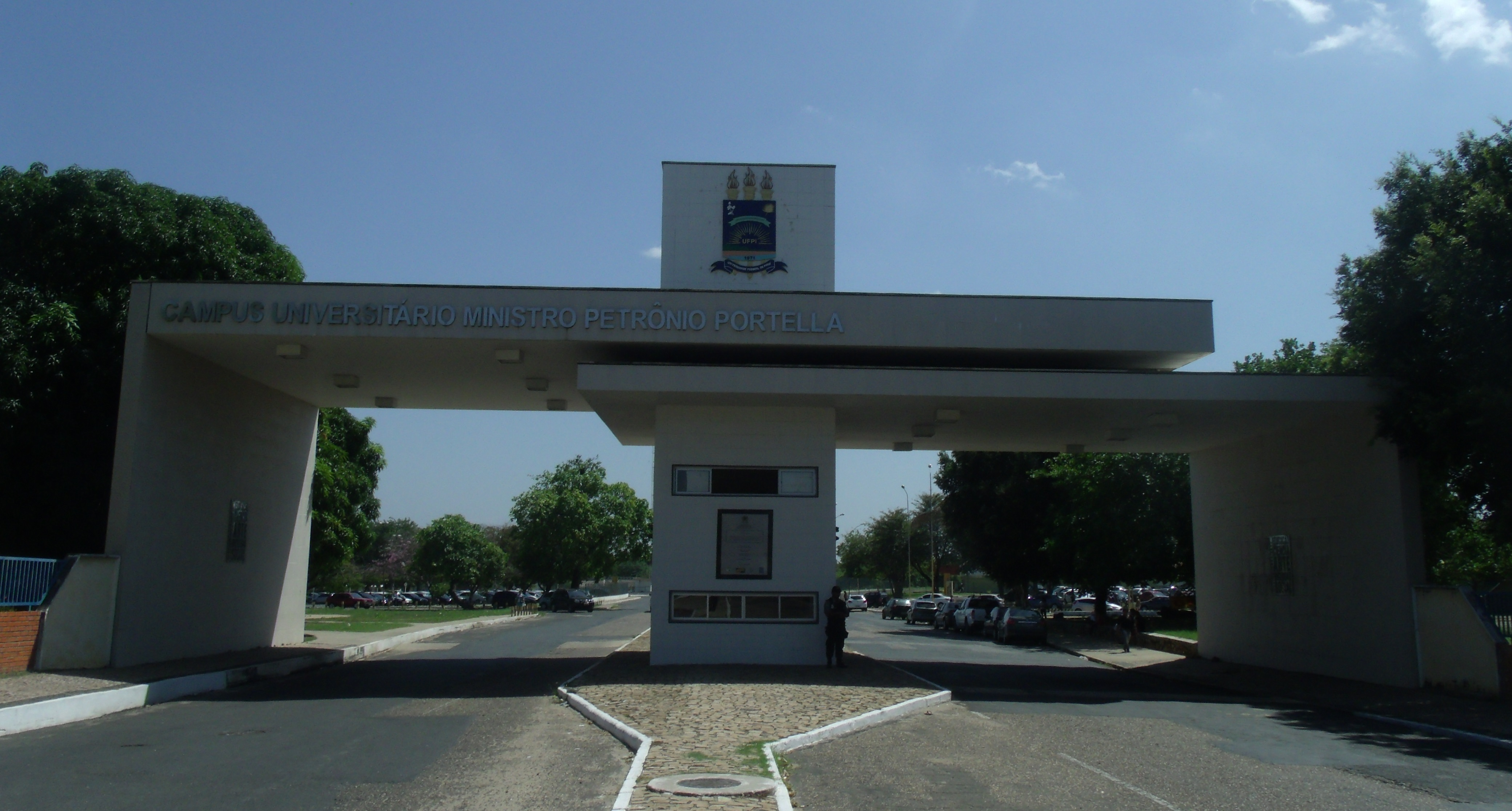
Federal University of Piauí entrance

Portuguese is the official national language, and thus the primary language taught in schools, but English and Spanish are part of the official high school curriculum.

==== Educational institutions ====
Educational institutions in Piauí include:

- Universidade Federal do Piauí (UFPI) (Federal University of Piauí)
- Universidade Federal do Vale do São Francisco (UNIVASF)
- Universidade Estadual do Piauí (Uespi) (State University of Piauí)
- Instituto Federal do Piauí (IFPI)
- Faculdade Santo Agostinho
- Centro de Ensino Superior do Vale do Parnaíba (Cesvale)
- Instituto de Ciências Jurídicas e Sociais Professor Camillo Filho
- Faculdade de Saúde, Ciências Humanas e Tecnológicas do Piauí
- Faculdade Integral Differencial (Facid)

== Economy ==
Piauí is one of the poorest states of Brazil. The service sector is the largest component of GDP at 60.1%, followed by the industrial sector at 27.3%. Agriculture represents 12.6% of GDP (2004). Piauí exports include essential oils 19.5%, soybeans 17.1%, woven cotton 15.1%, cashews 12.6%, crustaceans 12.4%, and leather 8.3% (2002).

Grupo Claudino is the largest industrial company with headquarters in the state. They have annual sales of around R$700 million.

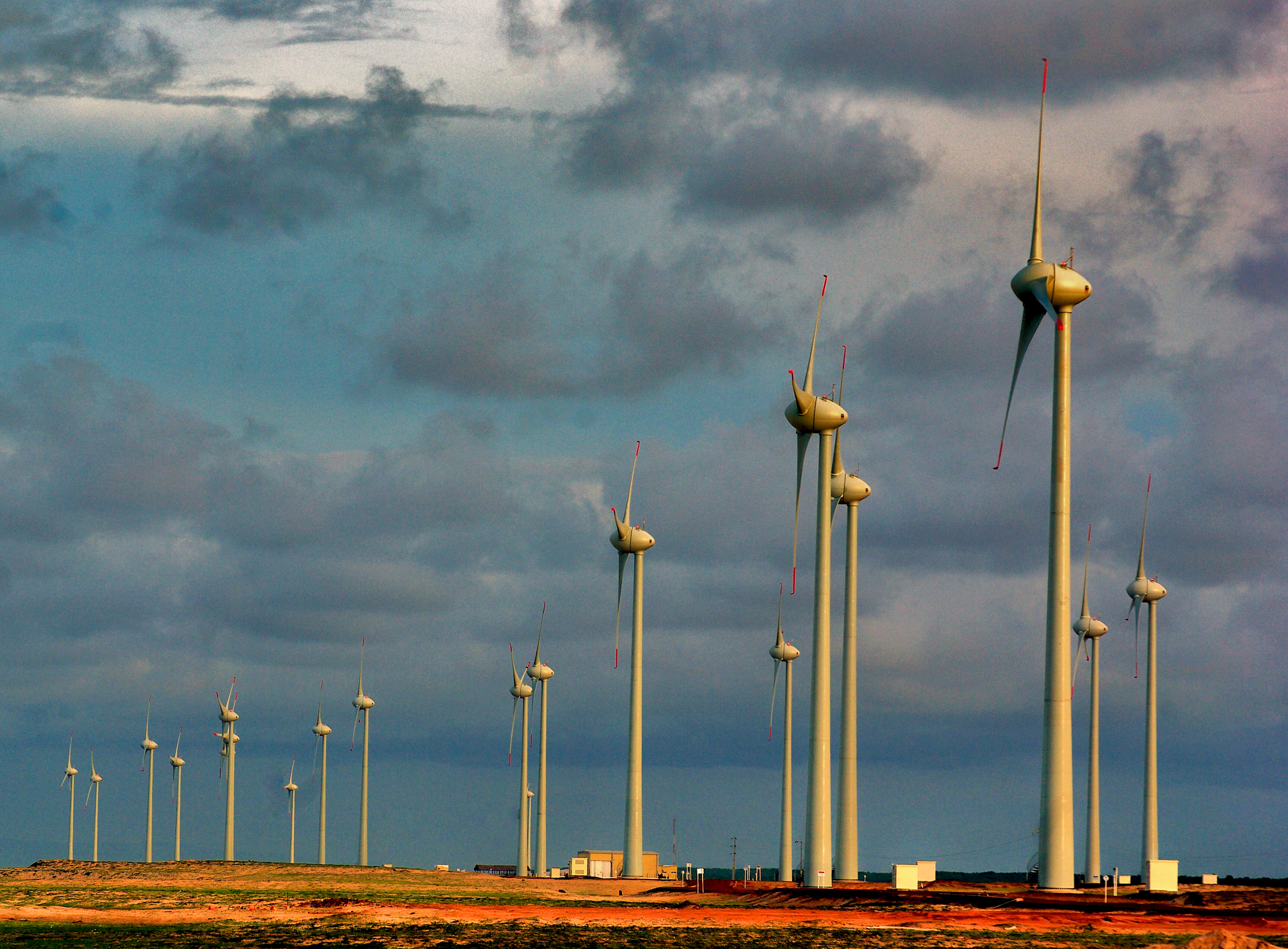
Wind farm in Parnaíba

Transfers from the Federal government are estimated to represent around a third of state GDP.

The state government has been involved in a number of initiatives to develop aspects of the state's economy. 10,000-18,000 hectares of land worth a reported R$50 million was given to Brasil Biodiesel, a green energy company. The company suffered a number of setbacks and in 2009 said it was selling the land. A second biodiesel company, Piauí Ecodiesel Ltda, is reported to be receiving up to R$81.1 million of investment.

The state has offered substantial tax benefits to agro-industrial companies. Bunge, Cargill and Algar now grow soy in the state. Suzano is to grow eucalyptus for pulp. These projects have been criticised by state environmental activists.

According to research commissioned by SETUR, the state tourism authority, over one million tourists would visit Piauí in 2010. Estimates based on by CEPRO, the state statistics agency, suggest the actual figure is likely to fractional of this figure. The construction of an international airport at São Raimundo Nonato (Aeroporto Internacional Serra da Capivara) was criticised on the grounds that it could not function as an international airport because the runway was too short and because ANAC (the Federal aviation authority) was not involved in monitoring the project, so were unable to certify it as safe for international flights.

There is some mining in the state, including South America's only opal mines at Pedro Segundo. Diamonds are mined by Gema do Piauí Mineração Ltda (Gemapi) and processed in the neighbouring state of Pernambuco in a joint-venture with Gitanjali Group (India). The state has significant deposits of nickel and iron ore. João Carlos Cavalcanti, a mining entrepreneur, and GME4 own the rights to the 800 million tonne PI4 iron ore deposit. A new railway bisecting the state may make this deposit economically viable.

Share of the Brazilian economy: 0.5% (2004).

== Culture ==
=== Festa Junina (Saint John Festival) ===
Festa Junina is a cultural festival inspired by Portuguese traditions, in which St John's day, on the June 24, is one of the oldest and most popular celebrations of the year. Unlike the European Midsummer's Day, the festivities in Brazil do not take place at the summer solstice but during the southern hemisphere's winter solstice. The festivities traditionally begin after the 12th of June, on the eve of St Anthony's day, and last until the 29th, which is St Peter's day. During these fifteen days, there are bonfires, fireworks, and folk dancing in the streets (step names are in French, which shows the mutual influences between court life and peasant culture in the 17th, 18th, and 19th-century Europe). Once exclusively a rural festival, today in Brazil it is largely a city festival during which people mimic peasant stereotypes and clichés and consume typical refreshments and dishes. As in Carnival, these festivities involve costumes (in this case, peasant garb), dancing, heavy drinking, and visual spectacles (fireworks display and folk dancing). As on Midsummer and St John's Day in Europe, bonfires are a central part of the festivities.

=== Carnival ===
The four-day period before Lent leading up to Ash Wednesday is carnival time in Brazil.

== Infrastructure ==
=== National Airport ===
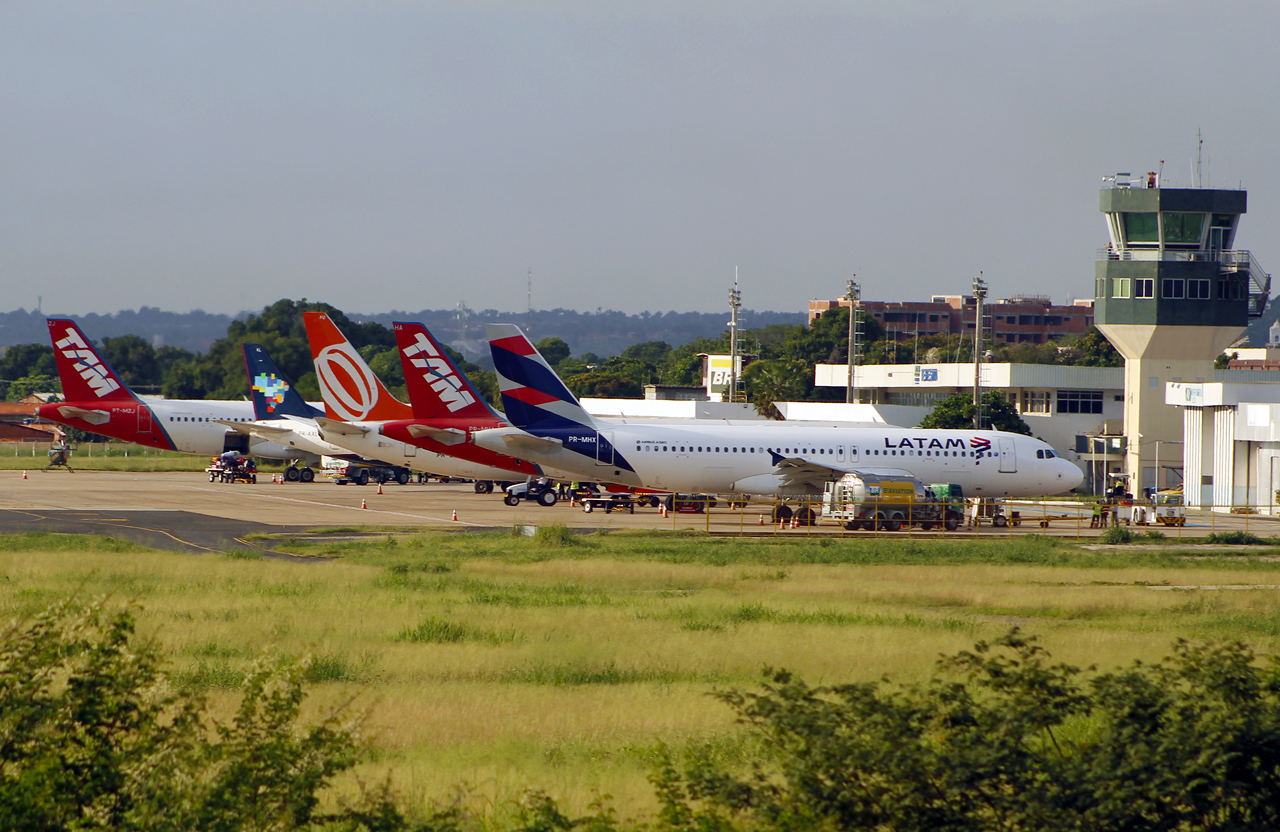
Teresina Airport

Teresina/Senador Petrônio Portella Airport is located four kilometers (2.5 mi) from downtown Teresina. Opened in 1967, it has been administered by Infraero since 1975. There are no international flights to this airport.

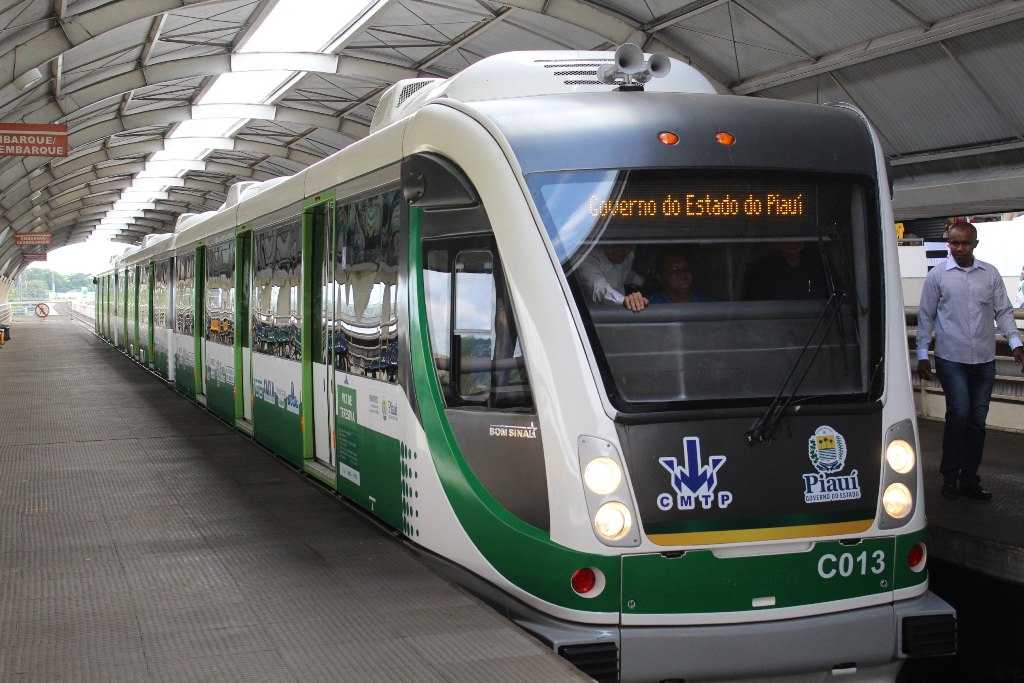
Teresina Metro system

=== Highways ===
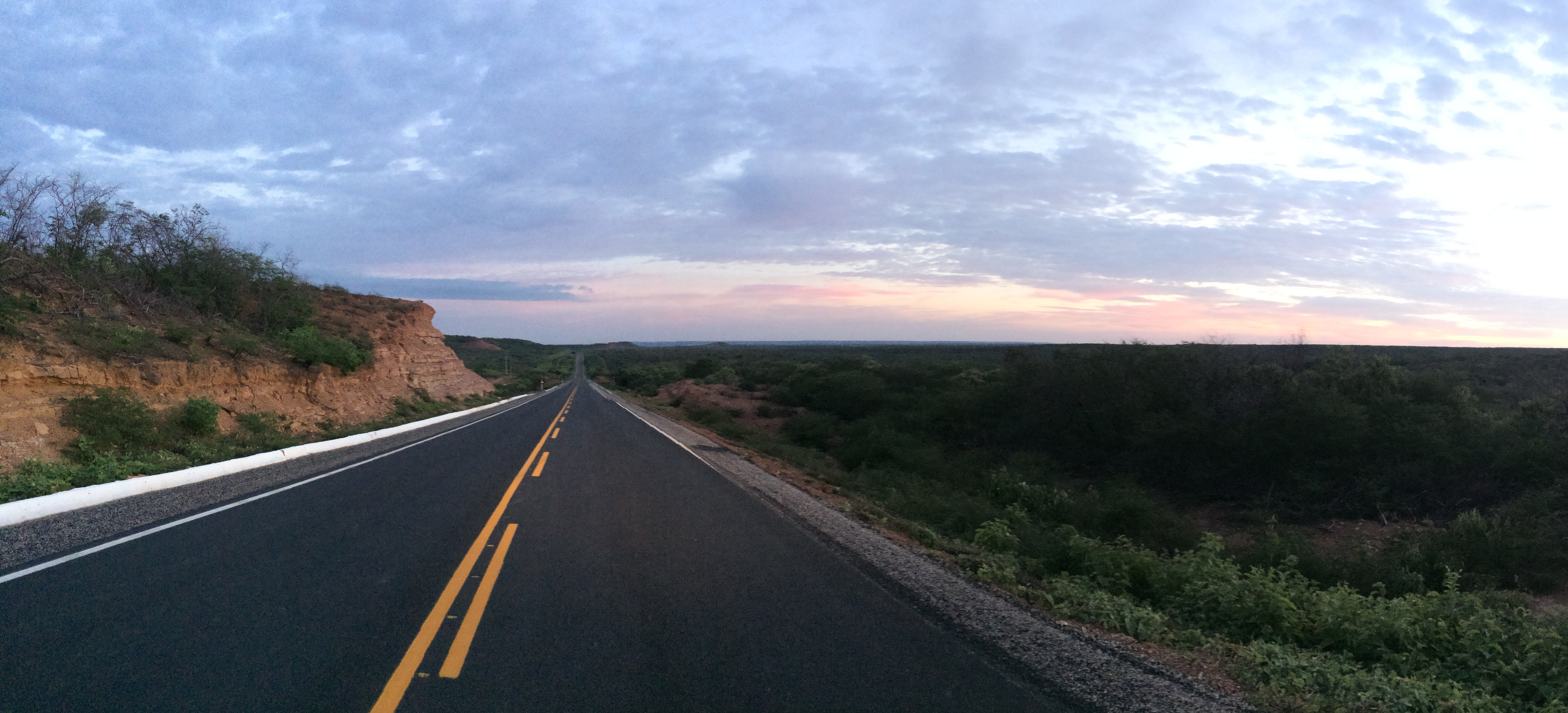
BR-324 Highway across Serra da Capivara National Park

- BR-020
- BR-135
- BR-222
- BR-226
- BR-230
- BR-235
- BR-316
- BR-324
- BR-330
- BR-343
- BR-402
- BR-404
- BR-407

== Flag ==
The flag of Piauí was unveiled on 24 July 1922. The blue canton and a star represents the state itself and the green and yellow bars represent Piauí's union with Brazil. In 2005 the words "13 DE MARÇO DE 1823" were added below the star to commemorate the date of the Battle of Jenipapo, an engagement in Brazil's war of independence.

== Cities ==
The state is divided into 224 municipalities.

Some cities in Piauí include:

- Teresina
- Parnaíba
- Picos
- Oeiras
- Avelino Lopes
- Curimata

== See also ==
- USS Lewis Hancock
- Ceará-Piauí border dispute
