= Parotocinclus adamanteus =

Scientific classification
- Kingdom: Animalia
- Phylum: Chordata
- Class: Actinopterygii
- Order: Siluriformes
- Family: Loricariidae
- Genus: Parotocinclus
- Species: P. adamanteus

Binomial name
- Parotocinclus adamanteus E. H. L. Pereira, A. Santos, de Pinna & Reis, 2019

Species of catfish

Parotocinclus adamanteus is a species of freshwater ray-finned fish belonging to the family Loricariidae, the suckermouth armoured catfishes, and the subfamily Hypoptopomatinae, the cascudinhos. This catfish is endemic to Brazil.

== Taxonomy ==
Parotocinclus adamanteus was first formally described in 2019 ny the Brazilian ichthyologists Edson Henrique Lopes Pereira, Alexandre Clistenes de A. Santos, Mário C. C. de Pinna and Roberto Esser dos Reis with its type locality givens as the Roncador, a tributary of the Rio São José at Cachoeira Sonrisal, Roncador Farm on road from Lençóis to Andaraí, Paraguaçu River basin at 12°42'05"S, 41°21'40"W from an elevation of 389 m (1,276 ft), in the Brazilian state of Bahia. Eschmeyer's Catalog of Fishes classifies the genus Parotocinclus in the subfamily Hypoptopomatinae, the cascudinhos, within the suckermouth armored catfish family Loricariidae. Phylogenetic analysis indicates that this species is most closely related to P. jequi, P. prata, and P. robustus.

== Etymology ==
Parotocinclus adamanteus is classified in the genus Parotocinclus, is a combination of para, meaning "near", and the genus Otocinclus, the genus the type species, P. maculicauda was originally thought to be a member of. The specific name, adamanteus, means "of the diamond" and refers to the Chapada Diamantina, a large plateau in central Bahia.

== Description ==
Parotocinclus adamanteus is told apart from all other species in its genus by having a fleshy swelling which creates a distinct border to the snout, this is decorated with moderately hypertrophied odontodes in the adult males. The pectoral fin in males has branched rays which decrease in size, forming a pointed rear edge to the fin. In addition, P. adamanteus can be also be told apart from other species in teh genus by the absence of a plate on the snout and by the absence of abdominal plates on the underside, a high number of teeth on the premaxilla, and by the possession of a short and centrally expanded lower part of the cheek canal plate. This species reaches a standard length of 65 mm (2.6 in).

== Distribution and habitat ==
Parotocinclus adamanteus is endemic to Brazil where it occurs in the Paraguaçu River basin in the state of Bahia in 5 creeks in the drainage basin of the São José River in the municipalities of Lençóis and Andaraí. It is found in rocky areas with strong currents.
