= Parotocinclus nandae =

Scientific classification
- Kingdom: Animalia
- Phylum: Chordata
- Class: Actinopterygii
- Order: Siluriformes
- Family: Loricariidae
- Genus: Parotocinclus
- Species: P. nandae

Binomial name
- Parotocinclus nandae Lehmann A., Camelier & Zanata, 2020

Species of catfish

Parotocinclus nandae is a species of freshwater ray-finned fish belonging to the family Loricariidae, the suckermouth armoured catfishes, and the subfamily Hypoptopomatinae, the cascudinhos. This catfish is endemic to Brazil.

== Taxonomy ==
Parotocinclus nandae was first formally described in 2020 by the Brazilian ichthyologists Pablo César Lehmann Albornoz, Priscila Camelier and Angela M. Zanata with its type locality given as the Upper Paraguaçu River, under bridge on highway BA-142, between Ibicoara and Barra da Estiva, 9 km (5.6 mi) from Ibicoara, at 13°26'10.32"S, 41°20'19.14"W, where the elevation was 1,068 m (3,504 ft), in the Brazilian state of Bahia. Eschmeyer's Catalog of Fishes classifies the genus Parotocinclus in the subfamily Hypoptopomatinae, the cascudinhos, within the suckermouth armored catfish family Loricariidae.

== Etymology ==
Parotocinclus nandae is classified in the genus Parotocinclus, is a combination of para, meaning "near", and the genus Otocinclus, the genus the type species, P. maculicauda was originally thought to be a member of. The specific name, nandae, honours Maria Fernanda Boaz Lehmann, the daughter of the Lehmann A, she is affectionately known as "Nanda".

== Description ==
Parotocinclus nandae is distinguished by its congeners by its unique color pattern and differences in several morphological characteristics. The species reaches at least 4.62 cm (1.8 inches) SL. Females of this species are noted to have thick and rough skin in the interradial membrane of the pelvic fin, a trait which has not been reported from any other member of the order Siluriformes.

== Distribution ==
Parotocinclus nandae is endemicto Brazil where it is known to occur at two localities in the Paraguaçu River in the Chapada Diamantina region of the state of Bahia. The type series were collected from a small stream with clear water which alternated between alternating stretches of fast amd slow. The streamside vegetation was largely made up of shrubs and trees. The specimens were taken from the fast current sections of the stream, in a stretch roughly 2 to 4 m (6 ft 7 in to 13 ft 1 in) wide with a depth between 0.3 and 1.0 m (1 ft 0 in and 3 ft 3 in), where the streambed was made up of pebbles and organic debris with a abundant subaquatic vegetation.
