= P. cearensis =

P. cearensis may refer to:

- Parotocinclus cearensis, an armored catfish
- Phyllosticta cearensis, a sac fungus
- Pleurothallis cearensis, a neotropical orchid
