= Parotocinclus muriaensis =

Conservation status
- Data Deficient (IUCN 3.1)

Scientific classification
- Kingdom: Animalia
- Phylum: Chordata
- Class: Actinopterygii
- Order: Siluriformes
- Family: Loricariidae
- Genus: Parotocinclus
- Species: P. muriaensis

Binomial name
- Parotocinclus muriaensis Gauger & Buckup, 2005

Species of fish

Parotocinclus muriaensis is a species of freshwater ray-finned fish belonging to the family Loricariidae, the suckermouth armoured catfishes, and the subfamily Hypoptopomatinae, the cascudinhos. This catfish is endemic to Brazil.

== Taxonomy ==
Parotocinclus muriaensis was first formally described in 2005 by the Brazilian ichthyologists Marco F. W. Gauger and Paulo Andreas Buckup with its type locality given as the Muriaé River, near intersection of highways BR-356 and RJ-186, 20 km (12 mi) downstream from Itaperuna, about 21°15'S, 41°45'S in the municipality of Itaperuna in the Brazilian state of Rio de Janeiro. Eschmeyer's Catalog of Fishes classifies the genus Parotocinclus in the subfamily Hypoptopomatinae, the cascudinhos, within the suckermouth armored catfish family Loricariidae.

== Etymology ==
Parotocinclus muriaensis is classified in the genus Parotocinclus, is a combination of para, meaning "near", and the genus Otocinclus, the genus the type species, P. maculicauda was originally thought to be a member of. The specific name, muriaensis, adds the suffix -ensis meaning "of a place" on to Muriaé, the name of the river in the Paraíba do Sul drainage system which is the type localty of this species.

== Description ==
Parotocinclus muriaensis has an additional patch of single cusped teeth. The complete absence odf an adipose fin is a character that separates this species and P. bidentatus from almost all others species in their genus.This species reaches a standard length of 3.1 cm (1.2 in).

== Distribution ==
Parotocinclus muriaensis is endemic to Brazil where it is known only from its type series, of four specimens, which was collected from the Muriaé River, in the catchment of the Paraíba do Sul in the state of Rio de Janeiro.

== Conservation status ==
Parotocinclus muriaensis is only known from its type series and the lack of information abouts its biology, distribution, population and any threats have led the International Union for Conservation of Nature to classify this species as Data Deficient.
