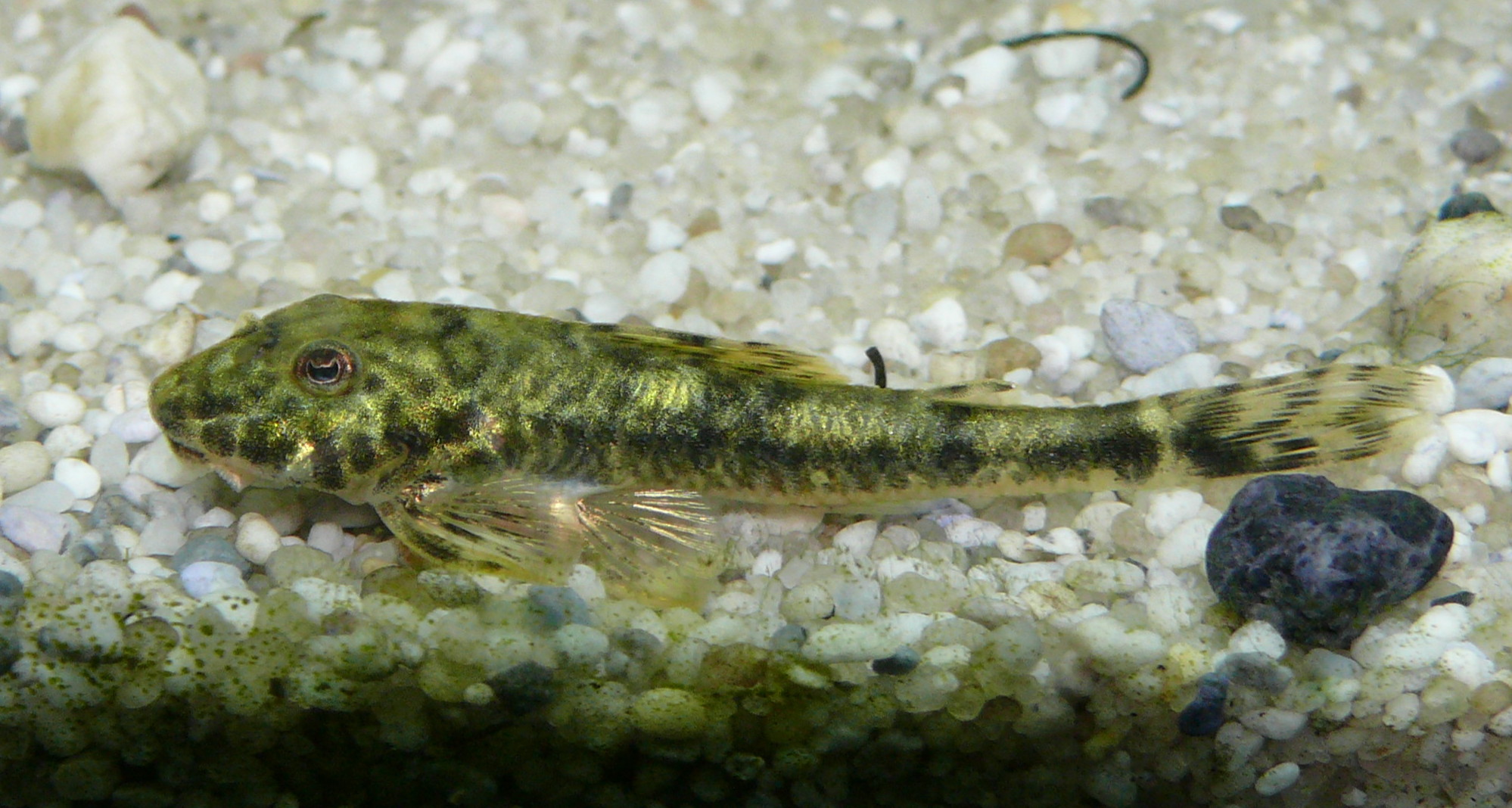

Conservation status
- Least Concern (IUCN 3.1)

Scientific classification
- Kingdom: Animalia
- Phylum: Chordata
- Class: Actinopterygii
- Order: Siluriformes
- Family: Loricariidae
- Genus: Parotocinclus
- Species: P. jumbo

Binomial name
- Parotocinclus jumbo Britski & Garavello, 2002

= Parotocinclus jumbo =

Species of fish

Parotocinclus jumbo is a species of freshwater ray-finned fish belonging to the family Loricariidae, the suckermouth armoured catfishes, and the subfamily Hypoptopomatinae, the cascudinhos. This catfish is endemic to Brazil.

== Taxonomy ==
Parotocinclus jumbo was first formally described in 2002 by the Brazilian ichthyologists Heraldo A. Britski and Julio C. Garavello with its type locality given as the Paraíba do Norte River, at bridge on road PB 408, northwest of Umbuzeiro, at 7°38'27"S, 35°42'30"W, in the Brazilian state of Paraíba. Eschmeyer's Catalog of Fishes classifies the genus Parotocinclus in the subfamily Hypoptopomatinae, the cascudinhos, within the suckermouth armoured catfish family Loricariidae.

== Etymology ==
Parotocinclus jumbo is classified in the genus Parotocinclus, is a combination of para, meaning "near", and the genus Otocinclus, the genus the type species, P. maculicauda was originally thought to be a member of. The specific name, jumbo, means large and is derived from the name of an African bush elephant called Jumbo, which P. T. Barnum bought from London Zoo and imported into the United States in 1882. This species is larger in size than most of the species in its genus.

== Description ==
Parotocinclus jumbo has an elongated body and it reaches a total length of 4 cm (1.6 in). It has 8 soft rays in its dorsal fin and 6 in its anal fin. The odontodes on the snout of this catfish are almost as wide as they are long and have heart-shaped tips.

== Distribution ==
Parotocinclus jumbo is endemic to Brazil where it occurs in the coastal rivers of the states of Ceará, Paraíba, Pernambuco and Alagoas. This species is found in slow-moving, clear watercourses in flat, shallow areas with sandy and rocky bottoms.
