= Gruta da Torrinha =

Cave localized on the state of Bahia

Coordinates: 12°34′59″S 41°59′38″W

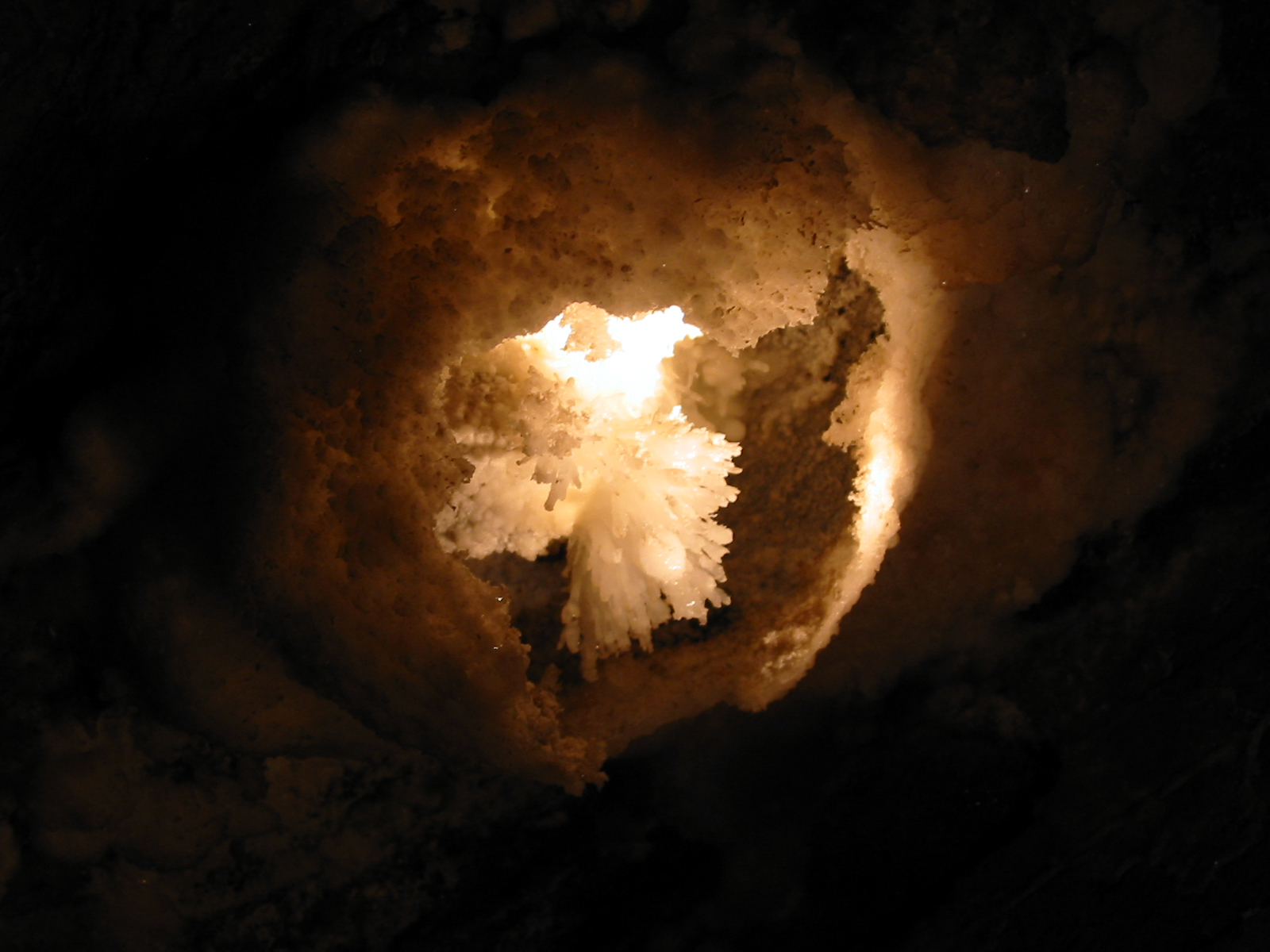
An uncommon speleothem formed by a flower of aragonite enclosed by a bubble of calcite located inside Caverna da Torrinha.

Caverna Torrinha (BA-037) is a cave located in the village of Torrinha, 15 km from the town of Iraquara and 1 km of the highway BA-122, inside of the Área de Proteção Ambiental Marimbus-Iraquara (north of the Chapada Diamantina National Park), in the State of Bahia, Brazil. It is considered the most beautiful cave within the area of the state, having the second largest flower of aragonite in the world.

== Geology ==
The first part of the topographic mapping (600m) was made in 1992 by Meanders Speleological Group, from France. The cave was discovered in 1850 and has three routes open to tourist visits with one of them that can be covered within 3 hours. Today there are only 14.000 meters mapped. The tourism industry has become the main source of income for the administrator of the local people and neighbors. It is the most complete cave for presenting rare cave formationss as helictites, needles of gypsum that look like glass and subterranean lakes.

== See also ==
- List of caves in Brazil
- Chapada Diamantina
