= Parotocinclus jacumirim =

Scientific classification
- Kingdom: Animalia
- Phylum: Chordata
- Class: Actinopterygii
- Order: Siluriformes
- Family: Loricariidae
- Genus: Parotocinclus
- Species: P. jacumirim

Binomial name
- Parotocinclus jacumirim Silva-Junior, T. P. A. Ramos & A. M. Zanata, 2020

Species of fish

Parotocinclus jacumirim is a species of freshwater ray-finned fish belonging to the family Loricariidae, the suckermouth armoured catfishes, and the subfamily Hypoptopomatinae, the cascudinhos. This catfish is endemic to Brazil.

== Taxonomy ==
Parotocinclus jacumirim was first formally described in 2020 by the Brazilian ichthyologists Dario Ernesto Silva-Junior, Telton Pedro Anselmo Ramos and Angela M. Zanata with its type locality given as the Jacumirim River, a tributary of the Jacuípe River, on the road BA-093 between municipalities of Dias d'Ávila and Mata de São João, Dias d’Ávila, in the Brazilian state of Bahia at 12°34'59.3"S, 38°18'59.6"W. Eschmeyer's Catalog of Fishes classifies the genus Parotocinclus in the subfamily Hypoptopomatinae, the cascudinhos, within the suckermouth armoured catfish family Loricariidae.

== Etymology ==
Parotocinclus jacumirim is classified in the genus Parotocinclus, is a combination of para, meaning "near", and the genus Otocinclus, the genus the type species, P. maculicauda was originally thought to be a member of. The specific name, jacumirim, is the name of the river in which the only known populations of this species are found. The river's name combines the Tupi words jacús, a species of bird, and mirim, meaning "small".

== Description ==
Parotocinclus jacimirim reaches a total length of 4 cm (1.6 in). This species can be told apart from other species in its genus by the reduction of the adipose fin to an adipose spine. It also does not have additioonal patches of unicuspid teeth, wide naked areas on the underside and the tip of the snoutis wholly covered by plates and odontodes.

== Distribution ==
Parotocinclus haroldoi is endemic to Brazil where it occurs in the Jacuípe River Basin in Bahia. This species is found in rivers with a moderate current in the vegetation zones known as the Cerrado and Caatinga. The stream the type series was collected from was 1 m (3 ft 3 in) wide, with a depth between a few centimetres and a metre, with a stream bed consisting of pebbles, sand and detritus and the marginal vegetation is made up of dense grasses, and sparse trees and palms.
