= Parotocinclus minutus =

Conservation status
- Least Concern (IUCN 3.1)

Scientific classification
- Kingdom: Animalia
- Phylum: Chordata
- Class: Actinopterygii
- Order: Siluriformes
- Family: Loricariidae
- Genus: Parotocinclus
- Species: P. minutus

Binomial name
- Parotocinclus minutus Garavello, 1977

Species of fish

Parotocinclus minutus is a species of freshwater ray-finned fish belonging to the family Loricariidae, the suckermouth armoured catfishes, and the subfamily Hypoptopomatinae, the cascudinhos. This catfish is endemic to Brazil.

== Taxonomy ==
Parotocinclus minutus was first formally described in 1977 by the Brazilian ichthyologist Julio C. Garavello with its type locality given as the Vaza-Barris River, Canudos in the Brazilian state of Bahia. Eschmeyer's Catalog of Fishes classifies the genus Parotocinclus in the subfamily Hypoptopomatinae, the cascudinhos, within the suckermouth armoured catfish family Loricariidae.

== Etymology ==
Parotocinclus minutus is classified in the genus Parotocinclus, is a combination of para, meaning "near", and the genus Otocinclus, the genus the type species, P. maculicauda was originally thought to be a member of. The specific name, minutus, means "very small" and is a reference to the small size of this species.

== Description ==
Parotocinclus minutus has 21 or 22 plates along the lateral line with a single row of elongated plates along the sides of the abdomen with another row in the middle. There is a group of plates to the front of the anal fin. There are 21 or 22 teeth on the premaxilla and between 17 and 19 on the dentary. This species reaches a standard length 3.3 cm (1.3 in).

== Distribution ==
Parotocinclus minutus is endemic to Brazil where it is known only from the Vasa-Barris River basin in the state of Bahia.

== Conservation status ==
Parotocinclus minutus is classified as Least Concern by the International Union for Conservation of Nature because despite having little information about its population, biology and ecology because they have been unable to identify threats to its population.
