= Parotocinclus arandai =

Conservation status
- Least Concern (IUCN 3.1)

Scientific classification
- Kingdom: Animalia
- Phylum: Chordata
- Class: Actinopterygii
- Order: Siluriformes
- Family: Loricariidae
- Genus: Parotocinclus
- Species: P. arandai

Binomial name
- Parotocinclus arandai Sarmento-Soares, Lehmann A. & Martins-Pinheiro, 2009

Species of fish

Parotocinclus arandai is a species of freshwater ray-finned fish belonging to the family Loricariidae, the suckermouth armoured catfishes, and the subfamily Hypoptopomatinae, the cascudinhos. This catfish is endemic to Brazil.

== Taxonomy ==
Parotocinclus arandai was first formally described in 2009 by the Brazilian ichthyologists Luisa Maria Sarmento-Soares, Pablo César Lehmann Albornoz & Ronaldo Fernando Martins-Pinheiro with its type locality given as the Bananeiras stream on road between Geribá and Palmópolis at 16°44'48"S, 40°25'46"W, in the municipality of Palmópolis, Minas Gerais. Eschmeyer's Catalog of Fishes classifies the genus Parotocinclus in the subfamily Hypoptopomatinae, the cascudinhos, within the suckermouth armored catfish family Loricariidae.

== Etymology ==
Parotocinclus arandai is classified in the genus Parotocinclus, is a combination of para, meaning "near", and the genus Otocinclus, the genus the type species, P. maculicauda was originally thought to be a member of. The specific name, honours the Brazilian ichthyologist and colleague of the authors Arion Túlio Aranda, who assisted in the collection of the type series but also in recognition of his talent for catching fish and his understanding of their behaviour.

== Description ==
Parotocinclus arandai has a single spine and seven soft rays supporting its dorsal fin and five soft rays in its anal fin. This species can be told apart from all other species in its genus by the absence of a dark triangular blotch at the front base of the dorsal fin, by the possession of tufts of hypertrophied odontodes above the eyes and almost naked abdomen in adults. This catfish has an elongated body shape and it reaches a standard length of 4.3 cm (1.7 in).

== Distribution and habitat ==
Parotocinclus arandai is endemic to Brazil where it occurs in the tributaries of the upper and middle Jucurucu River and the upper Buranhém River on the border between the Brazilian states of Bahia and Minas Gerais, as well as in the Salinas River and the Jequitinhonha River basin. This species is found in shallow, clear, lotic streams, with depths of around 30 cm (12 in), with the stream bed composed of sand or gravel.
