= Parotocinclus dani =

Scientific classification
- Kingdom: Animalia
- Phylum: Chordata
- Class: Actinopterygii
- Division: Teleostei
- Order: Siluriformes
- Family: Loricariidae
- Genus: Parotocinclus
- Species: P. dani

Binomial name
- Parotocinclus dani Roxo, Silva & de Oliveira, 2016

Species of fish

Parotocinclus dani is a species of catfish in the family Loricariidae. It is native to South America, where it occurs in tributaries of the Tapajós basin in Brazil.

The species reaches at least 2.73 cm (1.1 inches) SL and can be reportedly distinguished from other members of the genus Parotocinclus by the presence of a triangular blotch at the anterior base of the dorsal fin, the presence of a small platelet in the typical adipose fin region (despite the lack of an adipose fin), an exposed pectoral girdle, an entirely plated abdomen, and dentition that is different from related species. It was described in 2016 by Fábio Fernandes Roxo, Gabriel Souza da Costa e Silva, and Claudio Oliveira. FishBase does not list this species.
