= Parotocinclus yaka =

Scientific classification
- Domain: Eukaryota
- Kingdom: Animalia
- Phylum: Chordata
- Class: Actinopterygii
- Order: Siluriformes
- Family: Loricariidae
- Genus: Parotocinclus
- Species: P. yaka

Binomial name
- Parotocinclus yaka Lehmann, Lima & Reis, 2018

Species of catfish

Parotocinclus yaka is a species of catfish in the family Loricariidae. It is native to South America, where it occurs in Brazil, in tributaries of the Tiquié River, which is a tributary of the Vaupés River in the Amazon River basin. The species reaches at least 3.01 cm (1.2 inches) SL. It was described in 2018 by P. Lehmann A., F. C. T. Lima, and R. E. Reis on the basis of distinctive patterning and cheek morphology.
