= Parotocinclus aripuanensis =

Scientific classification
- Kingdom: Animalia
- Phylum: Chordata
- Class: Actinopterygii
- Order: Siluriformes
- Family: Loricariidae
- Genus: Parotocinclus
- Species: P. aripuanensis

Binomial name
- Parotocinclus aripuanensis Garavello, 1988

Species of catfish

Parotocinclus aripuanensis is a species of catfish in the family Loricariidae. It is a freshwater species endemic to Brazil, where it occurs in the Aripuanã River basin, for which it is named. It is a very small fish that reaches 2.1 cm (0.8 inches) SL.
