= Chapada Diamantina =

Mountain region of Bahia state, Brazil

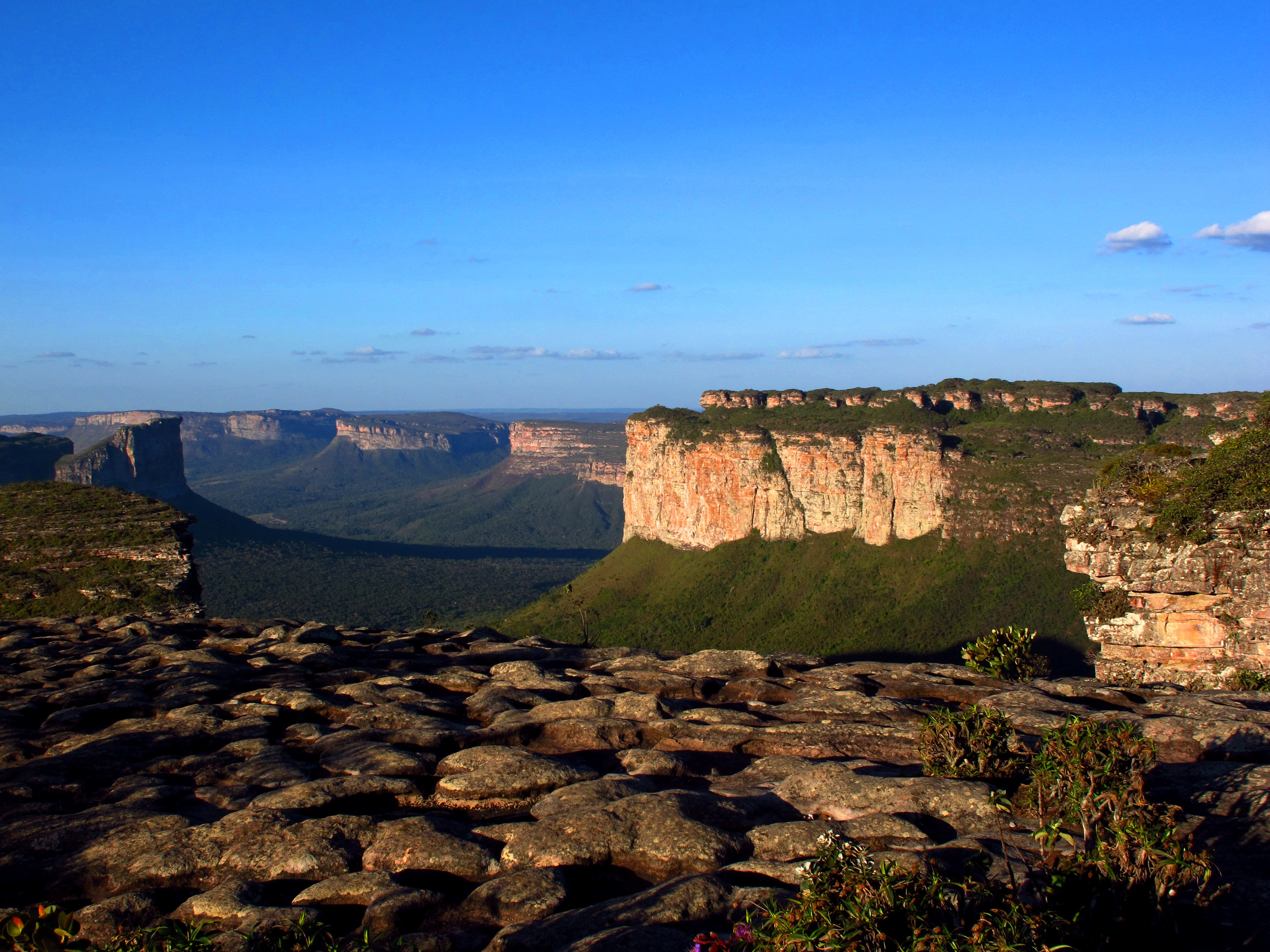
Chapada Diamantina

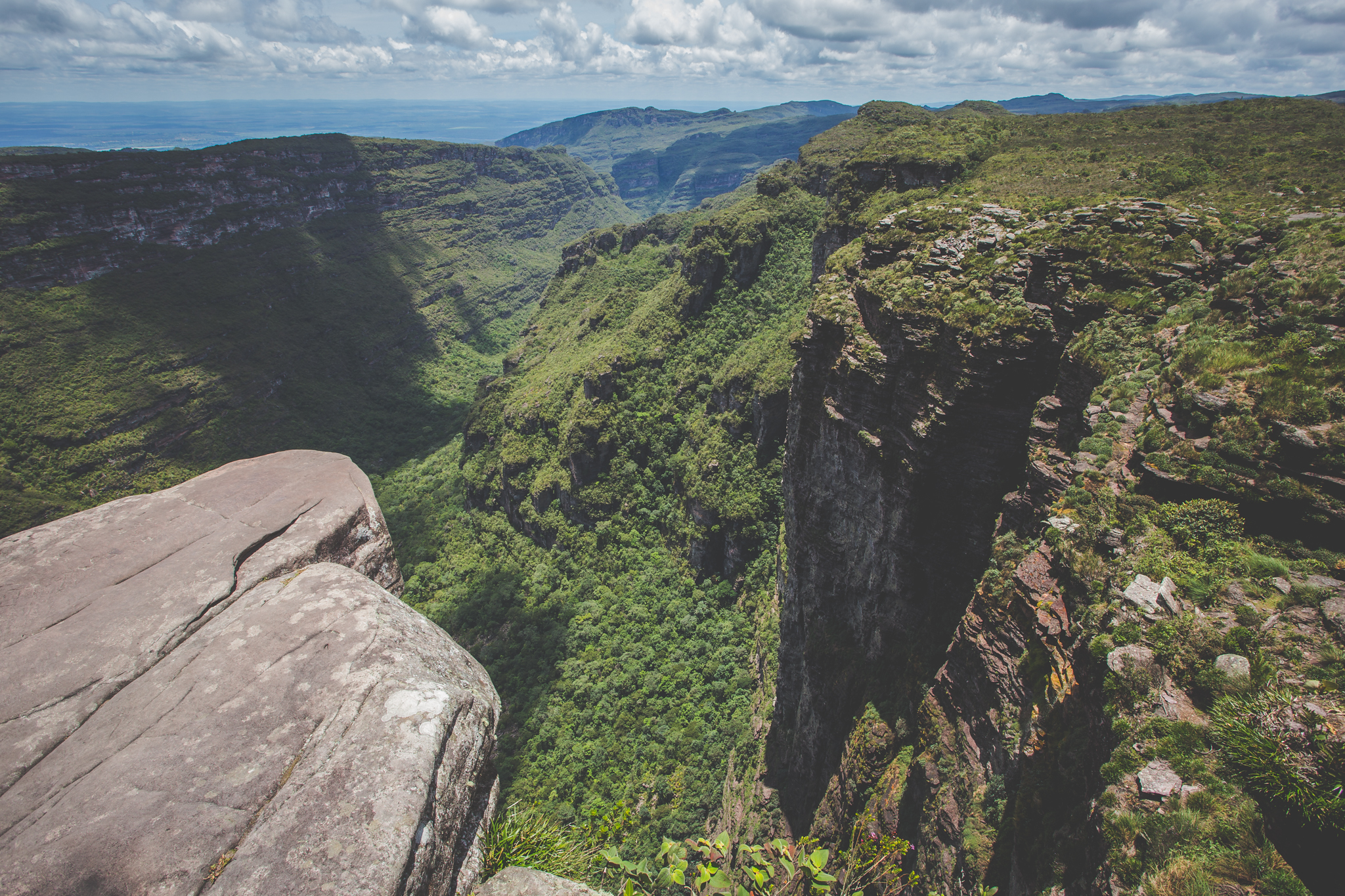
Canyon in Vale do Capão, Bahia

Pictographs in Parque Nacional da Chapada Diamantina

Chapada Diamantina (pronounced [ʃaˈpadɐ dʒi.ɐmɐ̃ˈtʃĩnɐ]; Portuguese for 'Diamond Plateau') is a mountain region of Bahia state, in the Northeast of Brazil. It forms the northern portion of the Espinhaço Mountains.

== Description ==
The Chapada Diamantina lies at the center of Bahia State and forms the northern part of the Espinhaço Mountain Range. The region is approximately 38,000 km^{2} (15,000 sq mi) in area and encompasses 58 municipalities. Technically, this region is considered a part of the caatinga biome, and contains some of its highest elevations, most of it above 500 metres (1,600 ft). The vegetation; a product of the physiographic conditions, is known as cerrado, and consists of rocky plains, dry forests, and caatinga desert vegetation, all of which harbour a great deal of biodiversity and unique endemisms. The region is considered to have a Mesotermic climate, of the Cwb type, according to Köppen Climate classifications. It is normally quite cooler than its surrounding areas, with an average annual temperature under 22 °C. The territory of the Chapada Diamantina runs roughly between the cities of Mucugê (13°00′S 41°22′W) to the south, Andaraí (12°48′S 41°20′W) in the southeast, Lençóis (12°33′S 41°23′W) in the northeast, and Palmeiras (12°31′S 41°35′W) in the northwest. This region is named the Serra do Sincorá Ridge. However, the city of Ibicoara, near the southern limits of Chapada Diamantina, is also becoming important. The Sincorá Ridge is North–South oriented and has a length of 160 km and 20 to 30 km of width.

It has huge canyons with rivers of brownish waters and several waterfalls. The high altitude grasslands are known locally as Gerais. The trails were once used by miners in their search for diamonds. From Lençóis, one of the most important cities in the area, one can find quite a few ecotourism agencies as well as independent guides. Among the main attractions are the Morro do Pai Inácio (Pai Inácio Hill), Cachoeira da Fumaça, Mixila Waterfall, Sossego Waterfall and the Vale do Pati which is considered the best trekking destination in the country. Rock climbing is a relatively new activity, but is developing quickly as some local and outside climbers are opening more and more routes, mainly in the city of Lençóis and at Vale do Capão, district of Palmeiras and at Igatu, district of Andaraí. Lençóis, one of the main cities, is 428 kilometres (266 miles) from Salvador and can be reached by car, bus or plane. Another important city is Iraquara. It has a lot of caves, where prehistoric rock art and other evidence of early human habitation can be found. For this reason, Iraquara received the nickname "City of Caves".

In 1985, the Chapada Diamantina National Park was created with its headquarters in Palmeiras.

== Geology ==
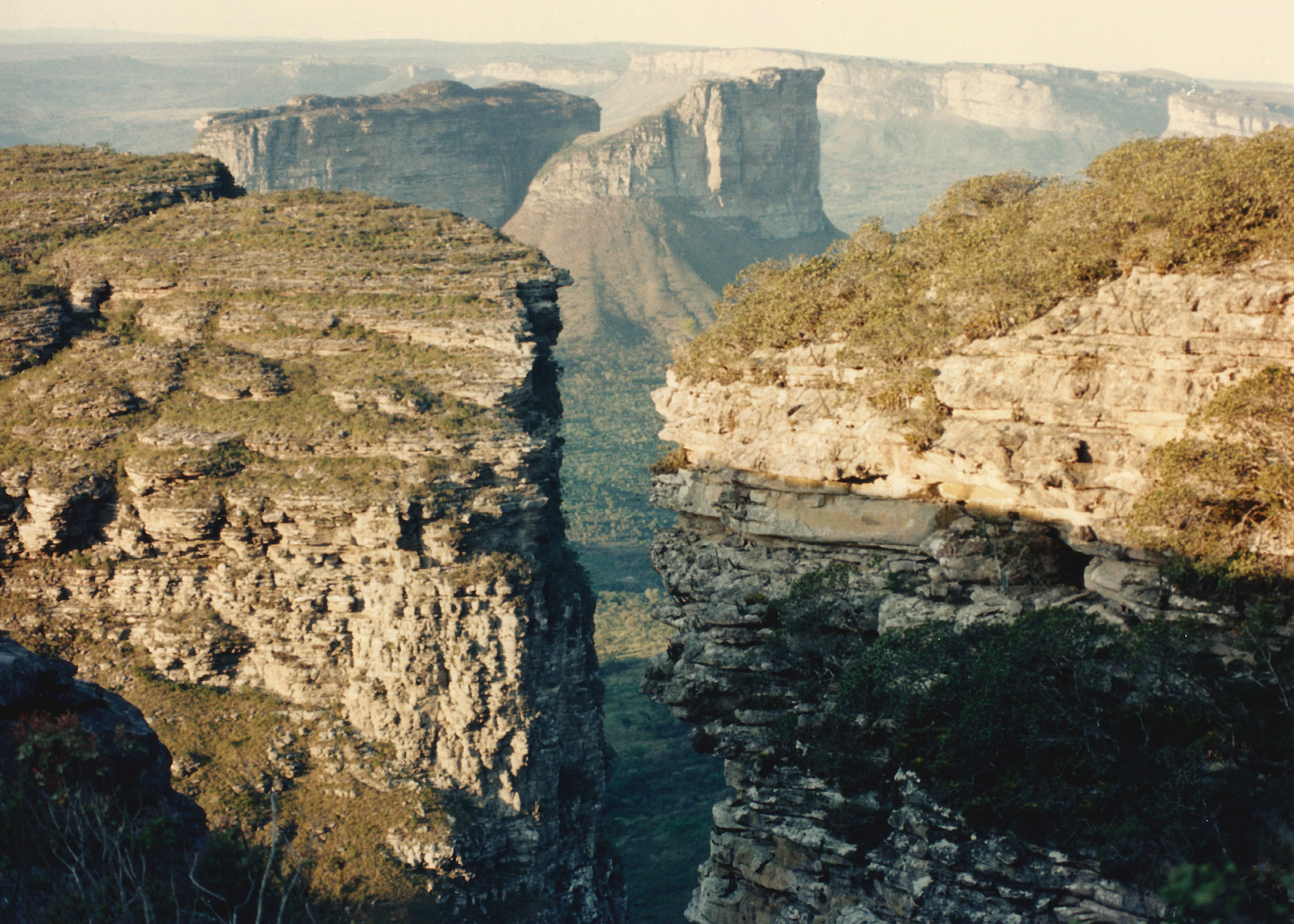
Chapada Diamantina rock formations

Chapada Diamantina is an erosional landform in the state of Bahia, Brazil. The Chapada Diamantina runs from North to South in the middle of Bahia and is an extension of the Espinhaço Range System. The rocks in the system date back to Pangaea and erosion of the formation began in the Precambrian eon. The Range System has an erosional outlier that exposes a contact, the Pai Inácio anticline. The Pai Inácio Anticline is 25 km wide and exposes the sedimentary rocks of the Paraguaçu Group. At the contact there are two different rock groups exposed one being the Chapada Diamantina and the Paraguaçu, with the Chapada Diamantina overlying the Paraguaçu Group. These two rock formations group not only in elasticity but in composition as well. The Chapada Diamantina is composed primarily of sandstone, pelites and diamond bearing conglomerates. The Paraguaçu is composed of fine-grained sandstones, siltstones and argillites. The rocks of the Paraguaçu are softer and therefore more susceptible to weathering and folding. It is the folds in the Paraguaçu that allows for the entry of water into the rock’s structure which in turn is responsible for the erosion.

== See also ==
- List of municipalities in Bahia
- Conjunto Santa Rita
- Iraquara
- Gruta da Torrinha
- List of caves in Brazil
- Chapada Diamantina National Park
