= Parotocinclus spilurus =

Conservation status
- Endangered (IUCN 3.1)

Scientific classification
- Kingdom: Animalia
- Phylum: Chordata
- Class: Actinopterygii
- Order: Siluriformes
- Family: Loricariidae
- Genus: Parotocinclus
- Species: P. spilurus

Binomial name
- Parotocinclus spilurus (Fowler, 1941)

Synonyms
- Plecostomus spilurus Fowler, 1941

Species of catfish

Parotocinclus spilurus is a species of freshwater ray-finned fish belonging to the family Loricariidae, the suckermouth armoured catfishes, and the subfamily Hypoptopomatinae, the cascudinhos. This catfish is endemic to Brazil.

== Taxonomy ==
Parotocinclus spilosoma was first formally described as Plecostomus spilurus in 1941 by the American biologist Henry Weed Fowler with its type locality given as the Salgado River at Icón the Brazilian state of Ceará. Eschmeyer's Catalog of Fishes classified the genus Parotocinclus in the subfamily Hypoptopomatinae, the cascudinhos, within the suckermouth armored catfish family Loricariidae.

== Etymology ==
Parotocinclus spilurus is classified in the genus Parotocinclus, is a combination of para, meaning "near", and the genus Otocinclus, the genus the type species, P. maculicauda was originally thought to be a member of. The specific name, spilurus, combines spilos, meaning “mark” or “spot”, with urus, which means “tail”, an allusion to the black or dark grey, vertical bands on the caudal fin.

== Description ==
Parotocinclus spilurus reaches a standard length of 4 cm (1.6 in). This species is characterised by alternate black and grey bands on the caudal fin.

== Distribution and habitat ==
Parotocinclus spilurus is endemic to Brazil where it is now known from only four locations in the basin of the Salgado River in the Jaguaribe drainage of Ceará. This catfish is confined to clear, fast-flowing water wherethere is a rocky bed. Wherever it is recorded, it is associated with spillways where there is a continuous and strong flow of water and a rocky substrate.
