= Marcetia =

Marcetia may refer to:

- Marcetia (plant), a genus of plants in the family Melastomataceae
- Marcetia (mammal), a fossil genus of mammals in the family Mustelidae
