= Parotocinclus jimi =

Conservation status
- Least Concern (IUCN 3.1)

Scientific classification
- Kingdom: Animalia
- Phylum: Chordata
- Class: Actinopterygii
- Order: Siluriformes
- Family: Loricariidae
- Genus: Parotocinclus
- Species: P. jimi

Binomial name
- Parotocinclus jimi Garavello, 1977

Species of fish

Parotocinclus jimi is a species of freshwater ray-finned fish belonging to the family Loricariidae, the suckermouth armoured catfishes, and the subfamily Hypoptopomatinae, the cascudinhos. This catfish is endemic to Brazil.

== Taxonomy ==
Parotocinclus jimi was first formally described in 1977 by the Brazilian ichthyologist Julio C. Garavello with its type locality given as the Rio do Peixe, a small tributary of the Rio de Contas at the Fazenda Pedra Branca in the municipality of Itagibá in the Brazilian state of Bahia. Eschmeyer's Catalog of Fishes classifies the genus Parotocinclus in the subfamily Hypoptopomatinae, the cascudinhos, within the suckermouth armoured catfish family Loricariidae.

== Etymology ==
Parotocinclus jimi is classified in the genus Parotocinclus, is a combination of para, meaning "near", and the genus Otocinclus, the genus the type species, P. maculicauda was originally thought to be a member of. The specific name, jimi, honours the Brazilian herpetologist and ecologist Jorge Jim who assisted in the collection of the holoptype.

== Description ==
Parotocinclus jimi reaches a total length of 4 cm (1.6 in). This species has 23 or 24 plates along the lateral line with its abdomen wholly covered by plates and platelets. There are 20 to 28 teeth on the premaxilla and between 18 and 25 on the dentary.The overall colour is light gray above with a dark longitudinal line running along the sides with a black spotted yellowish underside

== Distribution ==
Parotocinclus jimi is endemicto Brazil where it occurs in the basins of the Contas and Paraguaçu rivers in Bahia.
