= Parotocinclus bahiensis =

Conservation status
- Least Concern (IUCN 3.1)

Scientific classification
- Kingdom: Animalia
- Phylum: Chordata
- Class: Actinopterygii
- Order: Siluriformes
- Family: Loricariidae
- Genus: Parotocinclus
- Species: P. bahiensis

Binomial name
- Parotocinclus bahiensis (A. Miranda-Ribeiro, 1918)

Synonyms
- Microlepidogaster bahiensis A. Miranda-Ribeiro, 1918

Species of fish

Parotocinclus bahiensis is a species of freshwater ray-finned fish belonging to the family Loricariidae, the suckermouth armoured catfishes, and the subfamily Hypoptopomatinae, the cascudinhos. This catfish is endemic to Brazil.

== Taxonomy ==
Parotocinclus bahiensis was first formally described in 1918 as Microlepidogaster bahiensis by the Brazilian biologist Alípio de Miranda Ribeiro with its type locality given as the Itapicuru River, on Federal highway BR 407, 8 km (5.0 mi) north of Senhor do Bonfim to Juazeiro in the Brazilian state of Bahia at 10°24'49"S, 40°11'1"W. Eschmeyer's Catalog of Fishes classifies the genus Parotocinclus in the subfamily Hypoptopomatinae, the cascudinhos, within the suckermouth armoured catfish family Loricariidae.

== Etymology ==
Parotocinclus bahiensi is classified in the genus Parotocinclus, is a combination of para, meaning "near", and the genus Otocinclus, the genus the type species, P. maculicauda was originally thought to be a member of. The specific name, bahiensis, suffixes Bahia, the species was thought to be endemic to the upper Rio Itapicuru drainage in that state, with -ensis, a Latin suffix meaning "of a place".

== Description ==
Parotocinclus bahiensis reaches a standard length of 3.1 cm (1.2 in).

== Distribution and habitat ==
Parotocinclus bahiensis is endemic to Brazil where it occurs in coastal drainages, from the upper-middle Sergipe River basin in Sergipe south to the Das Almas River basin in Bahia. This catfish has been collected from sites characterised by the river being in excess of 3 m (9.8 ft) in width, 2 m (6 ft 7 in) in depth, with flowing and dark waters, flowining on steep slopes with pools and rapids, and has a stream bed made up of sand and rocks. The vegetation on the banks is mainly grasses and partially submerged sedges.
