= Parotocinclus cristatus =

Conservation status
- Least Concern (IUCN 3.1)

Scientific classification
- Kingdom: Animalia
- Phylum: Chordata
- Class: Actinopterygii
- Order: Siluriformes
- Family: Loricariidae
- Genus: Parotocinclus
- Species: P. cristatus

Binomial name
- Parotocinclus cristatus Garavello, 1977

Species of fish

Parotocinclus cristatus is a species of freshwater ray-finned fish belonging to the family Loricariidae, the suckermouth armoured catfishes, and the subfamily Hypoptopomatinae, the cascudinhos. This catfish is endemic to Brazil.

== Taxonomy ==
Parotocinclus cristatus was first formally described in 1977 by the Brazilian ichthyologist Julio C. Garavello with its type locality given as the Fazenda Almada, Ilhéus in the Brazilian state of Bahia. Eschmeyer's Catalog of Fishes classifies the genus Parotocinclus in the subfamily Hypoptopomatinae, the cascudinhos, within the suckermouth armored catfish family Loricariidae.

== Etymology ==
Parotocinclus cristatus is classified in the genus Parotocinclus, is a combination of para, meaning "near", and the genus Otocinclus, the genus the type species, P. maculicauda was originally thought to be a member of. The specific name, cristatus, means "crested", thought to be an allusion to te tuft of denticles on the supraoccipital bone.

Parotocinclus cristatus is sometimes referred to as the dwarf pleco, although the term "pleco" (a shortened form of "plecostomus") is generally used to refer only to members of the subfamily Hypostominae, and its use to refer to other loricariids is less common. Despite this, "dwarf pleco" is sometimes applied to the genus Parotocinclus as a whole, including in academic literature.

== Description ==
Parotocinclus cristatus reaches a standard length of 4 cm (1.6 in). This species has 22 or 23 plates along its lateral line, the underside is covered in large plates between the coracoids the anal fin, between 3 qand 5 large plates to the side and tow series of irregular central plates. The premaxilla has between 26 and 30 teeth while the dentary has between 24 and 28.

== Distribution ==
Parotocinclus cristatus is endemic to Brazil where it occurs in the Almada River and drainages in the vicinity of Ilheus in Bahia. This species occurs in rivers with flowing water, where there are pools and rapids, a streambed made up of sand, gravel and rocks, and riparian vegetation ranging from conserved intact Atlantic forest to secondary forest.
