= Parotocinclus polyochrus =

Scientific classification
- Kingdom: Animalia
- Phylum: Chordata
- Class: Actinopterygii
- Order: Siluriformes
- Family: Loricariidae
- Genus: Parotocinclus
- Species: P. polyochrus

Binomial name
- Parotocinclus polyochrus Schaefer, 1988

Species of fish

Parotocinclus polyochrus is a fish in the family Loricariidae native to South America. It is found swimming in the upper Negro River basin. This species reaches a length of 3.0 cm (1.2 in).
