= Parotocinclus spilosoma =

Conservation status
- Least Concern (IUCN 3.1)

Scientific classification
- Kingdom: Animalia
- Phylum: Chordata
- Class: Actinopterygii
- Order: Siluriformes
- Family: Loricariidae
- Genus: Parotocinclus
- Species: P. spilosoma

Binomial name
- Parotocinclus spilosoma (Fowler, 1941)

Synonyms
- Plecostomus spilosoma Fowler, 1941

Species of catfish

Parotocinclus spilosoma is a species of freshwater ray-finned fish belonging to the family Loricariidae, the suckermouth armoured catfishes, and the subfamily Hypoptopomatinae, the cascudinhos. This catfish is endemic to Brazil.This species sometimes appears in the aquarium trade.

== Taxonomy ==
Parotocinclus spilosoma was first formally described as Plecostomus spilosoma 1941 by the American biologist Henry Weed Fowler with its type locality given as Campina Grande, Parahyba. Eschmeyer's Catalog of Fishes classified the genus Parotocinclus in the subfamily Hypoptopomatinae, the cascudinhos, within the suckermouth armored catfish family Loricariidae.

== Etymology ==
Parotocinclus spilosoma is classified in the genus Parotocinclus, is a combination of para, meaning "near", and the genus Otocinclus, the genus the type species, P. maculicauda was originally thought to be a member of. The specific name, spilosoma, combines spilos, meaning “mark” or “spot”, with soma, which means “body”, referring to the four dark, vertical bands on the pale body.

== Description ==
Parotocinclus spilosoma has a compressed head and body which is covered with bony plates or scutes which are arranged in a lateral series. The mouth is inferior with lips which form a disc-like mouth. The dorsal fin is supported by a singlespine and five or six soft rays. The ground colour is olive green with irregular gold coloured blotches over the whole length of the body. The first rays of the dorsal, pectoral and caudal fins are olive green with gold bands. The caudal fin is forked with dark vertical bands which alternate from olive green to gold in colour. The iris is gold. This species reaches a total length of 6 cm (2.4 in).

== Distribution and habitat ==
Parotocinclus spilosoma is endemic to Brazil occurring in the states of Paraíba, Pernambuco, Alagoas, Ceará and Rio Grande do Norte being found in the lower São Francisco River region and the Moxotó River basin. This catfish lives in clear, fast-flowing streams with vegetated banks and a bed made up of rocks, pebbles and sand. It eats algae.

== Utilisation ==
Parotocinclus spilosoma occasionally appears in the aquarium trade where. It is sometimes known as the goldcrest spot dwarf pleco.
