= Parotocinclus cabessadecuia =

Scientific classification
- Kingdom: Animalia
- Phylum: Chordata
- Class: Actinopterygii
- Order: Siluriformes
- Family: Loricariidae
- Genus: Parotocinclus
- Species: P. cabessadecuia

Binomial name
- Parotocinclus cabessadecuia T. P. A. Ramos, S. M. Q. Lima & R. T. C. Ramos, 2017

Species of fish

Parotocinclus cabessadecuia is a species of freshwater ray-finned fish belonging to the family Loricariidae, the suckermouth armoured catfishes, and the subfamily Hypoptopomatinae, the cascudinhos. This catfish is endemic to Brazil.

== Taxonomy ==
Parotocinclus cabessadecuia was first formally described in 2017 by the Brazilian ichthyologists Telton P. A. Ramos, Sergio M. Q. Lima and Robson T. da Costa Ramos with its type locality given as the São Gonçalo do Gurguéia, Gurguéia River, in the Parnaíba River basin, in the Brazilian state of Piauí at 10°06'27.0"S, 45°21'24.0"W. Eschmeyer's Catalog of Fishes classifies the genus Parotocinclus in the subfamily Hypoptopomatinae, the cascudinhos, within the suckermouth armored catfish family Loricariidae.

== Etymology ==
Parotocinclus cabessadecuia is classified in the genus Parotocinclus, is a combination of para, meaning "near", and the genus Otocinclus, the genus the type species, P. maculicauda was originally thought to be a member of. The specific name, cabessadecuia, is named for Cabeça de Cuia, which translates as "gourd head", a mythical creature supposed to attack fishermen along the banks of the rio Parnaíba in Piauí State, Brazil, where this fish is found.

== Description ==
Parotocinclus cabessadecuia can be told apart from almost all the other species in the genus Parotocinclus by having a vestigial adipose fin and by having wide dermal plates on the underside. This species reaches a standard length off 33.1 mm (1.30 in).

== Distribution and habitat ==
Parotocinclus cabessadecuia is endemic to Brazil where it occurs in the upper and middle Parnaiba River system in both the main channel and in the tributaries of Gurgueia, Piauí-Canindé, Poti and Balsa rivers.
