= Super Soccer Stars =

American youth soccer development program

- Industry: Youth soccer
- Founder: Gustavo Szulansky
- Headquarters: New York City, New York, U.S.,
- Area served: New York metropolitan area Los Angeles metropolitan area Greater Boston; Miami metropolitan area Chicago metropolitan area Washington metropolitan area Philadelphia metropolitan area Greater Austin; San Diego County; Orange County, California; San Francisco Bay Area; Oahu
- Key people: Adam Geisler (Chief Executive Officer); Carmen Bellavia (Chief Operating Officer & Chief Digital Officer); Dean Simpson (Director of Programs); Toby Tenenbaum (Managing Director, Stars Premier); Gustavo Szulansky (Founder)
- Services: Youth soccer development Afterschool programs
- Website: supersoccerstars.com

Super Soccer Stars is an American youth soccer development program active in the metropolitan areas of New York City, Los Angeles, San Francisco, San Diego, Boston, Miami, Washington, D.C., Philadelphia, Austin, and Chicago. The organization was founded in 2000 by Argentine native Gustavo Szulansky, and is currently owned by Adam Geisler, CEO.

== Overview ==
Gustavo Szulansky, a native of Argentina who moved to New York City in the 1980s, founded Super Soccer Stars in 2000. The impetus to establish the organization came the year before when Szulansky offered to assist with his seven-year-old son's youth soccer team and found that the children did not know the fundamentals of the sport. In his view, "the coaches and instructors lacked a sincere interest in their students and that kids were left unprepared to play in a real soccer game." He thought he "could do it better with more care, affection, and professionalism."

Today, the program annually holds 3,300 weekly classes in over 1,200 locations for over 140,000 boys and girls ages 12 months to 18 years old. Soccer Stars provides community-based soccer development in eleven states and Washington, D.C.. States include Arizona, California, Florida, Hawaii, Illinois, Kansas, Massachusetts, New Jersey, New York, Pennsylvania, and Texas. In the New York metropolitan area alone, 10,000 players participate in the program weekly.

The company employs around 30 full-time staffers, and has over 300 coaches, many of whom work part-time. Super Soccer Stars's flagship facility on the Upper West Side of Manhattan has an indoor turf field.

== Programs ==
=== Super Soccer Stars ===
Super Soccer Stars is the flagship program, with classes "based on age-specific curricula created by a combination of early childhood, soccer, and behavioral specialists."

=== Soccer Stars United ===
Super Soccer Stars Premier is "an advanced soccer development program for players aged 5 and older." The program is separated into two distinct components: a development program and a travel program. NY Stars United has 20 travel teams in the U8-U14 age groups.

=== Super Soccer Stars: Parent & Me ===
Parent & Me is a parent-child pre-soccer and movement program specifically designed for toddlers between 12 and 24 months.

=== Shining Soccer Stars ===
The Shining Soccer Stars Program is a soccer program for children and adults with special needs.

== Philanthropic activities ==
Super Soccer Stars and US-Africa Children's Fellowship (USACF) announced a partnership in 2009. Since then, Super Soccer Stars has held an annual drive during the American holiday season to collect T-shirts, equipment, and soccer balls to donate to USACF-sponsored partner schools in Zimbabwe. In the summer of 2010, 2012 and 2013, in partnership with USACF and Round Star Foundation, Super Soccer Stars sent members of its coaching team to visit these partner schools in rural Zimbabwe and teach soccer to hundreds of school children. In November 2013, Super Soccer Stars partnered with Round Star Foundation and the Ministry of Education in Brazil to send a group of coaches to Iraquara, Bahia to implement a 7-day "Building Soccer Bridges" teacher training and coaching education program.

In the summer of 2009, Super Soccer Stars hosted an event at its New York City facility for the "Don't Play With the Flu" national health awareness campaign featuring U.S. women's national soccer team players Mia Hamm and Brandi Chastain. Hamm and Chastain participated in a coaching clinic in which they taught children about soccer and flu vaccinations.
