= Parotocinclus cesarpintoi =

Conservation status
- Least Concern (IUCN 3.1)

Scientific classification
- Kingdom: Animalia
- Phylum: Chordata
- Class: Actinopterygii
- Order: Siluriformes
- Family: Loricariidae
- Genus: Parotocinclus
- Species: P. cesarpintoi

Binomial name
- Parotocinclus cesarpintoi Miranda-Ribeiro, 1939

Species of fish

Parotocinclus cesarpintoi is a species of freshwater ray-finned fish belonging to the family Loricariidae, the suckermouth armoured catfishes, and the subfamily Hypoptopomatinae, the cascudinhos. This catfish is endemic to Brazil.

== Taxonomy ==
Parotocinclus cesarpintoi was first formally described in 1939 by the Brazilian ichthyologist Paulo de Miranda-Ribeiro with its type locality given as the Riacho Quebrângulo, Paraíba do Meio River drainage, Quebrangulo in the Brazilian state of Alagoas. Eschmeyer's Catalog of Fishes classifies the genus Parotocinclus in the subfamily Hypoptopomatinae, the cascudinhos, within the suckermouth armored catfish family Loricariidae.

== Etymology ==
Parotocinclus cesarpintoi is classified in the genus Parotocinclus, is a combination of para, meaning "near", and the genus Otocinclus, the genus the type species, P. maculicauda was originally thought to be a member of. The specific name, honours the Brazilian helminthologist Cesar Pinto who collected and photographed the holotype, giving it to Miranda-Ribeiro.

== Description ==
Parotocinclus cesarpintoi reaches a standard length of 4 cm (1.6 in). The overall coloration is dark grey, with irregular pale mottling, especially on the back and sides, these coalesce to form a palet, interrupted band on the back and two light bands on the lower sides.

== Distribution and habitat ==
Parotocinclus cesarpintoi is endemic to Brazil where it occurs in the Moxotó and Ipanema rivers, in the lower São Francisco basin in Alagoas and Pernambuco. There is almost no information about the habitat and ecology of this catfish
