= Parotocinclus seridoensis =

Conservation status
- Least Concern (IUCN 3.1)

Scientific classification
- Kingdom: Animalia
- Phylum: Chordata
- Class: Actinopterygii
- Order: Siluriformes
- Family: Loricariidae
- Genus: Parotocinclus
- Species: P. seridoensis

Binomial name
- Parotocinclus seridoensis T. P. A. Ramos, Barros-Neto, Britski & S. M. Q. Lima, 2013

Species of catfish

Parotocinclus seridoensis is a species of freshwater ray-finned fish belonging to the family Loricariidae, the suckermouth armoured catfishes, and the subfamily Hypoptopomatinae, the cascudinhos. This catfish is endemic to Brazil.

== Taxonomy ==
Parotocinclus seridoensis was first formally described in 2013 by the Brazilian ichthyologists Telton P. A. Ramos, Luciano Freitas Barros-Neto, Heraldo A. Britski and Sergio M. Q. Lima with its type locality given as the Seridó River in the basin of the Piranhas-Açu at 6°27’28.4'S, 37°05’10.7'W, in the municipality of Caicó in the Brazilian state of Rio Grande do Norte. Eschmeyer's Catalog of Fishes classified the genus Parotocinclus in the subfamily Hypoptopomatinae, the cascudinhos, within the suckermouth armored catfish family Loricariidae.

== Etymology ==
Parotocinclus seridoensis is classified in the genus Parotocinclus, is a combination of para, meaning "near", and the genus Otocinclus, the genus the type species, P. maculicauda was originally thought to be a member of. The specific name, seridoensis, adds the suffix -ensis meaning "of a place" on to Seridó, from the semi-arid Caatinga region known as “Sertão do Seridó,” Rio Grande do Norte and Paraíba States, one of the most arid parts of the northeastern region of Brazil, where this catfish occurs; probably derived from the native Tapuia language expression ceri-toh, meaning “little foliage and little shade,” a reference to the characteristic Caatinga vegetation, largely made up of small, thorny deciduous trees that lose their foliage in dry periods.

== Description ==
Parotocinclus seridoensis has eight soft rays supporting its dorsal fin and six in its anal fin. It has an elongated body which reaches a standard length of 4.3 cm (1.7 in).

== Distribution and habitat ==
Parotocinclus seridoensis is endemic to Brazil where it is known to occur in just four localities in the basin of the Piranhas-Açu in the states of Rio Grande do Norte and Paraíba. This catfish is found in the Sertão do Seridó" region which is characterised by seasonal intermittent rivers flowing only in the short rainy season, high temperatures and high evaporation. It was typically found in streams with moderate flows and clear water, often under rocks.
