= Parotocinclus amazonensis =

Scientific classification
- Kingdom: Animalia
- Phylum: Chordata
- Class: Actinopterygii
- Order: Siluriformes
- Family: Loricariidae
- Genus: Parotocinclus
- Species: P. amazonensis

Binomial name
- Parotocinclus amazonensis Garavello, 1977

Species of fish

Parotocinclus amazonensis is a species of catfish in the family Loricariidae. It is native to South America, where it occurs in the Amazon River basin in areas with a pH of 6.0 to 7.0 and a dH range of 5 to 15. The species reaches 2.5 cm (1 inch) in total length.
