= A. cearensis =

A. cearensis may refer to:

- Acianthera cearensis, a neotropical orchid
- Amburana cearensis, a timber tree
- Annona cearensis, a custard-apple tree
