= Parotocinclus jacksoni =

Scientific classification
- Kingdom: Animalia
- Phylum: Chordata
- Class: Actinopterygii
- Division: Teleostei
- Order: Siluriformes
- Family: Loricariidae
- Genus: Parotocinclus
- Species: P. jacksoni

Binomial name
- Parotocinclus jacksoni T. P. A. Ramos, Lustosa-Costa, Barros-Neto & Barbosa, 2021

Species of catfish

Parotocinclus jacksoni is a species of freshwater ray-finned fish belonging to the family Loricariidae, the suckermouth armoured catfishes, and the subfamily Hypoptopomatinae, the cascudinhos. This catfish is endemic to Brazil.

== Taxonomy ==
Parotocinclus jacksoni was first formally described in 2021 by the Brazilian ichthyologists Telton Pedro Anselmo Ramos, Silvia Lustosa-Costa, Luciano Freitas Barros-Neto and José E. L. Barbosa with its type locality given as the Fechado River, a tributary to the Mamanguape River, in the municipality of Arara, in the Brazilian state of Paraíba at 06°54'33"S, 35°39'02"W. Eschmeyer's Catalog of Fishes classifies the genus Parotocinclus in the subfamily Hypoptopomatinae, the cascudinhos, within the suckermouth armoured catfish family Loricariidae.

== Etymology ==
Parotocinclus jacksoni is classified in the genus Parotocinclus, which is a combination of para, meaning "near", and the genus Otocinclus, the genus the type species, P. maculicauda, was originally thought to be a member of. The specific name honours the Brazilian composer and singer of Forró and Samba, José Gomes Filho, whose stage name was Jackson do Pandeiro and who was a native of Alagoa Grande, a municipality on the Mamanguape River basin where the type locality of this species is located.

== Description ==
Parotocinclus jacksoni reaches a standard length of 3.5 cm (1.4 in). This species can be told apart from almost all other species in its genus by its abdomen having a small number of small and scattered platelets. It has a laterally exposed pectoral girdle which supports odontodes, apart from at its symphysis. It also differs in its coloration and pattern, teh size of its lower lip and numbers of teeth.

== Distribution and habitat ==
Parotocinclus jacksoni is endemic to Brazil where it occurs in the Mamanguape River basin Paraíba. This catfish is usually found in fast flowing rivers with clean water, a riverbed comprising rock and gravel, over sand. The riparian vegetation is mainly dense scrub with scattered trees. This species has been collected in association with Hypostomus pusarum, Rhamdia quelen, Astyanax bimaculatus, Psalidodon fasciatus, Compsura heterura, Characidium bimaculatum, Saxatilia brasiliensis, Hoplias malabaricus, Leporinus piau, Poecilia reticulata, Serrapinnus piaba, Steindachnerina notonota and Triportheus signatus.
