= Parotocinclus variola =

Scientific classification
- Domain: Eukaryota
- Kingdom: Animalia
- Phylum: Chordata
- Class: Actinopterygii
- Order: Siluriformes
- Family: Loricariidae
- Genus: Parotocinclus
- Species: P. variola

Binomial name
- Parotocinclus variola Lehmann A., Schvambach & Reis, 2015

Species of catfish

Parotocinclus variola is a species of catfish in the family Loricariidae. It is native to South America, where it reportedly occurs in a blackwater creek known as Quebrada Tacana, which is a tributary of the Amazon River in Colombia. The species inhabits sandy areas and reaches 2.9 cm (1.1 inches) SL.
