= Parotocinclus doceanus =

Conservation status
- Least Concern (IUCN 3.1)

Scientific classification
- Kingdom: Animalia
- Phylum: Chordata
- Class: Actinopterygii
- Order: Siluriformes
- Family: Loricariidae
- Genus: Parotocinclus
- Species: P. doceanus

Binomial name
- Parotocinclus doceanus (A. Miranda-Ribeiro, 1918)

Synonyms
- Microlepidogaster doceanus A. Miranda-Ribeiro, 1918

Species of fish

Parotocinclus doceanusis a species of freshwater ray-finned fish belonging to the family Loricariidae, the suckermouth armoured catfishes, and the subfamily Hypoptopomatinae, the cascudinhos. This catfish is endemic to Brazil.

== Taxonomy ==
Parotocinclus doceanus was first formally described in 1918 as Microlepidogaster doceanus by the Brazilian biologist Alípio de Miranda Ribeiro with its type locality given as the Doce River in the Brazilian state of Espírito Santo. Eschmeyer's Catalog of Fishes classifies the genus Parotocinclus in the subfamily Hypoptopomatinae, the cascudinhos, within the suckermouth armoured catfish family Loricariidae.

== Etymology ==
Parotocinclus doceanus is classified in the genus Parotocinclus, is a combination of para, meaning "near", and the genus Otocinclus, the genus the type species, P. maculicauda was originally thought to be a member of. The specific name, bahiensis, suffixes Doce, meaning the Doce River, with -anus, a Latin suffix meaning "belonging to", the Doce River being the type locality.

== Description ==
Parotocinclus doceanus reaches a standard length of 3.1 cm (1.2 in).

== Distribution and habitat ==
Parotocinclus doeceanus is endemic to Brazil where it occurs in the Mucuri and Doce river basins, including coastal rivers between these basins, in the states of Espírito Santo and Minas Gerais. This catfish is found in streams which are 0.5 to 1 m (1 ft 8 in to 3 ft 3 in) in depth, where the stream bed is made up mainly of sand and clay, as well as containing gravel, rocks and leaf litter> The marginal vegetation is mainly grasses and emergent plants, and the surrounding vegetation varies from intact riparian vegetation to degraded, this includes forest fragments, secondary forest, pasture, agriculture and buildings.
