= Parotocinclus robustus =

Conservation status
- Least Concern (IUCN 3.1)

Scientific classification
- Kingdom: Animalia
- Phylum: Chordata
- Class: Actinopterygii
- Order: Siluriformes
- Family: Loricariidae
- Genus: Parotocinclus
- Species: P. robustus

Binomial name
- Parotocinclus robustus Lehmann A. & Reis, 2012

Species of fish

Parotocinclus robustus is a species of freshwater ray-finned fish belonging to the family Loricariidae, the suckermouth armoured catfishes, and the subfamily Hypoptopomatinae, the cascudinhos. This catfish is endemic to Brazil.

== Taxonomy ==
Parotocinclus robustus was first formally described in 2012 by the Brazilian ichthyologists Pablo César Lehmann Albornoz and Roberto Esser dos Reis with its type locality given as a creek 45 km (28 mi) south of Montes Claros on highway BR-135 towards Bocaiúva, Jequitaí River basin at 17°05’31'S 043°49’48'W, in the municipality of Bocaiúva, in the Brazilian state of Minas Gerais. Eschmeyer's Catalog of Fishes classifies the genus Parotocinclus in the subfamily Hypoptopomatinae, the cascudinhos, within the suckermouth armored catfish family Loricariidae.

== Etymology ==
Parotocinclus robustus is classified in the genus Parotocinclus, is a combination of para, meaning "near", and the genus Otocinclus, the genus the type species, P. maculicauda was originally thought to be a member of. The specific name, robustus, is Latin and means “oak”or ”oaken”, as well as “solid”, “hard” or “firm”, although it is used in ichthyological nomenclature to indicate “stoutness” or “thickness”. Here it refers to the “strong and robust” morphology of this catfish.

== Description ==
Parotocinclus robustus has an elongated body and it reaches a standard length of 4.2 cm (1.7 in). Similar to P. prata this species has a wholly naked abdomen but differs from that species by having the lower surface of the head behind the lower lip being smooth.

== Distribution and habitat ==
Parotocinclus robustus is endemic to Brazil where it is known to occur in three rivers that belong to the middle and upper São Francisco River basin: the Das Velhas River and the Jequitaí river, on the right bank, and the Paracatu River, on the left bank. This distribution suggests that the species may be more widely distributed along the São Francisco River basin. This catfish is found in shallow rivers with slow to moderate flow speed, a depth of 0.4 to 1.5 m (1.31 to 4.92 ft), mostly clear water, and a mixed substrate consisting of stones, gravel, sand, and occasionally mud. The environments inhabited by this species usually have marginal vegetation, which the fish is often found in association with.
