= Parotocinclus planicauda =

Conservation status
- Least Concern (IUCN 3.1)

Scientific classification
- Kingdom: Animalia
- Phylum: Chordata
- Class: Actinopterygii
- Order: Siluriformes
- Family: Loricariidae
- Genus: Parotocinclus
- Species: P. planicauda

Binomial name
- Parotocinclus planicauda Garavello & Britski, 2003

Species of fish

Parotocinclus planicauda is a species of freshwater ray-finned fish belonging to the family Loricariidae, the suckermouth armoured catfishes, and the subfamily Hypoptopomatinae, the cascudinhos. This catfish is endemic to Brazil.

== Taxonomy ==
Parotocinclus planicauda was first formally described in 2003 by the Brazilian ichthyologists Heraldo A. Britski and Julio C. Garavello with its type locality given as the Suaçui Pequeno River, Barra do Rochedo, at Antonio Pereira de Oliveira farm, 20 km (12 mi) from Coroaci, in the Brazilian state of Minas Gerais. Eschmeyer's Catalog of Fishes classifies the genus Parotocinclus in the subfamily Hypoptopomatinae, the cascudinhos, within the suckermouth armored catfish family Loricariidae.

== Etymology ==
Parotocinclus planicauda is classified in the genus Parotocinclus, is a combination of para, meaning "near", and the genus Otocinclus, the genus the type species, P. maculicauda was originally thought to be a member of. The specific name, planicauda, means "flat tail", an allusion to the cross section of the caudal peduncle being rather quadrangular with flat sides.

== Description ==
Parotocinclus planicauda has an elongated body shape and it reaches a standard length of 4.3 cm (1.7 in). It can reportedly be distinguished from its congeners by the presence of a caudal peduncle with an almost quadrangular cross-section.

== Distribution and habitat ==
Parotocinclus planicauda is endemic to Brazil where it occurs in the basin of the Doce River in Minas Gerais and Espírito Santo. There is no information on the natural history of this catfish.
