= Marcetia (plant) =

Scientific classification
- Kingdom: Plantae
- Clade: Tracheophytes
- Clade: Angiosperms
- Clade: Eudicots
- Clade: Rosids
- Order: Myrtales
- Family: Melastomataceae
- Genus: Marcetia; DC.

Species of flowering plant

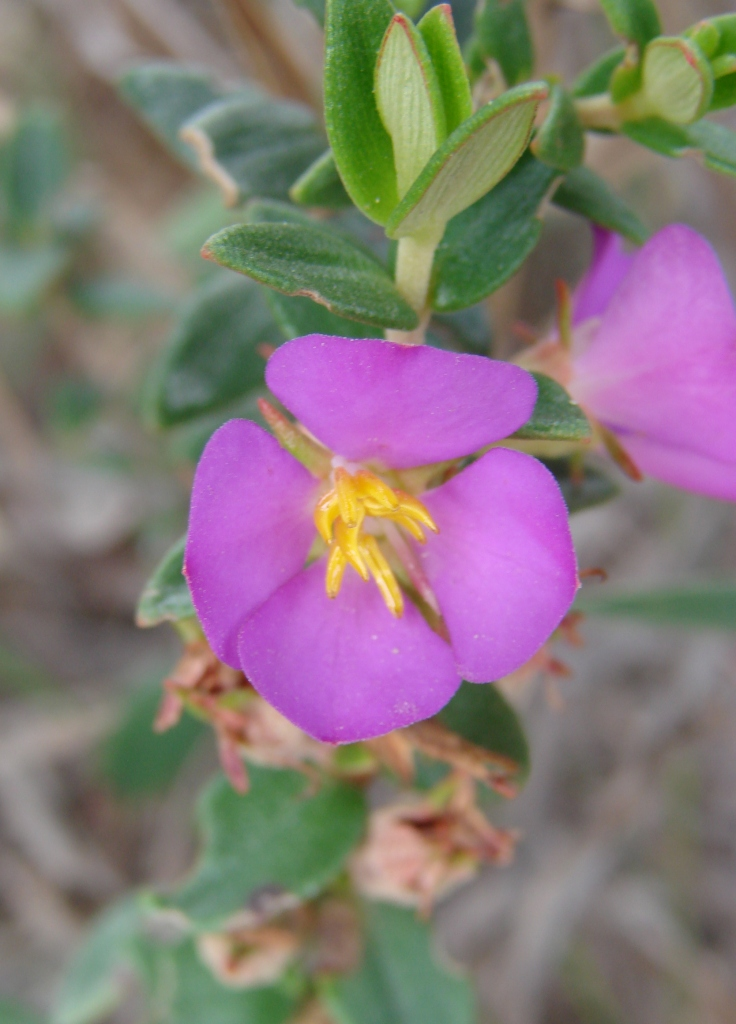
Marcetia harleyi, Chapada Diamantina National Park, Brazil

Marcetia is a genus of flowering plants belonging to the family Melastomataceae.

Its native range is Southern Tropical America. It is found in Brazil, Colombia, Guyana and Venezuela.

The genus name of Marcetia is in honour of François Marcet (1803–1883), a Swiss doctor, physiologist, inventor, and professor of physics. It was first described and published in Prodr. Vol.3 on page 124 in 1828.

== Species ==
According to Kew:

- Marcetia acerosa DC.
- Marcetia alba Ule
- Marcetia bahiana (Ule) A.B.Martins
- Marcetia bahiensis (Brade & Markgr.) Wurdack
- Marcetia bracteolaris Cogn.
- Marcetia candolleana A.K.A.Santos & A.B.Martins
- Marcetia canescens Naudin
- Marcetia cardosoana A.K.A.Santos & A.B.Martins
- Marcetia eimeariana A.B.Martins & Woodgyer
- Marcetia ericoides Cogn.
- Marcetia formosa Wurdack
- Marcetia grandiflora Markgr.
- Marcetia harleyi Wurdack
- Marcetia hatschbachii A.B.Martins
- Marcetia lanuginosa Wurdack
- Marcetia latifolia Naudin
- Marcetia luetzelburgii Markgr.
- Marcetia lychnophoroides A.B.Martins
- Marcetia macrophylla Wurdack
- Marcetia mucugensis Wurdack
- Marcetia nervulosa Markgr.
- Marcetia nummularia Markgr.
- Marcetia oxycoccoides Wurdack & A.B.Martins
- Marcetia paganuccii A.K.A.Santos & A.B.Martins
- Marcetia semiriana A.B.Martins
- Marcetia shepherdii A.B.Martins
- Marcetia sincorensis Wurdack
- Marcetia taxifolia DC.
- Marcetia velutina Markgr.
- Marcetia viscida Wurdack
