= Parotocinclus jequi =

Conservation status
- Least Concern (IUCN 3.1)

Scientific classification
- Kingdom: Animalia
- Phylum: Chordata
- Class: Actinopterygii
- Order: Siluriformes
- Family: Loricariidae
- Genus: Parotocinclus
- Species: P. jequi

Binomial name
- Parotocinclus jequi Lehmann A., Koech Braun, E. H. L. Pereira & Reis, 2013

Species of fish

Parotocinclus jequi is a species of freshwater ray-finned fish belonging to the family Loricariidae, the suckermouth armoured catfishes, and the subfamily Hypoptopomatinae, the cascudinhos. This catfish is endemic to Brazil.

== Taxonomy ==
Parotocinclus jequi was first formally described in 2013 by the Brazilian ichthyologists Pablo César Lehmann A., Bruna Koech Braun, Edson Henrique Lopes Pereira and Roberto Esser dos Reis with its type locality given as a headwater creek of the Jequitinhonha River at Cachoeira do Moinho de Esteira, on road BR-259 from Serro to Pedro Lessa at 18°34'21"S, 43°29'35"W in Serro in the Brazilian state of Minas Gerais. Eschmeyer's Catalog of Fishes classifies the genus Parotocinclus in the subfamily Hypoptopomatinae, the cascudinhos, within the suckermouth armoured catfish family Loricariidae.

== Etymology ==
Parotocinclus jequi is classified in the genus Parotocinclus, is a combination of para, meaning "near", and the genus Otocinclus, the genus the type species, P. maculicauda was originally thought to be a member of. The specific name, jequi, derived from the Tupí word ye’kei, a kind of fish trap, and the first part of the name of the Jequitinhonha River, which translates as “field of the river traps”, drainage where this species is endemic.

== Description ==
Parotocinclus jequi has an elongated body and it reaches a standard length of 5.4 cm (2.1 in). It has a single spine and 7 soft rays in its dorsal fin and 6 in its anal fin. This catfish has no plates on the abdomen between the pectoral girdle and the anus.

== Distribution ==
Parotocinclus jequi is known from just three localations, all in the Jequitinhonha River basin, including the type locality at the headwaters of the Jequitinhonha River, the Marapuamba stream in Turmalina and in the Vacaria River. This species is a small, herbivorous catfish which was originally collected from a headwater stream at 1,200 m (3,900 ft) a. s. l.. The fishes were collected from a shallow section, with a depth between 0.3 and 1.20 m (1 ft 0 in and 3 ft 11 in), where the water was clear and the streambase made up of gravel and stones.
