= Cachoeira da Fumaça =

Coordinates: 12°36′10″S 41°26′52″W

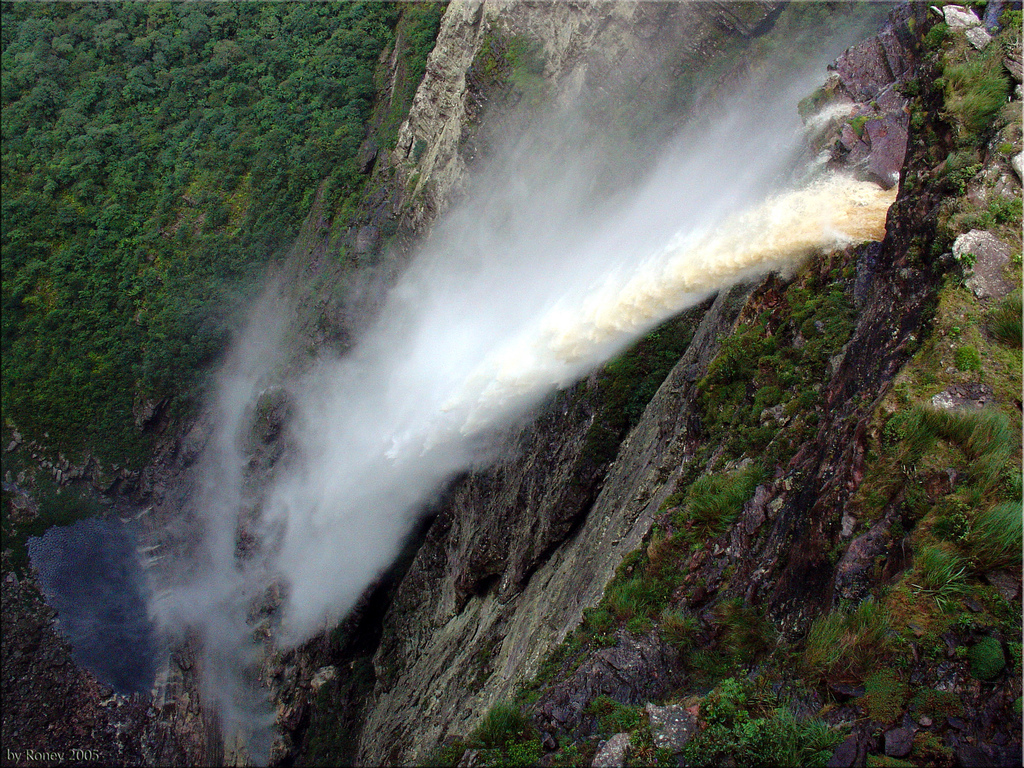
- Cachoeira da Fumaça
- Interactive map of Cachoeira da Fumaça
- Location: Chapada Diamantina, Bahia, Brazil
- Total height: 340 m (1,120 ft)

The Cachoeira da Fumaça ("Smoke Falls", also known as "Glass Falls") is 340-metre-tall (1,120 ft) waterfall in Bahia, Brazil. It was believed to be the country's highest waterfall until the 353 m-tall (1,158 ft) Cachoeira do Araca (Cachoeira do El Dorado) was recently discovered in the state of Amazonas.

Cachoeira da Fumaça is located in Palmeiras, Bahia, Chapada Diamantina, an attractive region for adventurers, named that way because the tiny water flow is sprayed by the wind before it touches the ground. However, depending on the season, it can be completely dry.

There are two ways to reach it: from above, walking 6 kilometers (3.7 mi) from the ecological base placed in the Vale do Capão, or from below, after a three-day trek starting from Lençóis, Chapada's best-known city.

Local people knew about the waterfall but wider public learned about it after it was noticed by bush pilot George Glass in 1960.

== Film ==
In the 2006 film Dhoom 2, there is a scene at the waterfall where Sunehri (Aishwarya Rai) is dared to jump off without any support mechanism in order to gain Aryan's (Hrithik Roshan) trust. She does so only to have him leap behind her with a bungee cord.

== See also ==
- List of waterfalls
