= Pico do Barbado =

Mountain in Bahia, Brazil

- Location within Brazil

Highest point
- Elevation: 2,033 m (6,670 ft)
- Coordinates: 13°18′S 41°54′W

Naming
- Language of name: Brazilian Portuguese

Geography
- Location: Bahia, Brazil

Pico do Barbado is the highest mountain in the Brazilian state of Bahia, and the highest in all Northeastern Brazil, reaching 2,033 metres (6,670 ft) above sea level. It is located within the area of the Chapada Diamantina National Park. From Catolés, it is possible to reach the peak via a trail.
