= Iraquara =

Municipality of Bahia State, Brazil

Coordinates: 12°14′56″S 41°37′08″W

Iraquara City of Caves
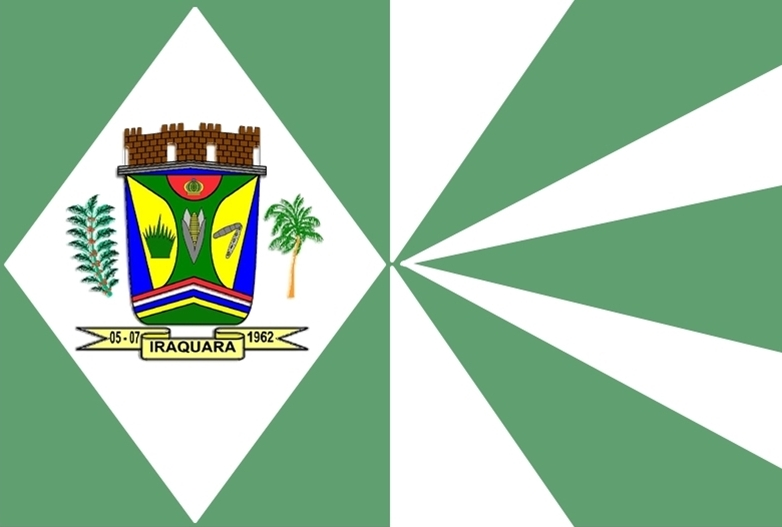
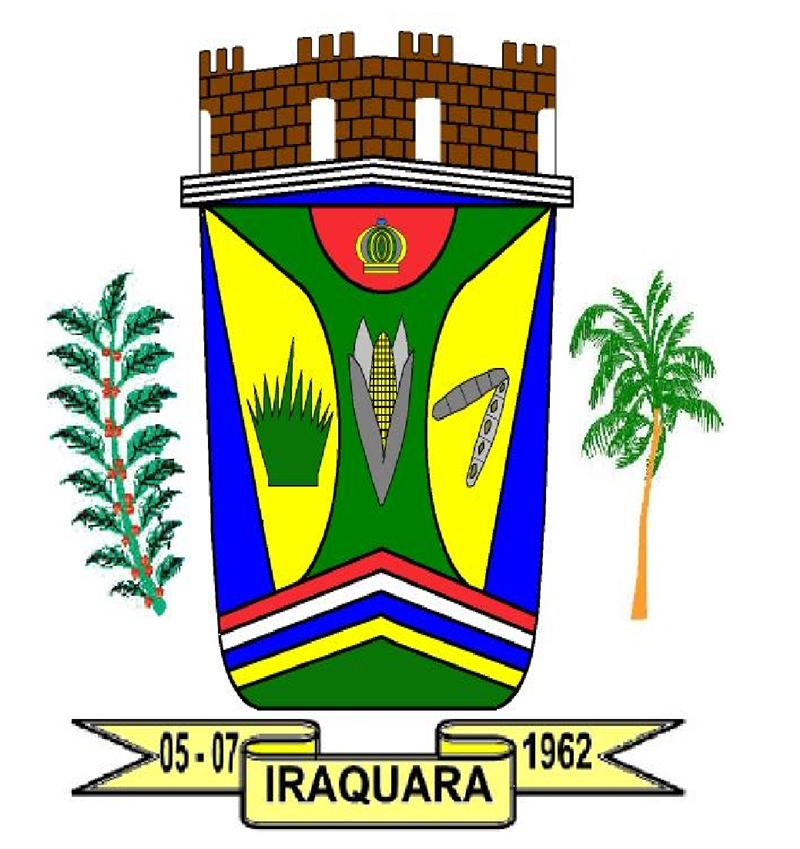
- Flag Coat of arms
- Nickname: City of Caves
- morro do chapeu localization map of the state ahia

- Location in Brazil
- Country: Brazil
- Region: Nordeste
- State: Bahia
- Mesoregion: Centro Norte Baiano

Area
  - Total: 309.010 sq mi (800.332 km^{2})

Population (2020)
  - Total: 25,478
- Time zone: UTC−3 (BRT)
- Postal code: 46980-000
- Website: iraquara.ba.gov.br

Iraquara is a municipality in the state of Bahia in the North-East region of Brazil.

== Geography ==
In 2020, its estimated population was 25,478 inhabitants. It lies in the center of Bahia, in the Chapada Diamantina. Tourists visit to see the caves such as: Pratinha, Lapa Doce, Torrinha, Gruta Azul, Gruta da Fumaça, among others.

== See also ==
- Chapada Diamantina
- List of municipalities in Bahia
- Conjunto Santa Rita
- Gruta da Torrinha
- List of caves in Brazil
- Chapada Diamantina National Park
