= Parotocinclus cearensis =

Conservation status
- Least Concern (IUCN 3.1)

Scientific classification
- Kingdom: Animalia
- Phylum: Chordata
- Class: Actinopterygii
- Order: Siluriformes
- Family: Loricariidae
- Genus: Parotocinclus
- Species: P. cearensis

Binomial name
- Parotocinclus cearensis Garavello, 1977

Species of fish

Parotocinclus cearensis is a species of freshwater ray-finned fish belonging to the family Loricariidae, the suckermouth armoured catfishes, and the subfamily Hypoptopomatinae, the cascudinhos. This catfish is endemic to Brazil.

== Taxonomy ==
Parotocinclus cearensis was first formally described in 1977 by the Brazilian ichthyologist Julio C. Garavello with its type locality given as the Gusmao Stream, Ipu in the Brazilian state of Ceará. Eschmeyer's Catalog of Fishes classifies the genus Parotocinclus in the subfamily Hypoptopomatinae, the cascudinhos, within the suckermouth armored catfish family Loricariidae.

== Etymology ==
Parotocinclus cearensis is classified in the genus Parotocinclus, is a combination of para, meaning "near", and the genus Otocinclus, the genus the type species, P. maculicauda was originally thought to be a member of. The specific name, cearensis, suffixes Ceará, the species was thought to be endemic to that state, with -ensis, a Latin suffix meaning "of a place".

== Description ==
Parotocinclus cearensis reaches a standard length of 5 cm (2.0 in). This species has 23 or 24 plates along its lateral line, the underside is almost naked with a row of small plates on each side and a group of platelets scattered aon the area in front of the anal fin. The premaxilla has between 20 and 23 teeth while the dentary has between 19 and 23.

== Distribution and habitat ==
Parotocinclus cearensis is endemic to Brazil where it occurs in the Parnaíba River and São Francisco River in the states of Ceará, Piauí, Rio Grande do Norte, Paraíba and Pernambuco. This species has been collected from narrow streams, with a streambed consisting of sand and rock, a slow current and clear, slightly turbid water.
