= Parotocinclus bidentatus =

Conservation status
- Data Deficient (IUCN 3.1)

Scientific classification
- Kingdom: Animalia
- Phylum: Chordata
- Class: Actinopterygii
- Order: Siluriformes
- Family: Loricariidae
- Genus: Parotocinclus
- Species: P. bidentatus

Binomial name
- Parotocinclus bidentatus Gauger & Buckup, 2005

Species of fish

Parotocinclus bidentatus is a species of freshwater ray-finned fish belonging to the family Loricariidae, the suckermouth armoured catfishes, and the subfamily Hypoptopomatinae, the cascudinhos. This catfish is endemic to Brazil.

== Taxonomy ==
Parotocinclus arandai was first formally described in 2005 by the Brazilian ichthyologists Marco F. W. Gauger and Paulo Andreas Buckup with its type locality given as the Pirapetinga, in the municipality of Resende at 22°28'08"S, 44°26'48"W in the Brazilian state of Rio de Janeiro. Eschmeyer's Catalog of Fishes classifies the genus Parotocinclus in the subfamily Hypoptopomatinae, the cascudinhos, within the suckermouth armored catfish family Loricariidae.

== Etymology ==
Parotocinclus bidentatus is classified in the genus Parotocinclus, is a combination of para, meaning "near", and the genus Otocinclus, the genus the type species, P. maculicauda was originally thought to be a member of. The specific name, bidentatus, means "twice toothed", an allusion to the two types of teeth in this species, the typical teeth in the mouth and an additional patch of teeth in the upper and lower jaws.

== Description ==
Parotocinclus bidentatus has an additional patch of single cusped teeth. The colour is brown with a yellowish underside.This species reaches a standard length of 3.8 cm (1.5 in).

== Distribution ==
Parotocinclus bidentatus is endemic to Brazil where it is known only from its type series which was collected from the Pirapetinga River, near Resende, and the Calçado River, near Três Rios in the catchment of the Paraíba do Sul in the state of Rio de Janeiro.

== Conservation status ==
Parotocinclus bidentatus is only known from its type series and the lack of information abouts its biology, distribution, population and any threats have led the International Union for Conservation of Nature to classify this species as Data Deficient.
