= Palmeiras, Bahia =

Municipality of Bahia, Brazil

Coordinates: 12.5289°S 41.5589°W

Palmeiras
- Municipality
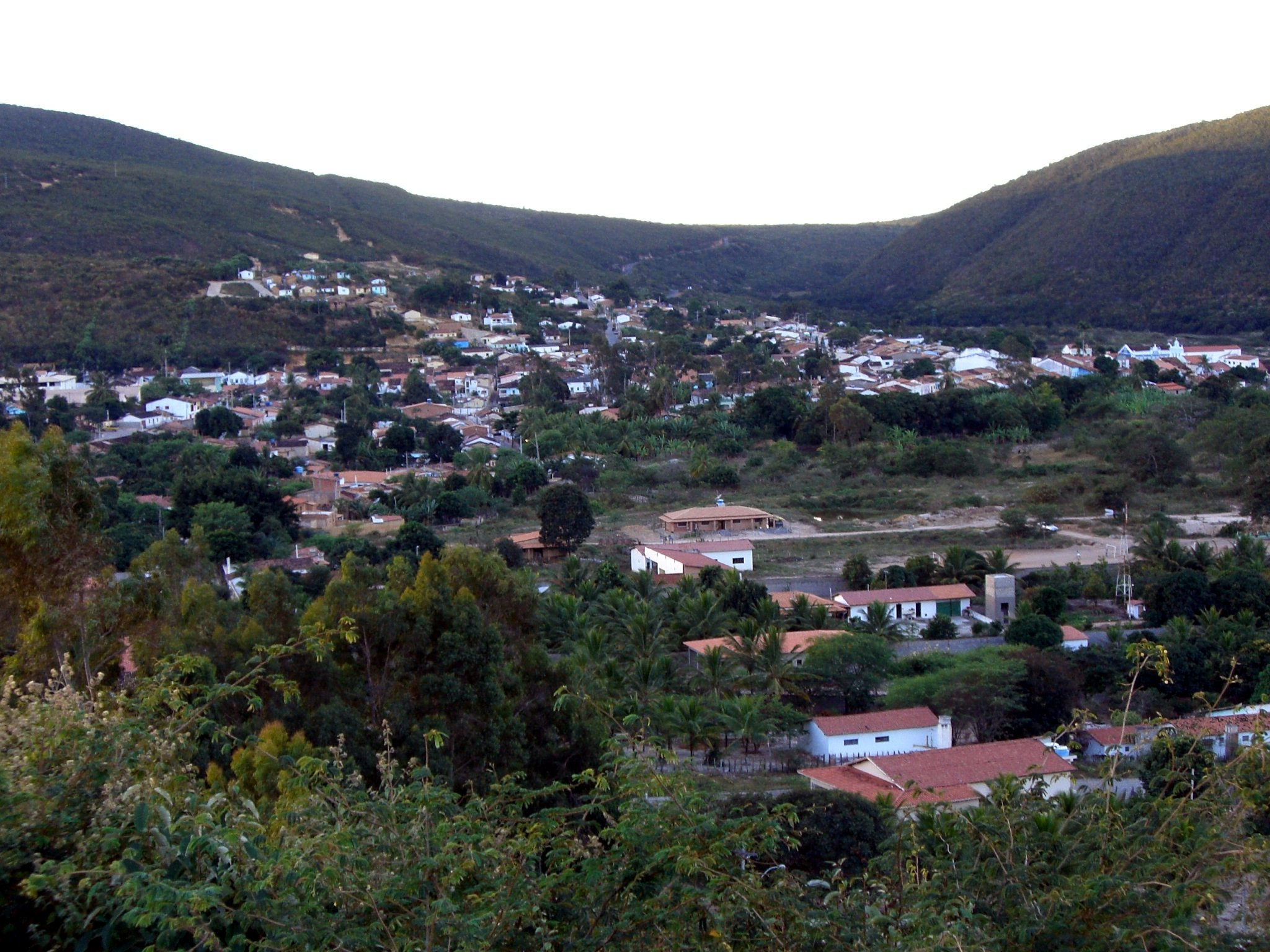

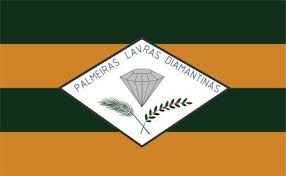
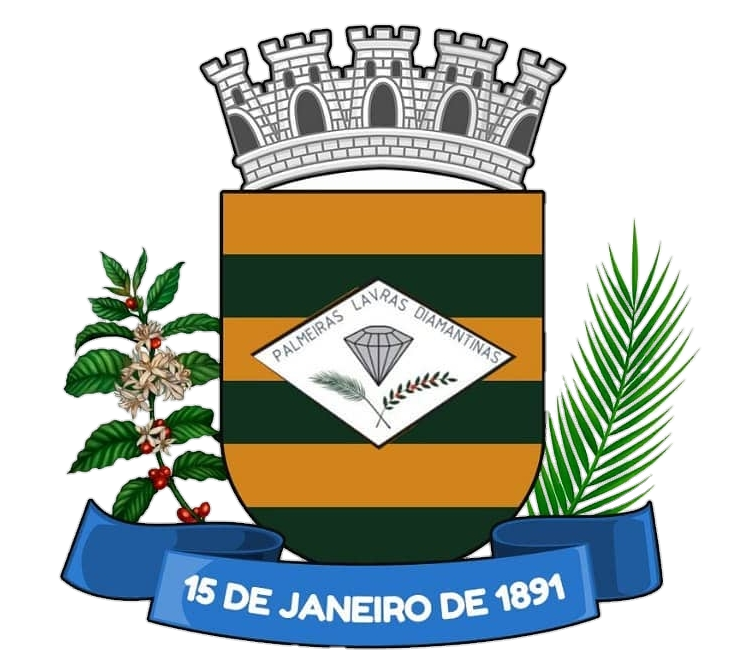
- Flag Coat of arms
- Interactive map of Palmeiras
- Country: Brazil
- Region: Nordeste
- State: Bahia

Population (2020)
  - Total: 9,071
- Time zone: UTC−3 (BRT)

Palmeiras is a municipality in the state of Bahia in the North-East region of Brazil.

Palmeiras is an important tourist site in the Chapada Diamantina region. It is the site of the Vale do Capão (Capao Valley) or Caete-Açu, the Cachoeira da Fumaça (Smoke Falls) and the Morro do Pai Inácio (Pai Inacio Hill), among other landscape features.

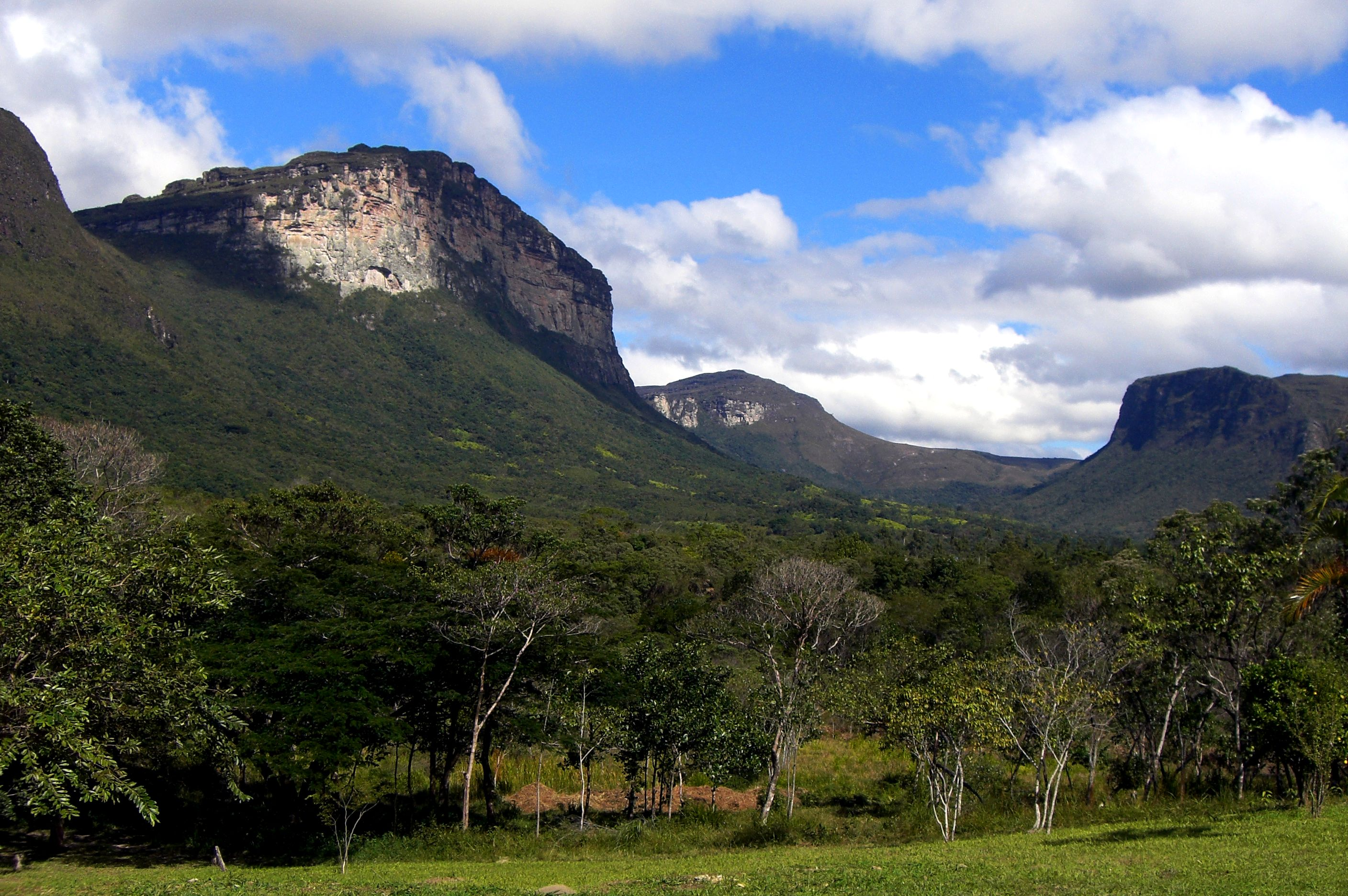

== See also ==
- List of municipalities in Bahia
