= Parotocinclus prata =

Conservation status
- Least Concern (IUCN 3.1)

Scientific classification
- Kingdom: Animalia
- Phylum: Chordata
- Class: Actinopterygii
- Order: Siluriformes
- Family: Loricariidae
- Genus: Parotocinclus
- Species: P. prata

Binomial name
- Parotocinclus prata A. C. Ribeiro, A. A. Melo and E. H. L. Pereira, 2002

Species of fish

Parotocinclus prata is a species of freshwater ray-finned fish belonging to the family Loricariidae, the suckermouth armoured catfishes, and the subfamily Hypoptopomatinae, the cascudinhos. This catfish is endemic to Brazil.

== Taxonomy ==
Parotocinclus prata was first formally described in 2002 by the Brazilian ichthyologists Alexandre Cunha Ribeiro Alex Luiz de Andrade Melo and Edson Henrique Lopes Pereira with its type locality given as the headwaters of the Prata River, a stream tributary of the Quiricó River, part of the São Francisco basin, in the municipality of Presidente Olegário at the fazenda São Zeferino, near Galena, at about 18°22'S, 46°14.3'W, Minas Gerais. Eschmeyer's Catalog of Fishes classifies the genus Parotocinclus in the subfamily Hypoptopomatinae, the cascudinhos, within the suckermouth armored catfish family Loricariidae.

== Etymology ==
Parotocinclus prata is classified in the genus Parotocinclus, is a combination of para, meaning "near", and the genus Otocinclus, the genus the type species, P. maculicauda was originally thought to be a member of. The specific name, prata, is the name of the river the type locality is located in.

== Description ==
Parotocinclus prata has an elongated body shape and it reaches a standard length of 5 cm (2.0 in). It can be distinguished from its congeners by the absence of any plates on the abdomen and by having reduced plates on the snout. It also has between 25 and 29 median plates and shows only a small area of expose pectoral girdle on each side.

== Distribution and habitat ==
Parotocinclus prata is endemic to Brazil where it occurs in the São Francisco River basin in Minas Gerais. It is most often found either in clear creeks, surrounded by dense forest, with a substrate of rocks, pebbles, sand and occasionally leaf litter, or in larger water bodies with scarce marginal vegetation and an exclusively sandy substrate. The species is known to feed on cyanobacteria, diatoms, green algae, and other organic matter.
