= Conjunto Santa Rita =

Cave complex in Bahia, Brazil

- Location within Brazil
- Location: Iraquara, Bahia, Brazil
- Coordinates: 12.3432°S 41.5736°W
- Length: 17,050 metres (55,940 ft)

Conjunto Santa Rita is a complex of limestone caves in the municipality of Iraquara, Bahia, Brazil. It is 17,050 metres (55,940 ft) long and the target of traditional pilgrimage. It contains numerous offerings on the altar and inside. The cave has two large parallel galleries joined by a smaller gallery being both associated with a lower slope. About 600 m have been mapped. The highlight of the cave is a spectacular calcite run-off resembling curtains of over 12 m tall, besides beautiful stratigraphic features on the walls. The small and adjacent Gruta Santa Rita II has also been mapped.

== See also ==
- List of caves in Brazil
