= Chapada Diamantina National Park =

National park in Bahia, Brazil

- IUCN category II (national park)
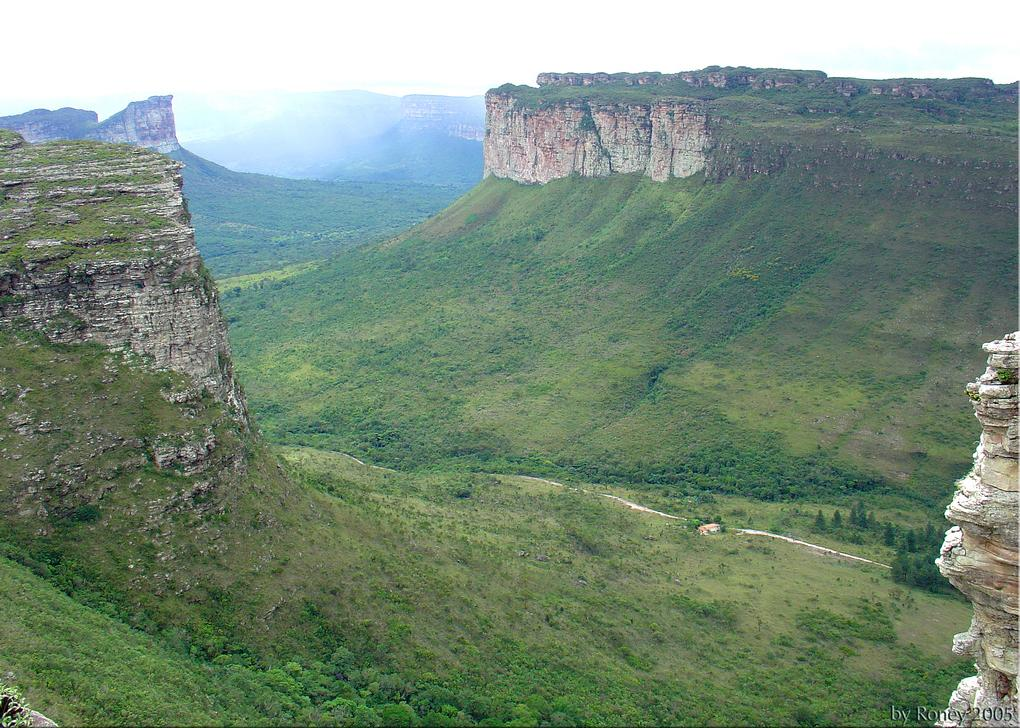
- Escarpments in the park

- Location within Brazil
- Location: Bahia, Brasil
- Coordinates: 12°52′49″S 41°22′20″W
- Area: 152,142 ha (587.42 sq mi)
- Designation: National park
- Created: 17 September 1985
- Administrator: ICMBio

The Chapada Diamantina National Park (Portuguese: Parque Nacional da Chapada Diamantina [ʃaˈpadɐ dʒi.amɐ̃ˈtʃĩnɐ]) is a national park in the Chapada Diamantina (Note: "Chapada" means an area of cliffs, typically at the edge of a plateau. "Diamantina" refers to the diamonds that were found in the range in the mid-19th century.) region of the State of Bahia, Brazil. The terrain is rugged and mainly covered by the flora of the Caatinga biome.

== Location ==
The park is in the Caatinga biome, and covers 152,142 hectares (375,950 acres). It was created by decree 91.655 of 17 September 1985, and is administered by the Chico Mendes Institute for Biodiversity Conservation. The park covers parts of the municipalities of Palmeiras, Mucugê, Lençóis, Ibicoara and Andaraí in the state of Bahia.

== Terrain ==
The park is in the Chapada Diamantina, a plateau bounded by cliffs of 41,751 square kilometres (16,120 sq mi) in central Bahia. Altitudes in the plateau typically vary from 500 to 1,000 metres (1,600 to 3,300 ft). In the more mountainous parts, there are several peaks of 1,600 to 1,800 metres (5,200 to 5,900 ft), and a few over 2,000 metres (6,600 ft). The plateau forms a watershed, draining on one side into the São Francisco River and on the other into the De Contas River and Paraguaçu River.

The park lies in the rugged Sincorá Range on the east side of the plateau, an area of folded, heavily eroded structures. The range is elongated in a north-south direction, and has an average width of 25 kilometres (16 mi). The highest point of the state is in the park, the 2,036 metres (6,680 ft) Pico do Barbado. Both gold and diamonds have been found in the range. The range forces moist air moving west from the sea upward, which causes higher levels of rainfall, particularly in the east. There are many systems of caves formed by the rivers of the region.

== Flora and fauna ==
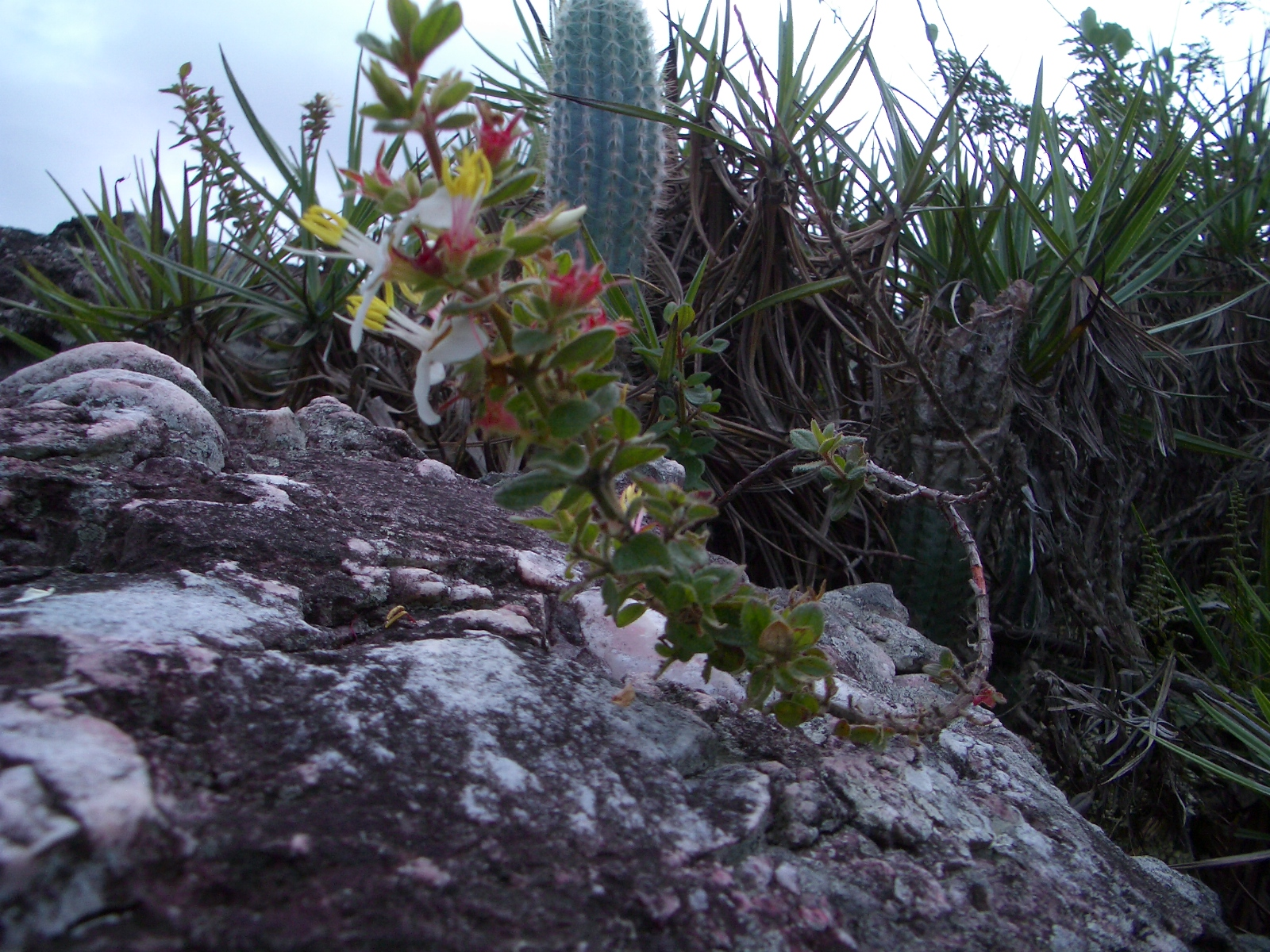
Typical flora of the Chapada Diamantina

Vegetation includes typical Caatinga xerophytic formations at elevations from about 500 to 900 metres (1,600 to 3,000 ft), Atlantic Forest vegetation along the watercourses, meadows, and rocky fields higher up. Endemic flora include Adamantinia miltonioides, Cattleya elongata, Cattleya tenuis, Cattleya x tenuata, Cleites libonni and Cleistes metallina. The hooded visorbearer (Augastes lumachellus) hummingbird is endemic. There are few large mammals, but many species of small mammals, reptiles, amphibians, birds, and insects.

== Conservation ==
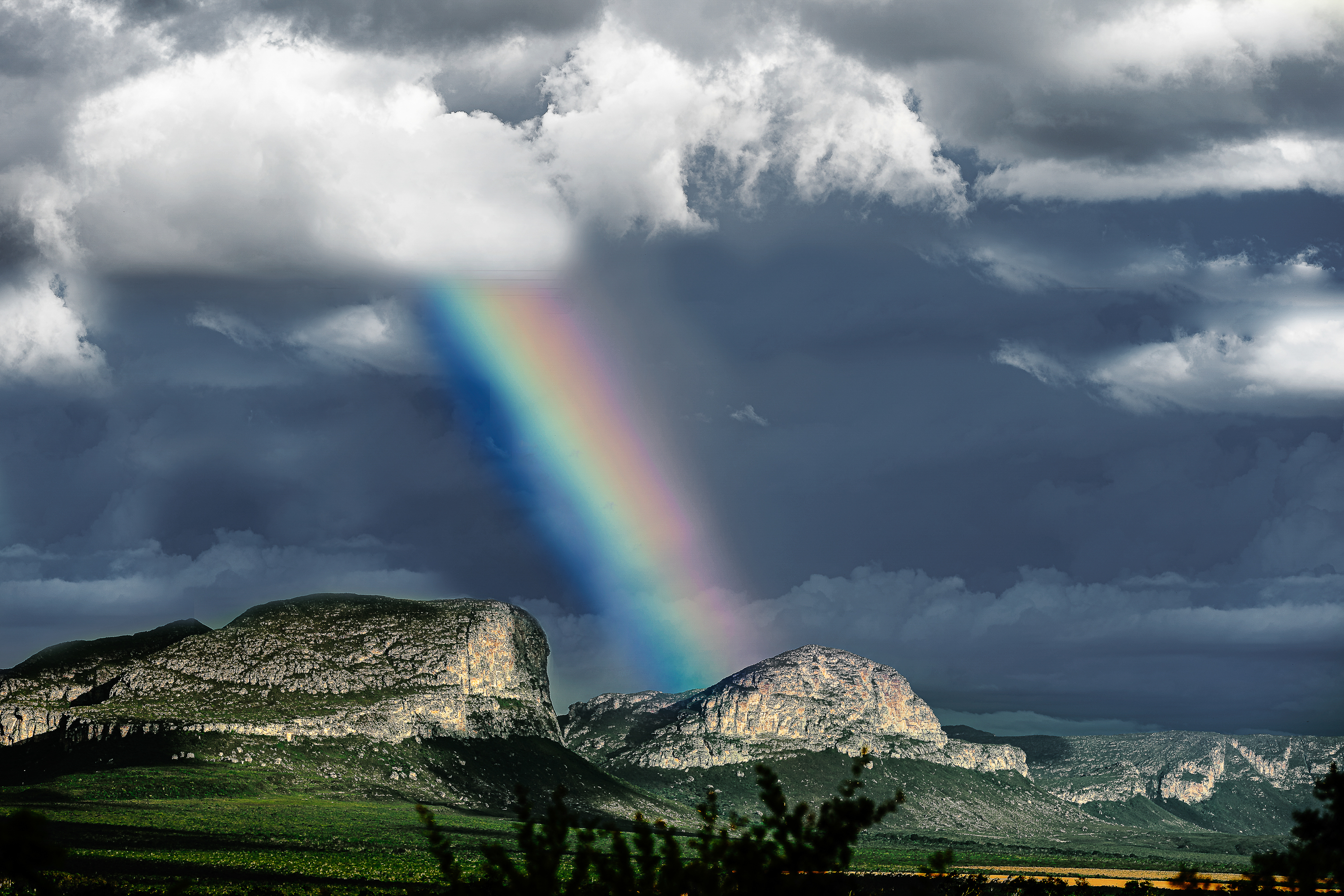
Rainbow in Chapada Diamentina National Park

The park is classed as IUCN protected area category II (national park). It has the objectives of preserving natural ecosystems of great ecological relevance and scenic beauty, enabling scientific research, environmental education, outdoors recreation and eco-tourism. Protected birds in the reserve include white-necked hawk (Buteogallus lacernulatus), Chaco eagle (Buteogallus coronatus), Bahia tyrannulet (Phylloscartes beckeri), ochre-marked parakeet (Pyrrhura cruentata) and Bahia spinetail (Synallaxis whitneyi).

Other protected species include Barbara Brown's titi (Callicebus barbarabrownae), cougar (Puma concolor), jaguar (Panthera onca), oncilla (Leopardus tigrinus), giant armadillo (Priodontes maximus) and giant anteater (Myrmecophaga tridactyla).
