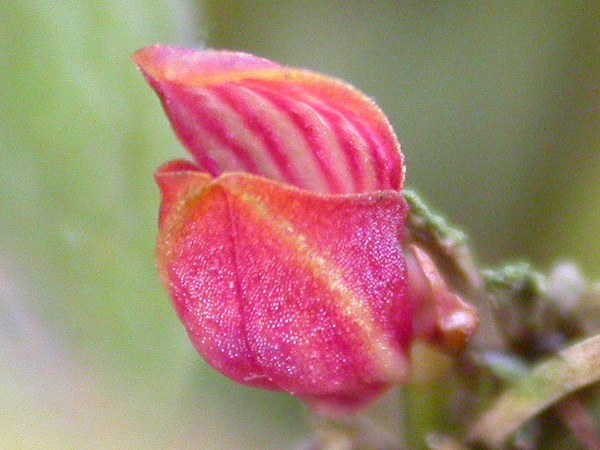

Scientific classification
- Kingdom: Plantae
- Clade: Tracheophytes
- Clade: Angiosperms
- Clade: Monocots
- Order: Asparagales
- Family: Orchidaceae
- Subfamily: Epidendroideae
- Genus: Acianthera
- Species: A. glanduligera

Binomial name
- Acianthera glanduligera (Lindl.) Luer (2004)

Synonyms
- Pleurothallis glanduligera Lindl. (1836) (Basionym); Pleurothallis cryptoceras Rchb.f. (1886); Humboldtia glanduligera (Lindl.) Kuntze (1891); Pleurothallis cearensis Schltr. (1921); Pleurothallis iguapensis Schltr. (1922); Pleurothallis altoserrana Hoehne (1929); Acianthera cearensis (Schltr.) Pridgeon & M.W. Chase (2001); Anathallis iguapensis (Schltr.) Pridgeon & M.W. Chase (2001); Acianthera cryptoceras (Rchb.f.) F. Barros (2003); Acianthera iguapensis (Schltr.) F. Barros (2004)

= Acianthera glanduligera =

Species of orchid

Acianthera glanduligera is a species of orchid.
