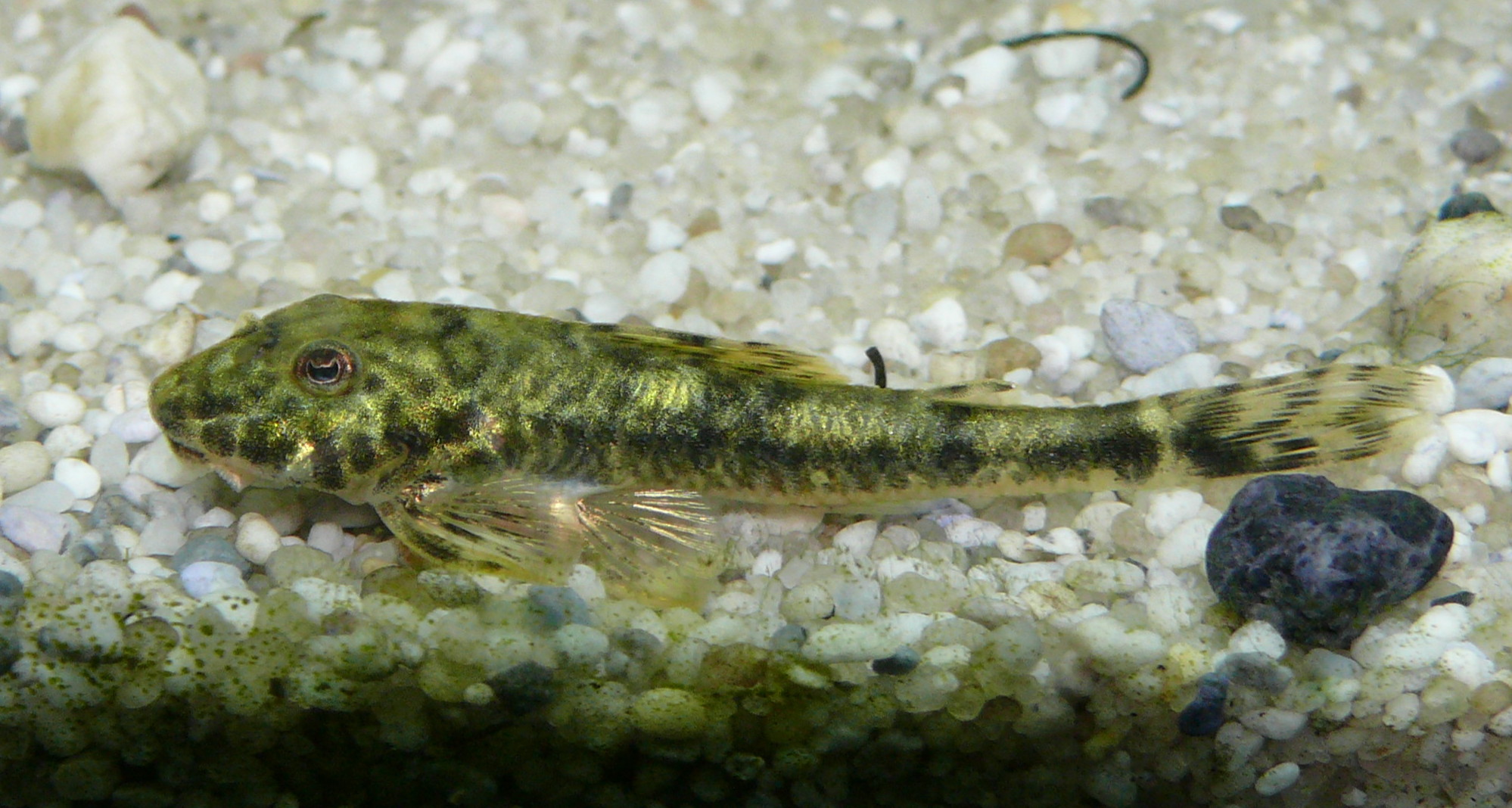
- Parotocinclus jumbo

Scientific classification
- Kingdom: Animalia
- Phylum: Chordata
- Class: Actinopterygii
- Order: Siluriformes
- Family: Loricariidae
- Subfamily: Hypoptopomatinae
- Genus: Parotocinclus; C. H. Eigenmann & R. S. Eigenmann, 1889

Type species
- Otocinclus maculicauda Steindachner, 1877

= Parotocinclus =

Genus of fishes

Parotocinclus is a genus of freshwater ray-finned fishes belonging to the family Loricariidae, the suckermouth armored catfishes, and the subfamily Hypoptopomatinae, the cascudinhos. The catfishes in this genus are found in South America.

== Taxonomy ==
Parotocinclus was first proposed as a subgenus of Hisonotus in 1889 by the German-American ichthyologist Carl H. Eigenmann and his ichthyologist wife Rosa Smith Eigenmann with Otocinclus maculicauda designated as its type species. O. maculicauda was originally described in 1877 by the Austrian ichthyologist Franz Steindachner with its type locality given as southeastern Brazil. Eschmeyer's Catalog of Fishes classifies this genus in the subfamily Hypoptopomatinae, the cascudinhos, within the suckermouth armored catfish family Loricariidae.

A parsimony analysis of morphological characters suggests that Parotocinclus is not a monophyletic genus, with P. jumbo and P. collinsae falling outside the group.

Based on analysis of both mitochondrial and nuclear markers, the P. collinsae cladistic group based in been transferred to Rhinotocinclus. P. jumbo may eventually be transferred also because it is not closely related to P. maculicauda, being a basal taxon in the Hypoptopomatinae. P. bidentatus and P. muriaensis form a monophyletic pair of sister taxa that is more closely related to a subset of species of Parotocinclus (which includes P. maculicauda) than to any other genus of the putative tribe Otothyrini.

== Species ==
Parotocinclus contains the following valid species:

- Parotocinclus adamanteus E. H. L. Pereira, A. Santos, de Pinna & Reis, 2019
- Parotocinclus arandai Sarmento-Soares, Lehmann A. & Martins-Pinheiro, 2009
- Parotocinclus bahiensis (A. Miranda-Ribeiro, 1918)
- Parotocinclus bidentatus Gauger & Buckup, 2005
- Parotocinclus cabessadecuia T. P. A. Ramos, S. M. Q. Lima & R. T. C. Ramos, 2017
- Parotocinclus cearensis Garavello, 1977
- Parotocinclus cesarpintoi P. Miranda Ribeiro, 1939
- Parotocinclus cristatus Garavello, 1977
- Parotocinclus doceanus (A. Miranda Ribeiro, 1918)
- Parotocinclus fluminense Roxo, Melo, G. S. C Silva & Oliveira, 2017
- Parotocinclus haroldoi Garavello, 1988
- Parotocinclus jacksoni T. P. A. Ramos, Lustosa-Costa, Barros-Neto & Barbosa, 2021
- Parotocinclus jacumirim Silva-Junior, T. P. A. Ramos & Zanata, 2020
- Parotocinclus jequi Lehmann A., Koech Braun, E. H. L. Pereira & Reis, 2013
- Parotocinclus jimi Garavello, 1977
- Parotocinclus jumbo Britski & Garavello, 2002
- Parotocinclus maculicauda (Steindachner, 1877)
- Parotocinclus minutus Garavello, 1977
- Parotocinclus muriaensis Gauger & Buckup, 2005
- Parotocinclus nandae Lehmann A., Camelier, & Zanata, 2020
- Parotocinclus planicauda Garavello & Britski, 2003
- Parotocinclus prata Ribeiro, Melo & E. H. L. Pereira, 2002
- Parotocinclus pukuixe Silva-Junior & Zanata, 2022
- Parotocinclus robustus Lehmann A. & Reis, 2012
- Parotocinclus seridoensis T. P. A. Ramos, Barros-Neto, Britski & S. M. Q. Lima, 2013
- Parotocinclus spilosoma (Fowler, 1941)
- Parotocinclus spilurus (Fowler, 1941)

== Etymology ==
Partotocinclus is a combination of para, meaning "near", and the genus Otocinclus, the genus the type species, P. maculicauda was originally thought to be a member of.

== Distribution ==
Parotocinclus is distributed through almost all hydrographic systems in South America from the Guyana Shield drainages and Amazon Shield tributaries to the coastal drainages of eastern and southeastern Brazil, including the rio São Francisco basin. Most species have the caudal peduncle oval in cross section.

== Ecology ==
It has been found that Characidium fish species may interact with P. maculicauda. The small Characidium will follow grazing P. maculicauda, which release particulate matter dislodged from the catfish's foraging.
