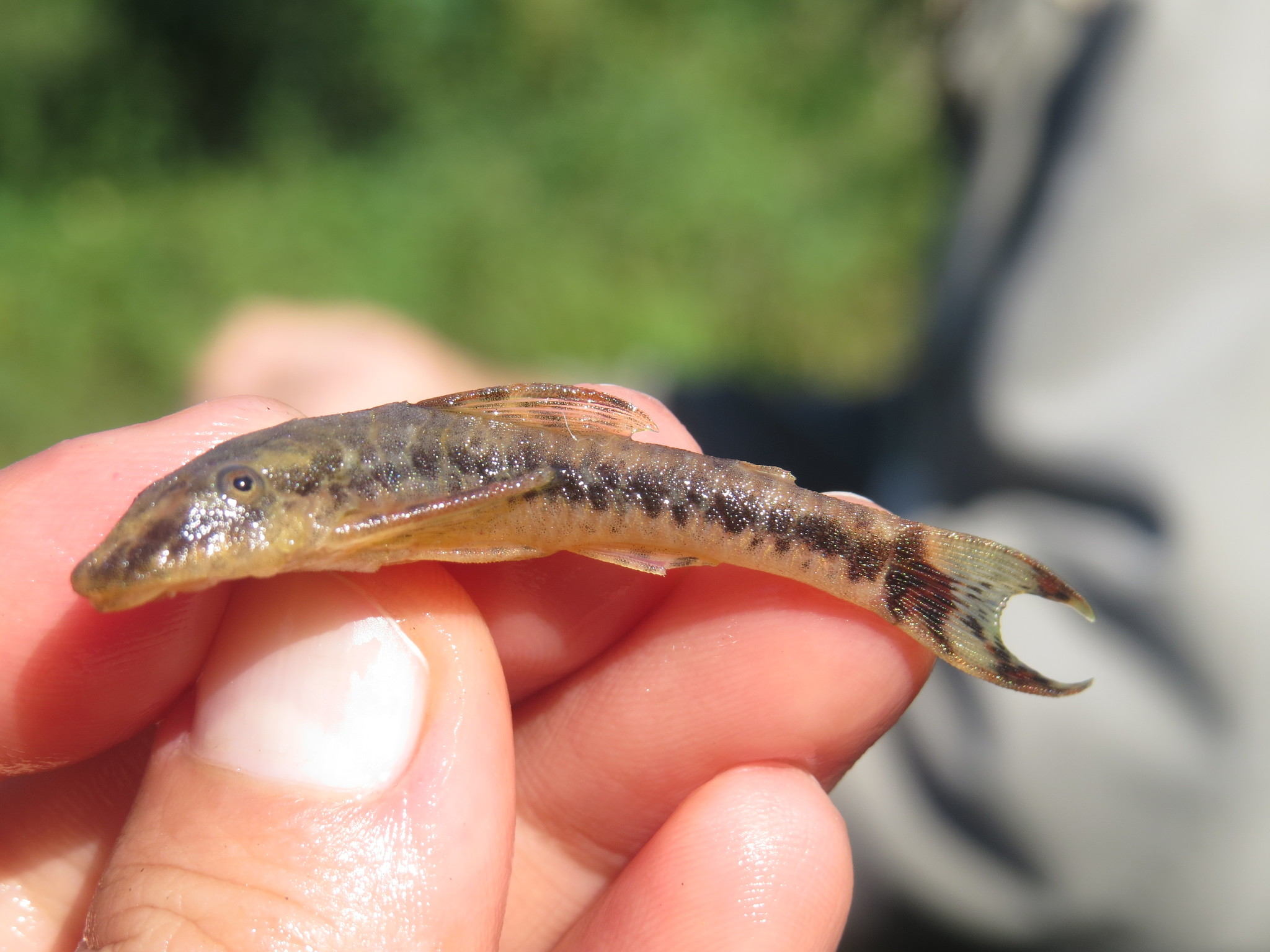

Conservation status
- Least Concern (IUCN 3.1)

Scientific classification
- Kingdom: Animalia
- Phylum: Chordata
- Class: Actinopterygii
- Order: Siluriformes
- Family: Loricariidae
- Genus: Parotocinclus
- Species: P. maculicauda

Binomial name
- Parotocinclus maculicauda (Steindachner, 1877)

Synonyms
- Otocinclus maculicauda Steindachner, 1877; Parotocinclus steindachneri Di Caporiacco, 1948

= Parotocinclus maculicauda =

Species of fish

Parotocinclus maculicauda is a species of freshwater ray-finned fish belonging to the family Loricariidae, the suckermouth armoured catfishes, and the subfamily Hypoptopomatinae, the cascudinhos. This catfish is endemic to Brazil.

== Taxonomy ==
Parotocinclus maculicauda was first formally described as Otocinclus maculicauda in 1877 by the Austrian ichthyologists Franz Steindachner with its type locality given as southeastern Brazil. In 1889 the German-American ichthyologist Carl H. Eigenmann and his ichthyologist wife Rosa Smith Eigenmann proposed a new subgenus of Hisonotus, Parotocinclus, with O. maculicauda as its only species, the type species by monotypy. Eschmeyer's Catalog of Fishes classifies the genus Parotocinclus in the subfamily Hypoptopomatinae, the cascudinhos, within the suckermouth armoured catfish family Loricariidae.

== Etymology ==
Parotocinclus maculicauda is the type species of the genus Parotocinclus, a name which is a combination of para, meaning "near", and the genus Otocinclus, the genus this species was originally thought to be a member of. The specific name, maculicaida, combines macula which means "spot", with cauda, meaning "tail", a reference to the sizeable spot at the front of the tail.

== Description ==
Parotocinclus maculicauda reaches a total length of .1 cm (0.039 in). This species has a horizontal band along its sides which ends in a large spot on the front of the tail.

== Distribution ==
Parotocinclus maculicauda is endemic to southeastern Brazil where it occurs in coastal rivers in the states of Rio de Janeiro, Santa Catarina, São Paulo, Espírito Santo, Minas Gerais and Paraná. This species is found in Atlantic Forest streams with clear water, rocks, logs and piles of dead leaves scattered over a sandy bed. P. maculicauda was mainly found in the middle part of the stream, in places with high water flow and hard substrates, such as rocks, logs, and branches.
