= List of caves in Brazil =

This is the List of caves in Brasil with links displayed alphabetically.

== Caves in Brazil ==
Name	Municipality	State	Depth (m)	Length (m)	Geology	Notes
Abismo Guy Collet	Barcelos	AM	671	-	Quartzite	Deepest abyss in South America
Buraco das Araras - GO		GO	105	-	Quartzite	
Buraco das Araras - MS		MS	127	500	Arenite	
Caverna de Santana		SP	61	7200	Limestone	Longest cave in the state of São Paulo
Caverna dos Ecos		GO	150	1725	Quartzite	A mica schist cave
Conjunto Santa Rita	Iraquara	BA	-	17050	Limestone	A complex of limestone caves
Poço Encantado	Itaetê	BA	60	-	-	Close to Chapada Diamantina National Park with a magical visual effect when sun rays fall into the water.
Poço Azul	Itaetê	BA	-	-	-	Close to Chapada Diamantina National Park
Lapa Doce	Iraquara	BA	-	-	-	North of Chapada Diamantina National Park
Conjunto São Mateus	São Domingos	GO	-	20500	Limestone	A complex of limestone caves
Gruta da Cabana	Iporanga	SP	74	4185	Limestone	Located inside the Alto Ribeira Tourist State Park (PETAR)
Gruta Canabrava	Santana	BA	-	5500	Limestone	A calcareous cave in the dry caatinga region
Caverna da Tapagem		SP	150	6237	Limestone	Also called Caverna do Diabo (Devil's Cave, Hurdle's Cave). The most visited cave in the state of São Paulo.
Areado Grande	Iporanga	SP	-	-	Limestone	A group of caves located inside the Alto Ribeira Tourist State Park (PETAR)
Gruta do Centenário		MG	481	4700	Quartzite	The second deepest abyss in Brazil located in the state of Minas Gerais.
Gruta do Janelão	Januária	MG	176	4747	Limestone	
Gruta do Padre	Santana	BA	125	16400	Limestone	The third longest cave in Brazil
Gruta de Maquiné	Cordisburgo	MG	18	650	Limestone	Considered the birthplace of Brazilian paleontology
Gruta Olhos d'Água		MG	-	9100	Limestone	The longest cave in the state of Minas Gerais
Gruta Rei do Mato	Sete Lagoas	MG	30	998	Limestone	Has infrastructure for tourism in its first 220 metres
Gruta de Ubajara		CE	-	1120	Limestone	Considered one of the most beautiful caves in Brazil. With tourism infrastructure
Gruta das Areias	Iporanga	SP	-	5565	Limestone	A complex of caverns
Lapa da Mangabeira		BA	40	3230	Limestone	The cave's first gallery is used as a catholic church
Lapa do Convento	Campo Formoso	BA	-	9300	Limestone	
Lapa do Salitre	Campo Formoso	BA	-	5670	Limestone	
Abismo Ouro Grosso	Iporanga	SP	192	110	Limestone	One of the most dangerous to explore in Brazil
Lapa Terra Ronca		GO	-	7500	Limestone	Part of one of the most important cave systems in Latin America.
Lapa dos Brejões	Chapada Diamantina	BA	-	7750	Limestone	
Gruta Casa de Pedra		SP	292	2930	Limestone	Has the biggest cave entrance in the world at 292 metres
Gruta da Morena		MG	-	4620	Limestone	It is one of the most beautiful caves in the state of Minas Gerais
Caverna Aroe Jari		MT	-	1550	Arenite	The longest arenite cave in Brazil
Toca da Barriguda		BA	61	35000	Limestone	Second longest cave in Brazil
Toca da Boa Vista		BA	-	114000	Limestone	Longest cave in the southern hemisphere
Gruta da Torrinha	Iraquara	BA	-	8300	Limestone	Considered the most beautiful cave in the State of Bahia

== Parks ==
- Parque da Cascata
- Chapada Diamantina National Park

== See also ==
- List of caves
- Speleology
