= Guy Christian Collet =

French explorer and spelunker in Brazil (1929–2004)

- Born: 17 January 1929; Nice, France
- Died: October 29, 2004 (aged 74–75); Brazil
- Occupations: Scientist, Explorer, Speleologist
- Organizations: Sociedade Brasileira de Espeleologia (SBE), LABSUB
- Known for: Founding Brazilian speleological societies; exploration and mapping of Brazilian caves
- Notable work: Glossário de Termos Espeleológicos

Guy Christian Collet (1929 – 29 October 2004) was a French scientist, explorer and spelunker who came to live in Brazil after World War II. In the karstic region along the Ribeira valley in the State of Sao Paulo he began the exploration for caverns and grottos, becoming later founder and chairman of two speleological societies of deep respectability in the field of speleology in the country. He did work in the areas of underground biology, archeology, nutrition techniques in caves, besides having published several books and reports on the subject.

== Biography ==
Collet began his speleological career in 1962. In 1964 he explored Gruta Casa de Pedra, where he first contacted Michel Le Bret and Pierre Martin. Collet and his friends traveled kilometers on the weekends to visit the caves in the route Caçapava–Iporanga. He mapped and explored the caves Pescaria, Chapéu, Gruta Casa de Pedra, Água Suja, Alambari, Arataca, Areias de Cima e de Baixo, Caverna de Santana, Gruta do Pierre, Bethary, Abismo da Paçoca and many others.

In 1969, he took part in the crossing of the Caverna do Diabo with Michel Le Bret, J. L. Bret and Valla. He was elected president of the SBE in November 1973. In 1974 he founded the first underground laboratory in South America called LABSUB. He was then accredited by IPHAN for archaeological research in several regions of Brazil. He participated in several speleological expeditions in the State of Goiás and Bahia between 1971 and 1973, mapping the Mangabeira Cave in Bahia along with other scientists, Lapa da Terra Ronca in Goias, São Matheus, São Vicente, Angélica, etc. He has authored numerous articles in magazines and the "Glossary of Speleological Terms", besides being a special lecturer at colleges, universities and conferences.

== See also ==
- Sigismund Ernst Richard Krone
- Peter Wilhelm Lund

== Books ==
- Collet, Guy Christian, Considerações sobre algumas peças líticas de "Pavão" (Itaoca, Apiai, SP), Departamento de arqueologia da SBE, Sao Paulo (1980), OCLC 25647459
- Collet, Guy Christian, Descrição e algumas medidas referentes as pontas de projeteis de Itaoca (Apiai, SP), Departamento de arqueologia da SBE, Sao Paulo (1980), OCLC 25829255
