= Gruta do Padre =

Coordinates: 14.48141°S 41.80849°W

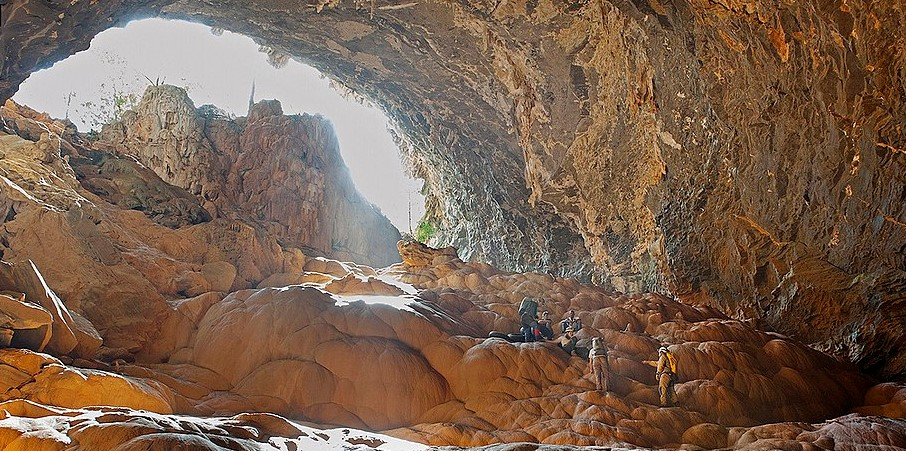

Gruta do Padre (BA-052) is a cave located halfway between the municipalities of Santana, Santa Maria da Vitória e Canápolis, in the state of Bahia, Brazil. It is currently the third-longest cave in the country being 16,400 meters long and unevenness of 125 meters. Discovered in 1914 by a priest who sought honey in hives that get stuck in the rocks, it was often a place of religious pilgrimage where the locals came to pay their promises until the 1950s.

The great hall of stalactites is located 50 meters deep and approximately 500 meters from the entrance of the cave. The pools of crystal blue waters draw attention because of the presence of calcite, a mineral found in limestones such as those found in this cave. So far there is no project for the preservation of the cave by governmental agencies, but those visiting the site recognizes the need to keep this natural treasure intact. Gruta do Padre was formerly known as Caverna Canabrava, a calcareous cave in the dry caatinga region, municipality of Santana, state of Bahia.

== See also ==
- List of caves in Brazil
