= Toca do Gonçalo =

Cave in Bahia, Brazil

Coordinates: 10°23′42″S 40°47′02″W

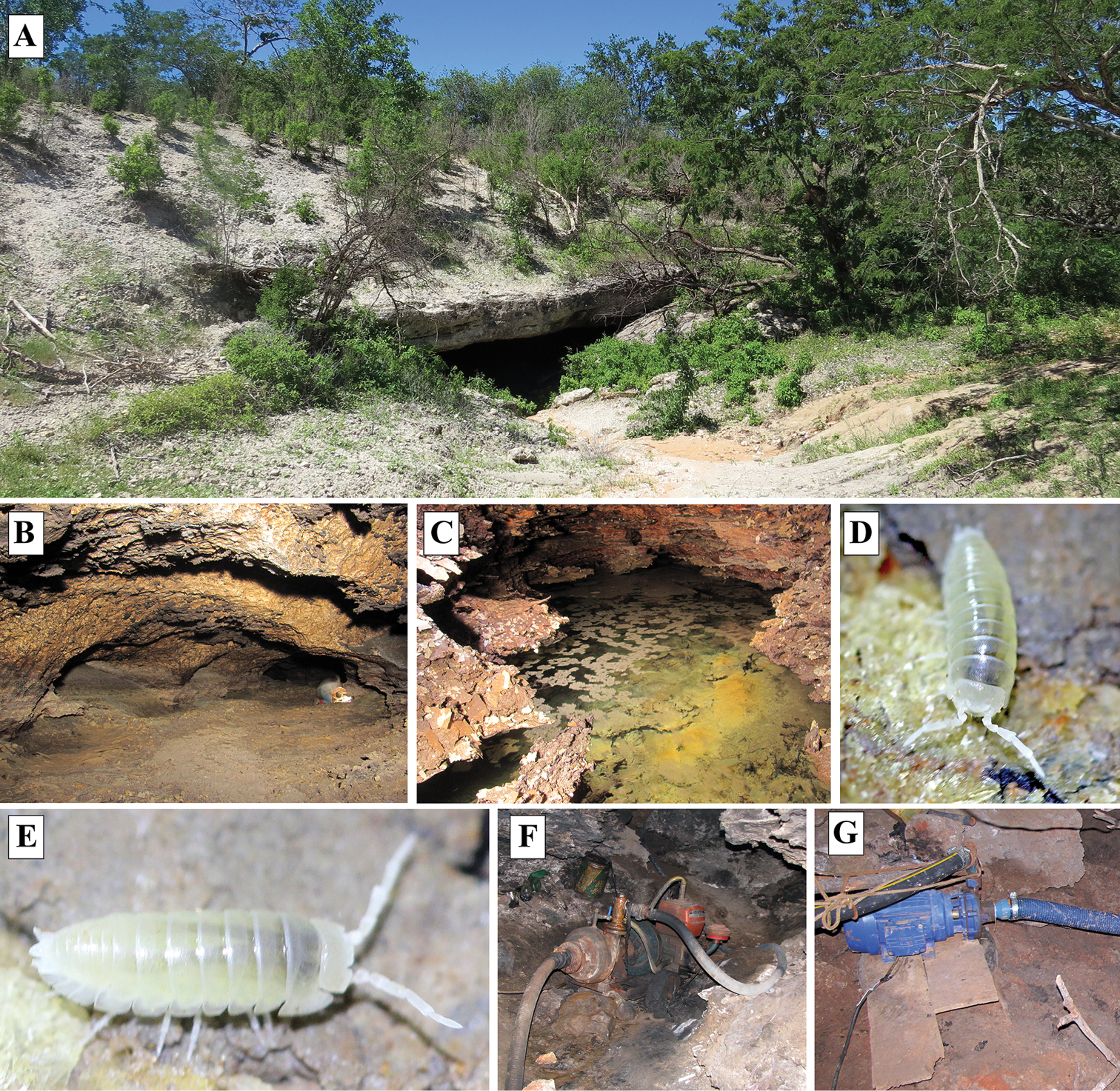

Toca do Gonçalo (English: "Gonzalo's lair") is a cave located in the municipality of Campo Formoso, in the Brazilian State of Bahia. It is part of the Chapada Diamantina mountain range and the Salitre River basin. Its biodiversity is of paramount importance due to its diversity. Some troglofauna are rare, such as a catfish.

== See also ==
- List of caves in Brazil
