= Toca da Barriguda =

Coordinates: 10.1407°S 40.8522°W

Toca da Barriguda (English: "Barriguda lair") (BA-0250) is a dolomite cave located in the municipality of Campo Formoso, in the Brazilian State of Bahia. It measures 35,000 meters long and 61 meters deep, and is now considered a branch of the Toca da Boa Vista cave, being the second-longest in South America. The Coarazuphium formoso, a recently described a troglobite species of beetle found in the Barriguda cave.

Inside Toca da Barriguda there are waterfalls, speleothems, stalactites, and stalagmites, rocks of shapes that point down towards the ground and rounded ones that go towards the ceiling of the cave. Together with Toca do Calor de Cima, Toca do Pitu, Toca do Morrinho, and Toca da Boa Vista, it is part of a group of caves of world-wide geological importance.

== See also ==
- List of caves in Brazil
