= Gruta Canabrava =

- Location within Brazil
- Location: Santana, Bahia, Brazil
- Coordinates: 12.3751°S 41.5714°W
- Length: 5,500 metres (18,000 ft)

Gruta Canabrava (BA-0261) is a limestone cave measuring 5,500 metres (18,000 ft) long, located near the municipality of Santana, in the State of Bahia, Brazil.

== See also ==
- List of caves in Brazil
