= Conjunto São Mateus =

Cave complex in Brazil

Coordinates: 13.6685°S 46.3671°W

Conjunto São Mateus (GO-011) is a complex of caves measuring 20500 meters long and considered until recently as the largest in Brazil, being replaced by the Toca da Boa Vista. It is located inside Terra Ronca State Park, in the speleologic district of São Domingos, State of Goiás. It is one of the richest in speleothems including the famous "Hall of the Pearls", where visitors should go barefoot to avoid the transposition of sediment. It houses the typical fauna of the caves, including the blind catfish. Inside the cave flows the São Mateus river, forming beaches and leaving successive halls along the way.

== See also ==
- List of caves in Brazil
