= Lapa do Salitre =

Coordinates: 12.2465°S 41.5142°W

Lapa do Salitre ("Saltpeter Cave"), also Lapa do Convento (Convent Cave), (BA-0166) is a limestone cave 5,670 meters long, near the municipality of Campo Formoso, in the state of Bahia, Brazil.

== See also ==
- List of caves in Brazil
