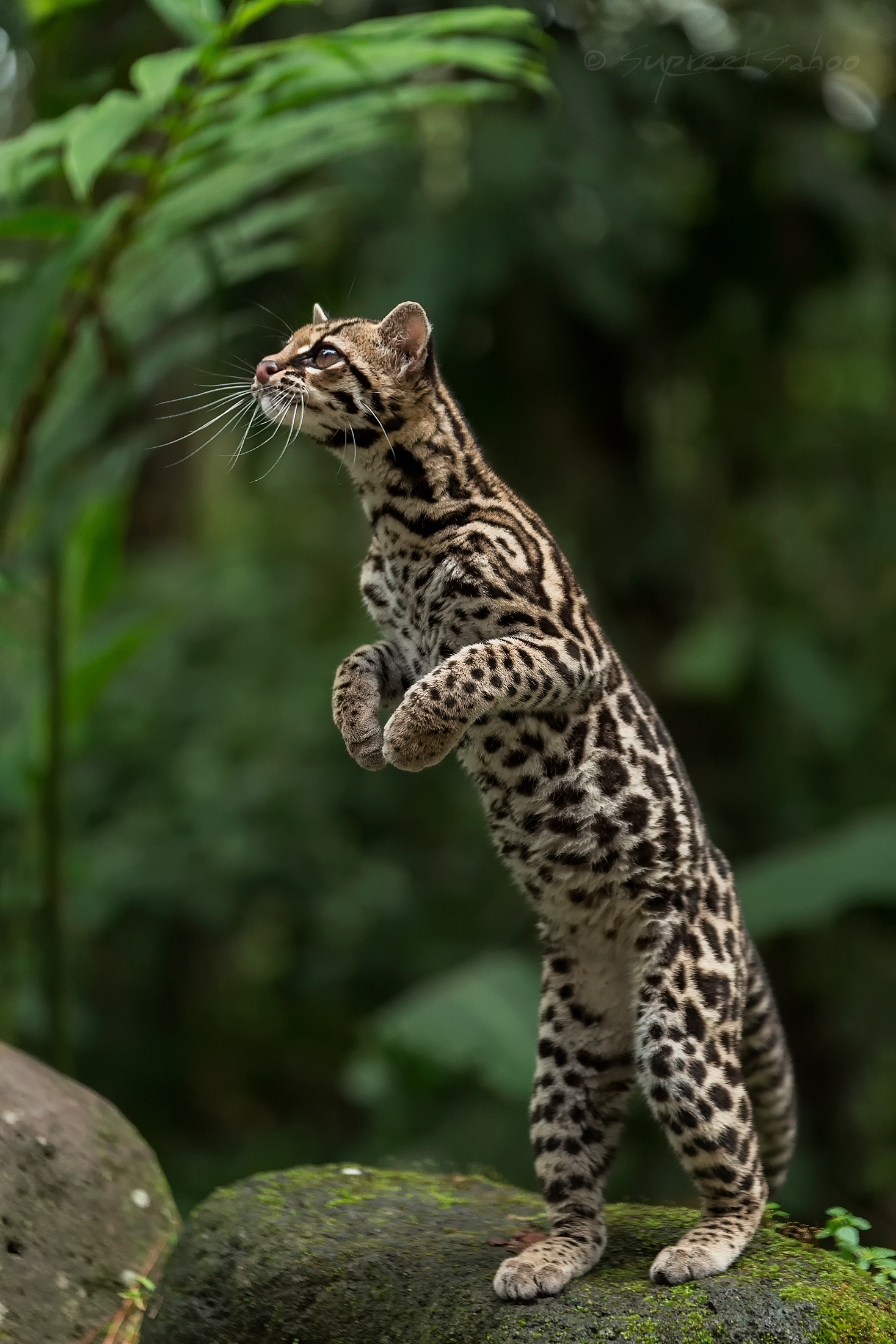
- Margay in Costa Rica

Conservation status
- Near Threatened (IUCN 3.1)
- CITES Appendix I

Scientific classification
- Kingdom: Animalia
- Phylum: Chordata
- Class: Mammalia
- Order: Carnivora
- Family: Felidae
- Genus: Leopardus
- Species: L. wiedii

Binomial name
- Leopardus wiedii (Schinz, 1821)

Subspecies
- L. w. wiedii (Schinz, 1821); L. w. vigens (Thomas, 1904); L. w. glauculus (Thomas, 1903)
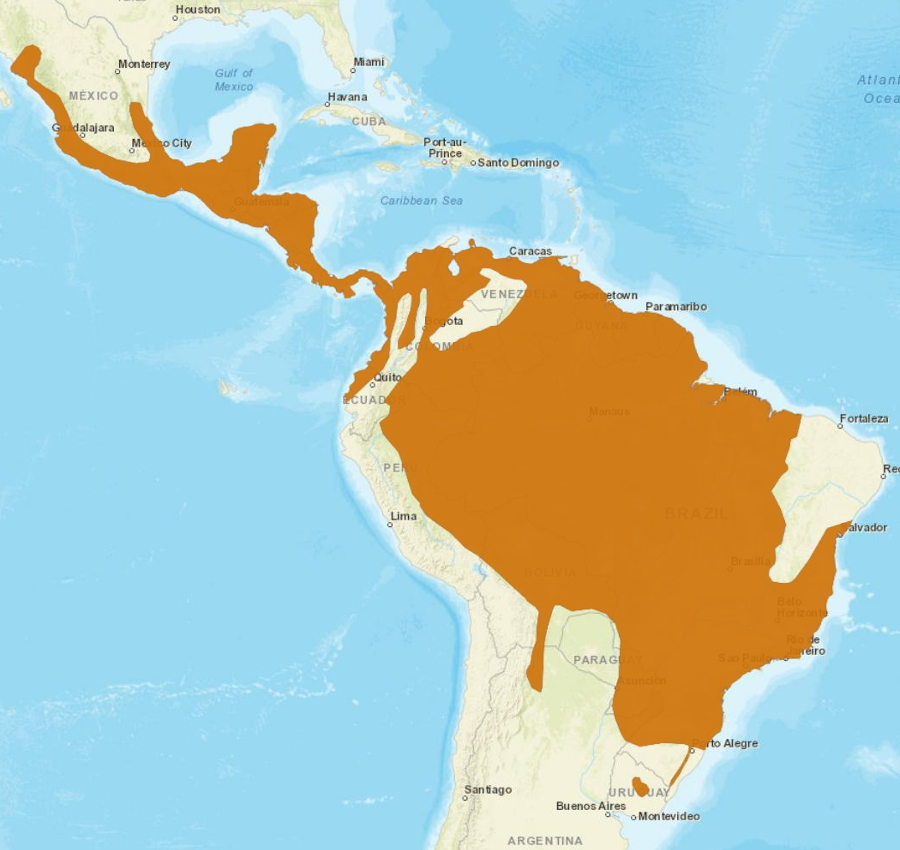
- Distribution of the margay, 2015

Synonyms
- Felis wiedii

= Margay =

Species of feline mammal

The margay (Leopardus wiedii) is a small wild cat native to Mexico, Central and South America. A solitary and nocturnal felid, it lives mainly in primary evergreen and deciduous forests. Until the 1990s, it was hunted for the wildlife trade. Since 2008, it has been listed as Near Threatened on the IUCN Red List, as the population is thought to be declining due to loss of habitat and deforestation.

The scientific name Felis wiedii was used by Heinrich Rudolf Schinz in 1821 in his first scientific description of the margay, named in honour of Prince Maximilian of Wied-Neuwied, who collected specimens in Brazil.

== Taxonomy ==
Felis wiedii was the scientific name proposed by Heinrich Rudolf Schinz in 1821 for a zoological specimen from Brazil. Felis macroura was proposed by Maximilian von Wied in 1825 who described margays that he obtained in the jungles along the Mucuri River in Brazil. In the 20th century, several type specimens were described and proposed as new species or subspecies:

- Felis glaucula by Oldfield Thomas in 1903 was an adult female cat skin and skull from Jalisco in central Mexico.
- Felis wiedii vigens by Thomas in 1904 was an adult male cat skin and skull from Igarapé-Assu near Pará in Brazil.
- Felis pirrensis by Edward Alphonso Goldman in 1914 was an adult female cat skin and skull from Cana in eastern Panama.
- Margay glaucula nicaraguae by Joel Asaph Allen in 1919 was an adult male cat skin and skull from Volcan de Chinandego in Nicaragua.
- Felis glaucula oaxacensis and F. g. yucatanicus by Edward William Nelson and Goldman in 1931 were an adult male skin and skull from Cerro San Felipe in Oaxaca, and a female cat skin from Yucatan, Mexico, respectively.
- Felis wiedii cooperi by Nelson in 1943 was a skin of a male cat from Eagle Pass, Texas.

Results of a genetic study of margay mitochondrial DNA samples indicate that three phylogeographic groups exist. Therefore, three subspecies are currently considered valid taxa:

- L. w. wiedii south of the Amazonas
- L. w. vigens north of the Amazonas
- L. w. glauculus in Central America

== Characteristics ==
Margay at La Senda Verde, Bolivia

The margay is very similar to the larger ocelot (Leopardus pardalis) in appearance, although the head is a little shorter, the eyes larger, and the tail and legs longer. It weighs from 2.6 to 4 kg (5.7 to 8.8 lb), with a body length of 48 to 79 cm (19 to 31 in) and a tail length of 33 to 51 cm (13 to 20 in). Unlike most other cats, the female possesses only two teats.

Its fur is brown and marked with numerous rows of dark brown or black rosettes and longitudinal streaks. The undersides are paler, ranging from buff to white, and the tail has numerous dark bands and a black tip. The backs of the ears are black with circular white markings in the center.

== Distribution and habitat ==
The margay is distributed from the tropical lowlands in Mexico through Central America to Brazil and Paraguay. In Mexico it has been recorded in 24 of the 32 states, ranging northward up the coastal lowlands and Sierra Madres as far north as of Coahuila, Nuevo Leon, and Tamaulipas on the US border in the east and southern Sonora in the west. The southern edge of its range reaches Uruguay and northern Argentina. It inhabits almost exclusively dense forests, ranging from tropical evergreen forest to tropical dry forest and high cloud forest. The margay has sometimes been observed in coffee and cocoa plantations.

The only record from the United States was collected sometime before 1852 near Eagle Pass, Maverick County, Texas, and it is currently considered locally extinct in Texas. The margay's presence in the United States is considered "uncertain" by the IUCN Red List.

== Fossil record ==
Fossilized margay remains have been collected from Pleistocene deposits in Orange County, Texas along the Sabine River; like the ocelot and jaguar, it is thought to have ranged over considerable portions of southern Texas at the time. Margay fossils dating to 45,475–46,157 BP are known from the Toca da Barriguda cave in Bahia, Brazil. Pleistocene remains of the margay were also found in Florida.

Pleistocene fossils of margay-like cats, dubbed Leopardus amnicola, have been found in Florida, Georgia and South Carolina, suggesting that they may have had an even wider distribution in prehistory.

== Behavior and ecology ==
Margay in captivity in the Bolivian Yungas

The margay is a skillful climber, and colloquially it is sometimes called the tree ocelot because of this ability. It spends most of the time in trees, leaping after and chasing birds and monkeys through the treetops. It can turn its ankles up to 180 degrees, so it can grasp branches equally well with its fore and hind paws, and it is able to jump up to 12 ft (3.7 m) horizontally. It also utilizes its long tail to maintain balance while climbing. Morphological adaptation such as these is a strong indication that the margay is well equipped to thrive in ecosystems such as rainforests in which vegetation provides the wild with protection from possible threats. Additionally, scientists who have conducted behavioral studies on margays found that population density was higher in environments with a substantial amount of trees and minimal human disturbance. It is usually solitary and lives in home ranges of 11–16 km^{2} (4.2–6.2 sq mi). It uses scent marking to indicate its territory, including urine spraying and leaving scratch marks on the ground or on branches. Its vocalisations all appear to be short range; it does not call over long distances.

=== Diet ===
Dietary studies (based on stomach-content and fecal analyses) have shown that the margay feeds on small primates (such as marmosets, tamarins, squirrel and titi monkeys), numerous birds and lizards (and their eggs and young), small snakes, tree frogs and arthropods. It also hunts arboreal mammals, including Ingram's squirrel, eats grass, as well as fruits and other vegetation, most likely to help digestion. It can live and hunt its prey entirely arboreally. However, margay will sometimes venture to the ground, and have been reported to hunt terrestrial prey, such as agoutis, armadillos, cavies, and paca.

=== Reproduction and lifecycle ===
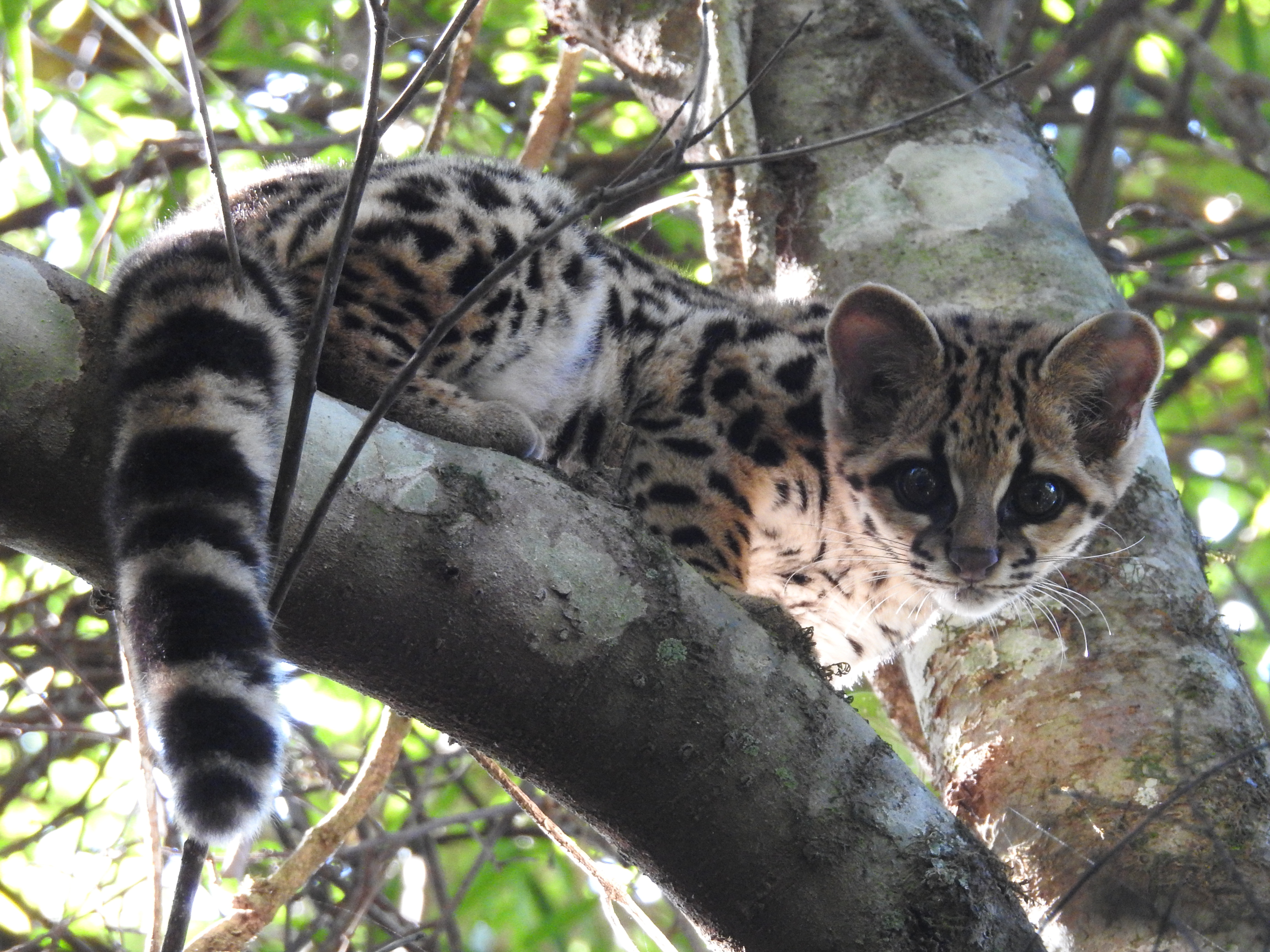
A margay photographed in Turvo State Park, Rio Grande do Sul, Brazil

Female margays are in estrus for four to ten days over a cycle of 32 to 36 days, during which they attract males with a long, moaning call. The male responds by yelping or making trilling sounds, and also by rapidly shaking his head from side to side, a behavior not seen in any other cat species. Copulation lasts up to sixty seconds and is similar to that of domestic cats; it takes place primarily in the trees and occurs several times while the female is in heat. Unlike other felids, margays are not induced ovulators.

Gestation lasts about 80 days and generally results in the birth of a single kitten (very rarely, there are two), usually between March and June. Kittens weigh 85 to 170 g (3.0 to 6.0 oz) at birth. This is relatively large for a small cat and is probably related to the long gestation period. The kittens open their eyes at around two weeks of age and begin to eat solid food at seven to eight weeks. Margays reach sexual maturity at twelve to eighteen months of age and have been reported to live more than 20 years in captivity.

A margay has been observed to mimic the vocalisation of a pied tamarin (Saguinus bicolor) infant while hunting. This represents the first observation of a Neotropical predator employing this type of mimicry.

== Conservation ==
The margay is listed Near Threatened and decreasing on the IUCN Red List. It is threatened by habitat fragmentation due to agricultural expansion.
