= Lapa do Convento =

Coordinates: 10.0493°S 40.7272°W

Lapa do Convento (BA-002) is a limestone cave measuring 9300 meters long, located in the municipality of Campo Formoso, in the State of Bahia, Brazil.

== See also ==
- List of caves in Brazil
