= Gruta da Morena =

Coordinates: 19.1691°S 44.3316°W

Gruta da Morena (MG-0270) is a limestone cave, considered the third largest cave in Minas Gerais, 15 km from Cordisburgo, Brazil. Reaching 4620 meters long, it presents five entrances, various halls and a stream. It is close to the road of Povoado do Onça, 6 km from the city. To get to the cave, it is first necessary to go through a trail. This specific cave has been very recently included in the area of influence of Gruta de Maquiné, once a new species of arachnid has also been found inside the cave, being it the third troglobitic species of Brazilian Palpigradi found in this cave and of characteristic very similar to the previous species Eukoenenia maquinenses.

== See also ==
- List of caves in Brazil
