= Warcursed =

Warcursed is a Brazilian death/thrash metal band that was formed in 2004 in Campina Grande, Paraíba, Brazil. The band's current line-up consists of vocalist/bassist Jean Sauvé, guitarists Richard Senko and Eduardo Victor and drummer Marsell Senko.

== History ==
=== Beginning and first album ===
Warcursed was formed in 2004 in Campina Grande, Paraíba, Brazil, initially as a Megadeth cover band, performing to modest audiences a few times in Campina Grande. The departure of then vocalist Henrique Melo and the initial writing of the first original songs brought up the desire to form an original band. The original line-up at that time consisted of Jean Sauvé (Bass), Richard Senko (Guitar) and Marsell Senko (Drums), as well as Alan Cruz (Guitar) and Glauber Ancelmo (Vocals). From 2004 to 2010, the quintet was called Post Mortem.

In 2006, still as Post Mortem, the band began recording their first demo, which would be called "Gates of War", but never actually reached the public. The early years were marked by line-up changes and several performances in João Pessoa and Campina Grande, as well as the first concerts outside of Paraíba, performing in Recife-PE and Juazeiro-BA.

In 2010, the band settled, now including Eduardo Victor on guitar and Jean Sauvé also assuming the position of lead singer of the group, then becoming a quartet, after the departure of original members Alan Cruz and Glauber Ancelmo, for personal reasons.

Around that time, the band dropped the name Post Mortem, favouring a name that would relate to the group only, and adopted the name Warcursed.

More experienced and solid, in 2011 Warcursed returned to the stage, performing throughout the Northeast region of Brazil, and also began recording their first album, Escape From Nightmare. Lyrical themes are focused on social problems involving war, religion, insanity and existential problems, shown through a fusion of death and thrash metal.

The Escape From Nightmare record was released independently, in 2012, and the band toured extensively, playing several festivals like Grito Rock (Feira de Santana/BA, Salvador/BA, Vitória da Conquista/BA, João Pessoa/PB), Festival Mundo (João Pessoa/PB), Palco do Rock (Salvador-BA), Rock Cordel (Sousa/PB, Teresina/PI, Vitória da Conquista/BA), Festival Dosol (Mossoró/RN), Encontro da Nova Consciência (Campina Grande/PB) and Titans of Metal (Teresina/PI). The “Escape from Nightmare” Tour saw the widespread recognition of public and critical acclaim.

The album marked the technical evolution of its members, in addition to bringing to the group the feeling of doing something that could be recognized as an important contribution to Brazilian Heavy Metal, representing the Northeast and Brazil in the heavy metal scene around the globe.

== Escape From Nightmare (2012) ==
Produced by Victor Hugo Targino, Andrei Targino and Warcursed.
Drums recorded at Peixe-Boi Studio, Brazil, by Marcelo Macedo and Paulo "Tazz".
Guitars and Basses recorded at 1404 Studio, Brazil, by Andrei and Victor Hugo Targino.
Vocals recorded at H2 Studio, Brazil, by Artur Ferraz.
Mixing and mastering by Victor Hugo Targino at 1404 Studio.

Track list:

1. Deadline
2. Escape From Nightmare
3. Sandstorm
4. Iron Bird
5. Gates Of War
6. Eye Of Judgement
7. Spectral Whisper

== The Last March (2013) ==
Produced by Victor Hugo Targino and Warcursed.
Drums recorded at SG Studio, Brazil, by Sérgio Gallo.
Guitars and Basses recorded at 1404 Studio, Brazil, by Victor Hugo Targino.
Vocals recorded at H2 Studio, Brazil, by Artur Ferraz.
Mixing and mastering by Victor Hugo Targino at 1404 Studio.

Track list:

1. Superior Tyranny
2. The Last March
3. K.I.Y,
4. Renegades From Hell
5. Deathmachine
6. Symptoms of Decay
7. Temple of Destruction
8. Legacy of Violence

== Members ==
Current members

Luciano Miranda – bass, vocals (2014 –)
Richard Senko – guitar (2004 –)
Eduardo Victor – guitar (2011 –)
Marsell Senko – drums (2004 –)

Past members

Glauber Ancelmo – vocals (2004–2006)
Alan Farias Cruz – guitar (2004–2011)
Jean Philippe Sauvé – bass, vocals (2004–2014)
