= Hermann Krone =

German photographer (1827–1916)

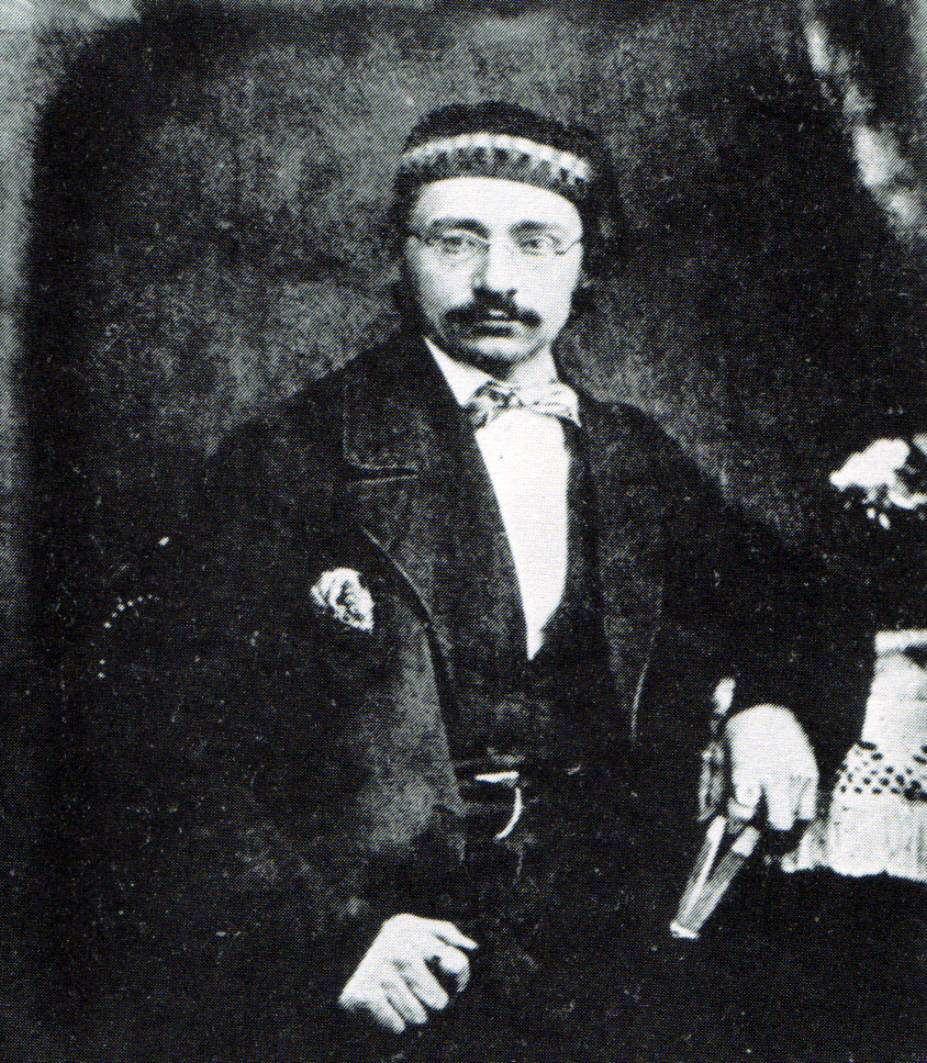
Self-portrait, circa 1850

Hermann Krone (14 September 1827 – 17 September 1916) was a photographer from Saxony, Germany, who was born in Breslau. His father was a lithographer and he began an apprenticeship with him 1843. He produced his first calotype and daguerreotype photographs in 1843. He opened a studio in Leipzig in 1851 and in Dresden from 1852. He took landscape photographs of Saxon Switzerland. He married Clementine Blochmann and had four children including Sigismund Ernst Richard Krone.

In 1855 he contributed to the collodion dry-plate process by bathing them iodine-bromide to produce a high silver bromide content, and coating with resin. In 1869 he established a publishing house. In 1872 he completed a photo book with views of 142 cities in the Kingdom of Saxony. He went on a journey to the Auckland Islands in 1874 to observe the passage of Venus in front of the sun and returned home via Australia and India. He published a compilation of his poetry in four volumes between 1899 and 1902. He also published The Standard Photographic Methods Retaining their Practical Value Forever (Die für alle Zeit von praktischem Wert bleibenden Photographischen Urmethoden) and established a museum of photography. In 1916 he died in Laubegast near Dresden.

Krone is commemorated by a tablet at Bastei where he who took the first landscape photographs at the Bastei Bridge in 1853. The M-1306 Hermann Krone (Kriegsmarine), an auxiliary minesweeper, was sunk during World War II. It struck a mine and sank in the Skaggerak off Hanstholm, Denmark.

== Gallery ==
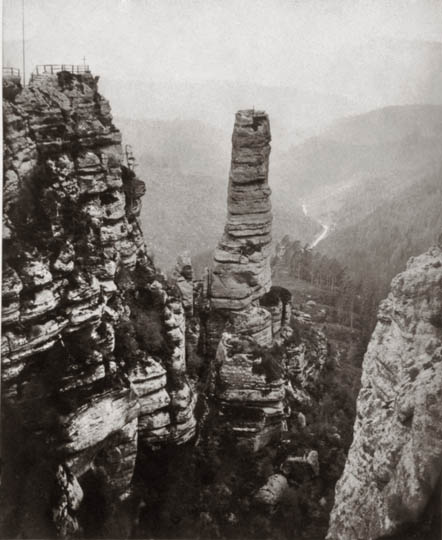
"Malý pravčický kužel" (1853)

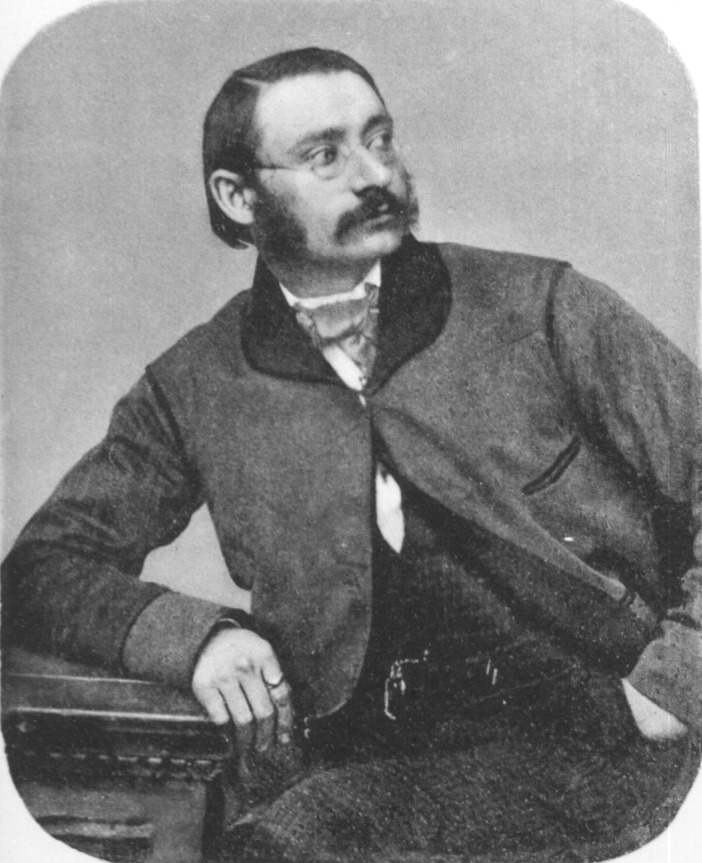
Self-portrait, circa 1854

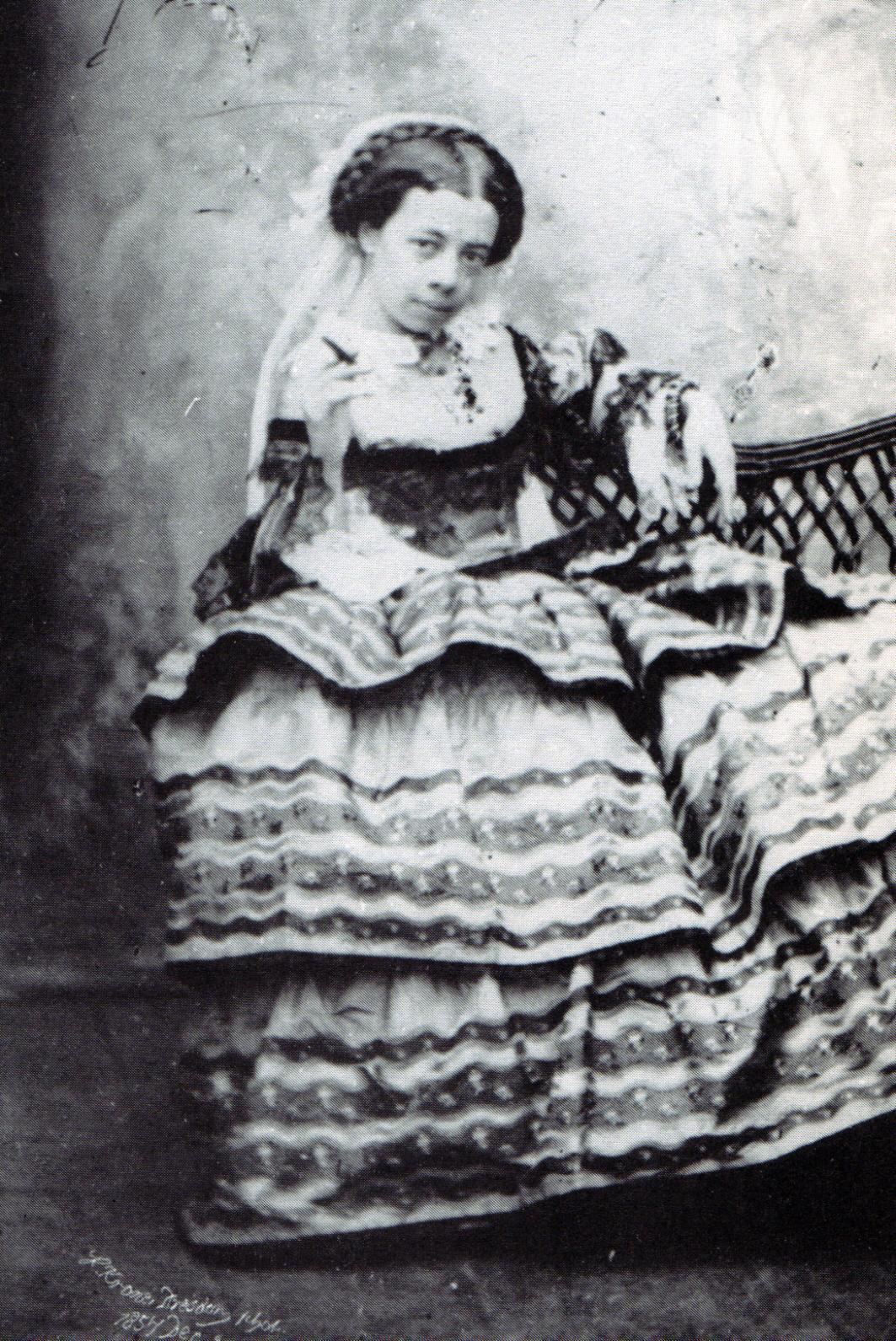
Daguerreotype of Princess Pauline von Metternich (1854) by Hermann Krone

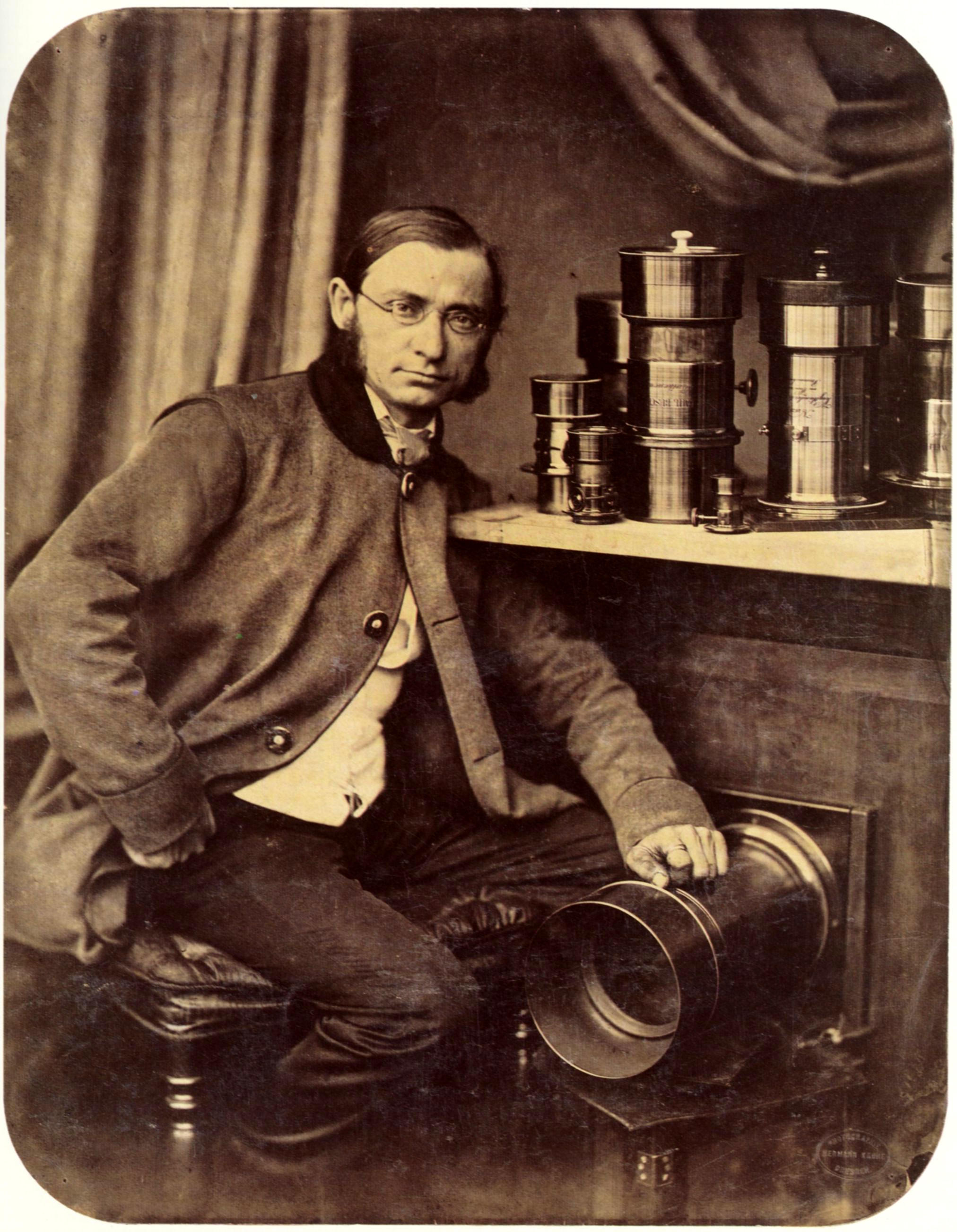
Self-portrait with camera equipment, circa 1858

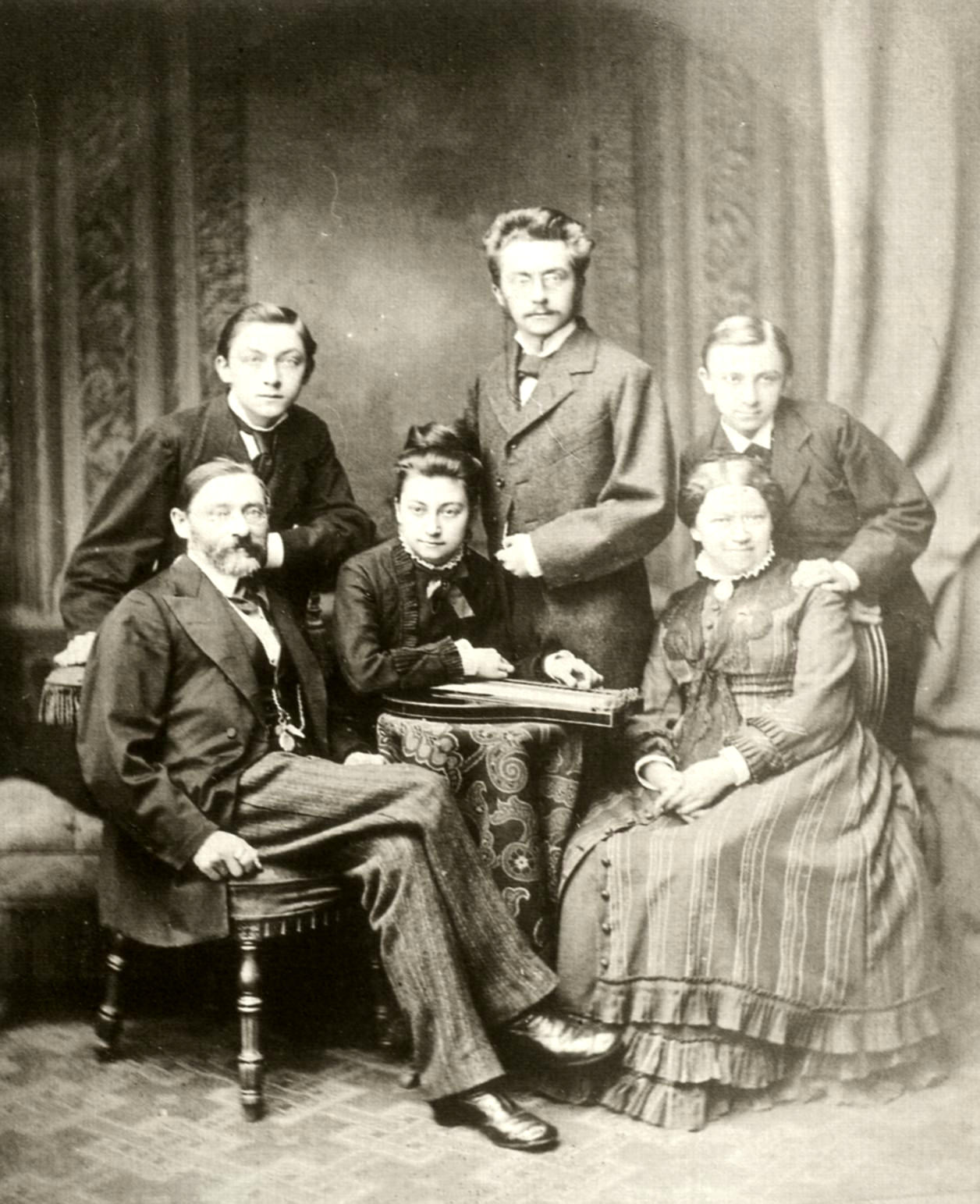
Krone and his family in 1875
