= Gruta Casa de Pedra =

Cave in Brazil

Coordinates: 24.2846°S 48.3523°W

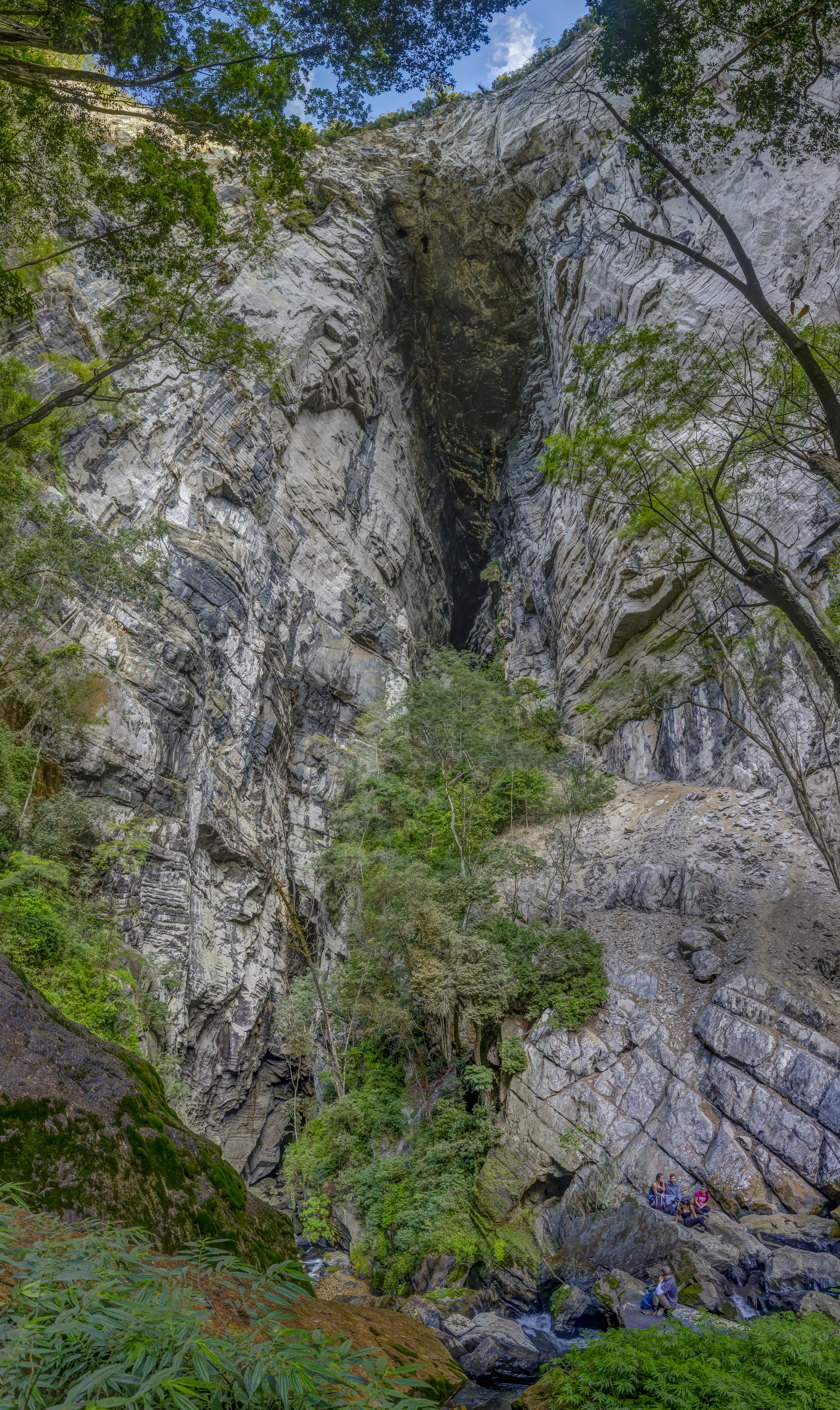
Gruta Casa de Pedra cave mouth

Gruta Casa de Pedra (SP-009) is a cave located in the karstic region of the Alto Ribeira Tourist State Park, between the municipalities of Apiaí and Iporanga, to the south of the State of Sao Paulo, Brazil. It is 2,930 meters long and features the largest cave mouth in the world, measuring 172 meters high. It is located in the final portion of the hydrographic sub-basin of the Maximiano stream which enters the cave for about 800 meters and flows into the Iporanga River. Its name derives from the size of its portico, recognized as the world's largest.

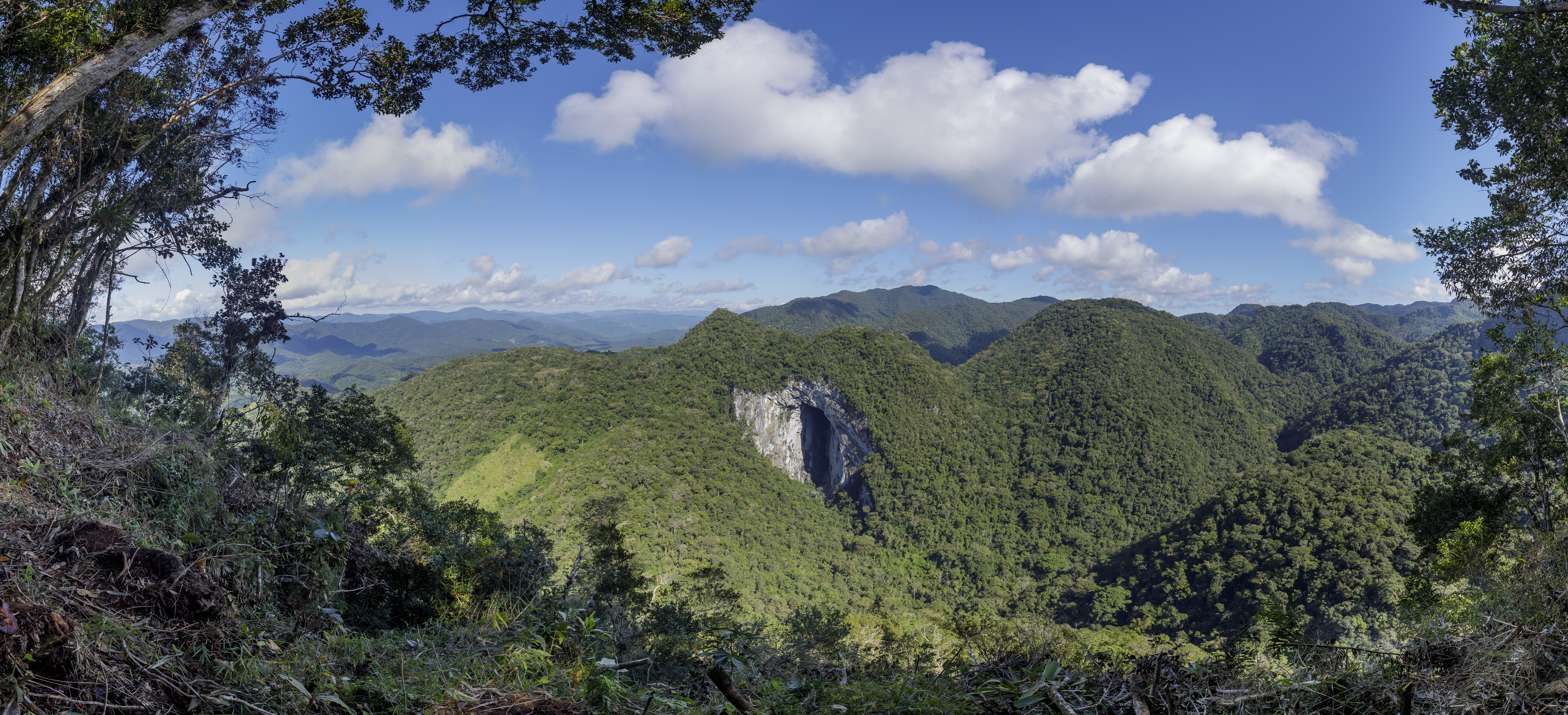
Gruta Casa de Pedra from a viewpoint

== Geology ==
In accordance with measurements performed from the 1960s, but contrary to the allegation that the actual size of the entrance of the cave is 215 meters high, Gruta Casa de Pedra is part of a technical survey containing further details on the Ribeira valley cave system which will be published as soon as data from other Brazilian caves are finalized. By means of a range finder and a cyclometer, other measurements were taken in the cave for the elaboration of a detailed cross-sectional profile of the cave entrance, which revealed that Gruta Casa de Pedra's cave mouth is 172 meters high, there being a recalto on the roof of the entrance that causes the height to reach up to 175 meters, making it the largest cave mouth in the world.

It has a great linear extent of 5,547 meters mapped among galleries and unevenness of 292 meters. With two entrance points, Santo Antonio, located within the nucleus Casa de Pedra which does not present risk for the tourists, and the other through the nucleus Caboclos. The first leads to the Krone Wall, which measures about 220 meters high, and then on to the Krone Hall, a huge gallery which presents some features of incrusted limestones, such as foliation, and a set of foldings of tectonic origin. Nearby, along the limestone wall where the mouth of the cave is located, there is a rocky shelter of reduced dimensions called Maximiano, which was excavated by Guy Christian Collet in the 1970s. Together with the Santo Antonio entrance they form a set of rare beauty along with roughage underground river waterfalls in addition to swimming trails along the route which leads to the end of one of the already mapped areas where part of the roof of the gallery collapsed.

== See also ==
- List of caves in Brazil
