= Poço Encantado =

Cave in Brazil

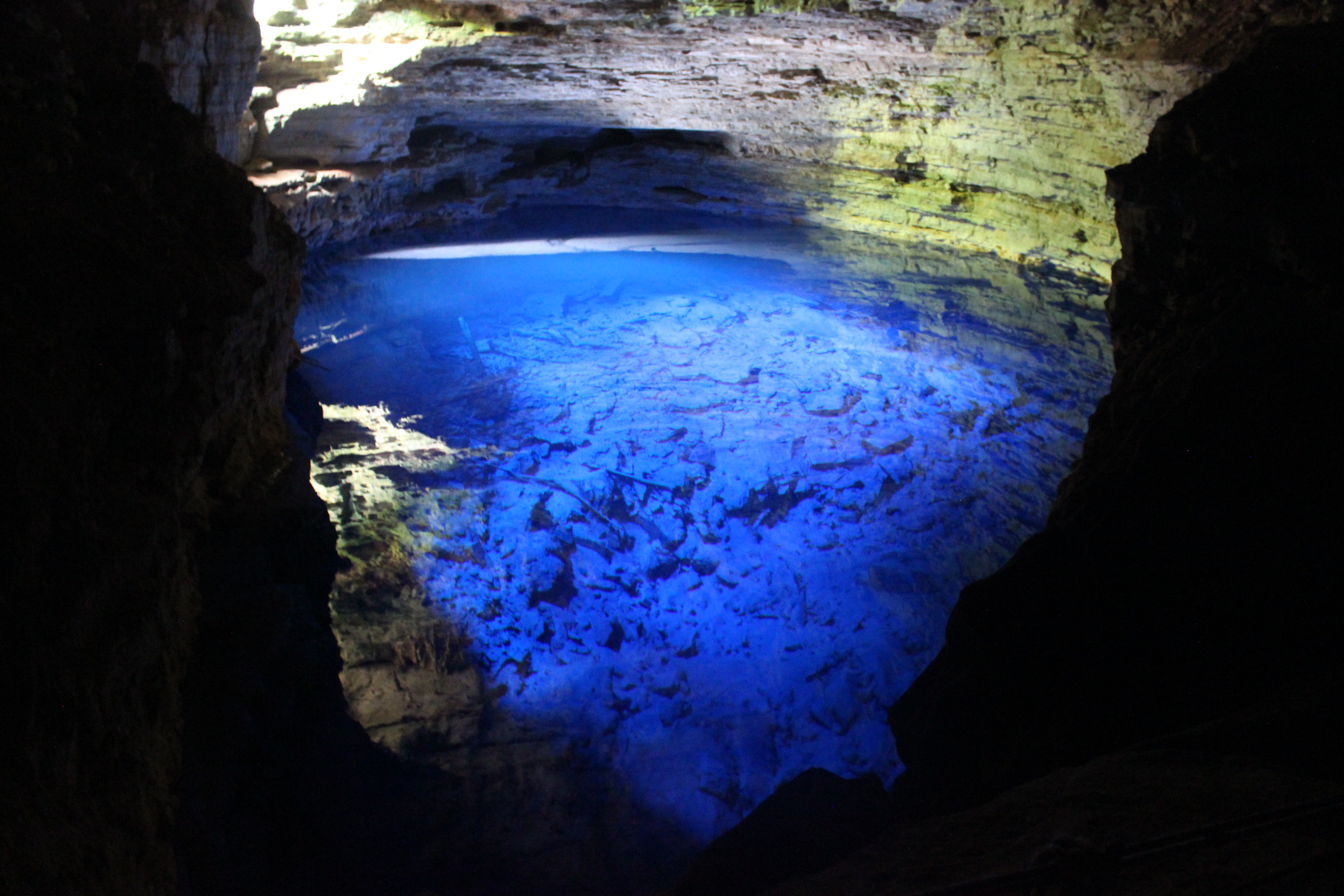
- Interior of Poço Encantado

- Location within Brazil
- Location: near Chapada Diamantina, village of Andarai, Brazil
- Coordinates: 12°56′41″S 41°06′18″W

Poço Encantado is a cave located near the Chapada Diamantina National Park.

== See also ==
- List of caves in Brazil
