= Caverna dos Ecos =

Cave in Goiás, Brazil

Coordinates: 15°59′37″S 48°25′59″W

Caverna dos Ecos (GO-018), also called "Gruta dos Ecos" (English: Echo Cave), is a mica schist cavern in central Goiás, Brazil. It is located between Cocalzinho de Goiás and Brasília, 134 km from Goiânia. It is near the settlement of Girassol, just after the boundary with the Federal District.

== Geology ==
It was discovered in March 1975 and is 1,380 meters long with a descent of 142 meters deep. The entrance is located at an elevation of 1050 meters. It contains a lake formed by rain water called Lago dos Ecos, the largest subterranean lake in South America, which is approximately 300 meters long, 50 wide and between 10 and 15 meters deep, being one of the longest in the world. It is formed by mica and schist, which explains the absence of speleothems.

Caverna dos Ecos is a remarkable subterranean karstic feature as no other Brazilian cave of similar size is known from similar lithologies, mica schist, quartzite, and marble, with 70% of its volume developed in schists and quartzite. This cave, a geological curiosity, developed originally in limestone, but migrated to overlying mica-schists due to breakdown. Visits can only be made with an experienced guide.

== See also ==
- List of caves in Brazil
