= Caverna Aroe Jari =

Cave in Brazil

Coordinates: 15.3626°S 55.2930°W

Aroe Jari (MT-0038), meaning Soul Shelter in Bororo language, also called Frenchman Cave, is the largest sandstone cavern in Brazil, located 46 km from the town of Chapada dos Guimarães, inside the area of Fazenda Agua Fria, north of the state of Mato Grosso. It is 1550 meters long, extremely flat and has numerous waterfalls. Near the entrance, there is a stream which formed the Blue Lagoon, a natural swimming pool with crystal blue water that is reflected on the walls of the cave.

== Geology ==
It occurs in the formations of Alto Garças e Vila Maria (Grupo Rio Ivaí of caves) and is formed in siliclastic sedimentary rock of ordovício-silurian age, in the Paraná Basin. The first scientific reports may be attributed to Ramis Bucair spelunker who have visited the cave in the early 1970s. In 1989 the cave was included as part of the "Plano de Reordenamento da Ocupacao da Chapada" created by FEMA - Fundacao Estadual do Meio Ambiente. The region was considered an environmental preservation area by decree nr. 99556/90. Other caves in the area are Caverna do Lago Azul, Caverna Kiogo Brado.

== See also ==
- List of caves in Brazil
