= Gruta Rei do Mato =

Cave in Brazil

- Cave of the Forest King
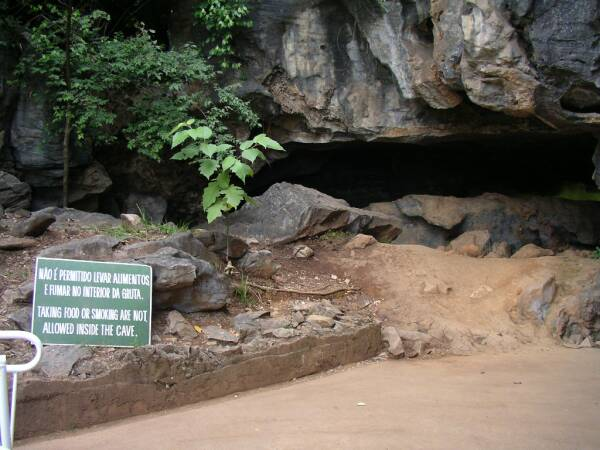
- Entrance to the caves

- location in Brazil
- 19°29′44″S 44°17′1.6″W
- Location: near Sete Lagoas, Minas Gerais
- Region: Brazil

The Gruta Rei do Mato (MG-3653) is a cave located at the edge of the BR-040 highway, close to the off ramp to the city of Sete Lagoas, in Minas Gerais, Brazil. From Sete Lagoas the cave can easily be reached by bus, taxi or car. Sete Lagoas is 70 km (43.5 mi) from Belo Horizonte, the capital of the state.

== Name ==
Gruta Rei do Mato means "Cave of the Forest King" in Portuguese. The name divides into Gruta (cave) and Rei do Mato (Forest King). According to several local sources, the "Rei do Mato" was a fugitive in either the Gruta Rei do Mato or another cave in the vicinity. According to the authors of Dona Brasil, he lived in a hut near the grotto.

== Geology ==
The limestone area north of Belo Horizonte is called the Sete Lagoas Formation, in which the Lagoa Santa Karst developed. The area around Sete Lagoas has many cave systems, of which the Gruta Rei do Mato is the most widely known. The cave has four large chambers with numerous stalactites, stalagmites, and rimstone dams. In the "Rarities Hall" are nearly identical parallel columns, formed by the calcium carbonate crystals of calcite. These columns are more than 20 m (66 ft) high and 20 m (66 ft) in diameter.

In the nearby Parque da Cascata is a collapsed karst crater which can be recognised by some stalactites that are oriented horizontally as a result of the collapse. In a small cave next to the Gruta Rei do Mato, 4,000-to-6,000-year-old cave paintings were discovered, as well as skeletal remains of the Xenorhinotherium bahiense, an extinct Pleistocene mammal. A replica of this animal can be found in the cave.

== See also ==
- List of caves in Brazil
