= Sigismund Ernst Richard Krone =

German naturalist

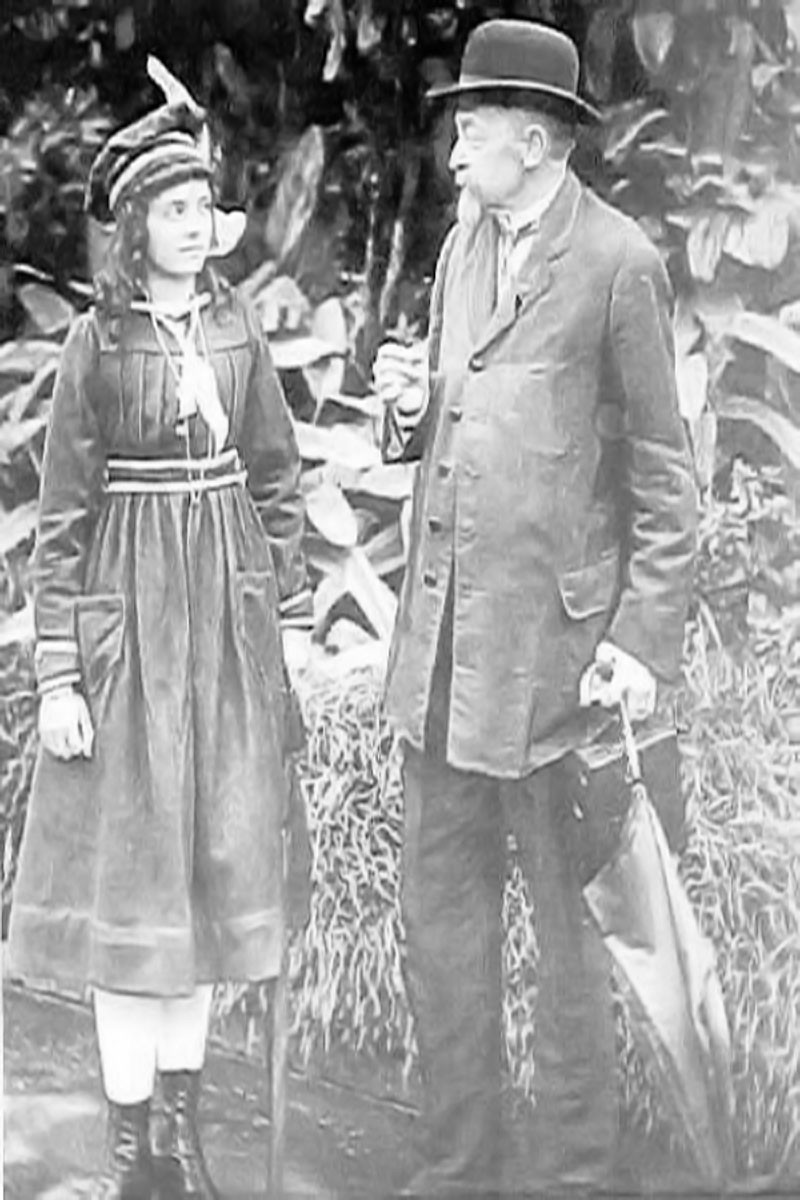
- Richard Krone with his daughter Ana Maria Martins Krone (after marriage).
- Born: 18 July 1861; Dresden
- Died: 9 September 1917 (aged 56); Iguape
- Resting place: 24.6975°S 47.5709°W
- Occupation: Naturalist
- Spouse: Thomázia Martins
- Children: 3

Sigismund Ernst Richard Krone was a German naturalist, zoologist, spelunker, archaeologist and researcher born on 18 June 1861 in Dresden, Kingdom of Saxony. Having been the discoverer of the Devil's Cave in 1891, he explored and studied the endokarst region of southeast Brazil. He was influenced by the contributions of the Danish naturalist Peter Lund (1801–1880), leading to the realization of several paleontological and archaeological discoveries in 41 of Iporanga's caves, which he examined between 1895 and 1906.

== Life ==
He was a descendant of a local traditional Saxony family. His father was Hermann Krone and his mother, Clementine Blochmann, was lieutenant of the Dresden Technical School. He began to study pharmacy in 1877, graduating in 1880. During this period, he also graduated in engineering. At the age 19, he joined the German navy and went on journey to several countries, arriving in the municipality of Iguape, Brazil, in 1884. where he worked as pharmacist, portrait painter, archaeologist, paleontologist, ornithologist, in addition to serving in a public office in the city.

Among the works in which he engaged, there is the construction of the railway Sorocaba, where he served as engineer. At the docks in the harbor of Iguape, he worked as surveyor for a major agricultural company. He then established himself as a pharmacist founding his Farmacia Popular, gaining thus the esteem of the entire population and projecting himself in the local society. He and his wife, Thomázia Martins, had two children: Ernesto and Ana Maria. He was also the father of artist Olavo de Almeida. He lived in Iguape for 30 years, dying on 9 September 1917 to be buried in the municipal cemetery of the city.

== Discoveries ==
Krone was the discoverer of the famous Iporanga-blind catfish, which was named Pimelodella kronei, a troglobitic fish species unique to the waters of some caves in the region and somewhat of Brazilian speleology. He also found the Casa de Pedra cave, whose portico of approximately 216 meters is one of the largest in the world.

By 1906, when searching the sambaqui (Tupi: Tamba'ki = pile of shells) Morro Grande, situated between Rio das Pedras and Rio Comprido located within the Juréia Ecological Reserve, Krone found a very curious stone statue known in scientific circles as the Iguape Idol. He believed that this piece of stone would have been carved by some indigenous people in the Andes, ending up in the sambaqui after a long immigration. Its age was estimated between 5,000 and 25,000 years through radiocarbon dating method.

== Literary works ==
Richard Krone was part of scientific societies of Europe and the US, having written several works on the Iguape middens and the pre-historic caves of the Ribeira de Iguape River valley.

- Krone, Richard: Exploração do Rio Ribeira de Iguape, Comissão Geograficáfica e Geológica (1914)
- Krone, Richard: As Grutas Calcárias de Iporanga (1898)

== See also ==
- List of caves in Brazil
