= Abismo Ouro Grosso =

Natural cave in Iporanga, Brazil

Coordinates: 24.5446°S 48.6795°W

Abismo Ouro Grosso (English: Thick Gold) (SP-054), also Gruta Ouro Grosso, is a 192-metre-deep (630 ft) shaft consisting of waterfalls and natural pools. It was created by the capture of surface rivers by carbonate rocks with subterranean drainage systems in an advanced stage of evolution. First explored by the German naturalist and spelunker Michel Le Bret in the 1970s, it is located at the Nucleo Ouro Grosso, within the borders of the Alto Ribeira Tourist State Park, in the municipality of Iporanga, 350 kilometres (220 mi) from São Paulo, Brazil.

== See also ==
- List of caves in Brazil
