= Areado Grande =

Caves in Iporqanga, São Paulo state, Brazil

Coordinates: 13.6685°S 46.3671°W

Areado Grande is the name given to a group of limestone caves located inside the Alto Ribeira Tourist State Park, in the municipality of Iporanga in the state of São Paulo, Brazil. It consists of Areado Grande I (SP-077), Areado Grande II (SP-078) being 3400 meters long, Areado Grande III (SP-510) with 6004 linear meters, Areado Grande IV (SP-524), Areado Grande V (SP-525). Other caves in the region of the Areado Grande creek are Toca da Pedra Inclinada, Gruta do Toboga, Gruta do Jeep (SP-086), Gruta da Fenda (SP-087), Gruta do Baixao (SP-088), and Gruta da Cabana (SP-108).

== See also ==
- List of caves in Brazil
