= Lapa da Mangabeira =

Coordinates: 13.8395°S 41.3154°W

Lapa da Mangabeira (MG-003) is a cave located in the municipality of Ituaçu, Chapada Diamantina, in the State of Bahia, Brazil. Presenting a horizontal projection of 3230 meters and unevenness of 40 meters, being one of the most important pilgrimage centers in the State of Minas Gerais.

== Pilgrimage ==
As traditional as the pilgrimage to the sanctuary of Bom Jesus da Lapa, the pilgrimage to Lapa da Mangabeira moves approximately 100,000 people a year to the city of Ituaçu, Brazil. Inside the cave several chapels have been erected for saints such as St. Gaspar, St. Anthony, Our Lady of Grace, Our Lady of Aparecida and the main altar to the Sacred Heart of Jesus. The access to the cave is through a staircase of 99 steps in total.

== See also ==
- List of caves in Brazil
