= Gruta da Cabana =

Coordinates: 24.2207°S 48.3307°W

Gruta da Cabana (SP-108) is a limestone cave located inside the Alto Ribeira Tourist State Park, in the municipality of Apiaí, São Paulo, Brazil. Although under the protection influence of the other caves along the Areado Grande creek, the cave lies outside the borders of the park. It measures 4185 meters long and 74 meters deep. Recent studies proved that the cave is connected to Gruta Desmoronada (SP-74) through a test conducted by a group of geologists.

== See also ==
- List of caves in Brazil
