= Gruta Olhos d'Água =

Coordinates: 15.1167°S 44.1667°W

Gruta Olhos d'Água (MG-0288) is a 9,100 meter-long cave located in the municipality of Itacarambi, State of Minas Gerais, Brazil. It is considered the fourth longest in Brazil and contains many limestone formations reaching up to 1 km long. The cave is 1180 m wide in its main axis and is formed by rocks of the pre-cambrian age, belonging to the Açungui Group of caverns frequently used for extraction of marble, limestone, talc, lead, and iron. Its fauna consists of bats and spiders, as well as depigmented crickets.

== See also ==
- List of caves in Brazil
