= Lapa dos Brejões =

Coordinates: 11.0121°S 41.4336°W

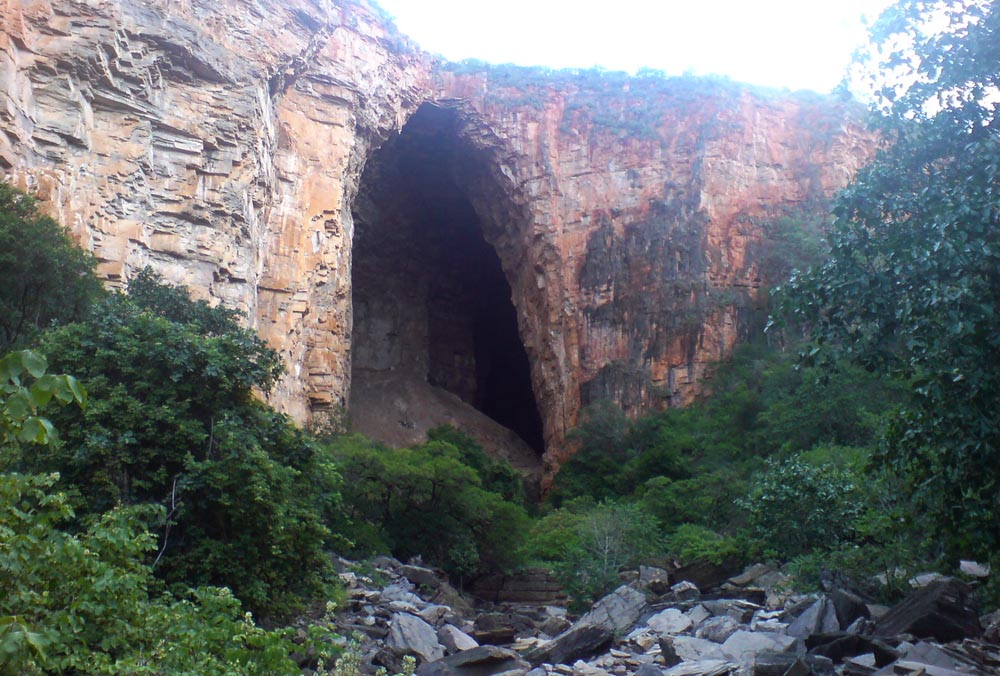
The cave of Brejões

Lapa dos Brejões is a complex of caverns formed in Neoproterozoic limestones of the Una Group of caves (Salitre formation) along the Jacaré river, northeast side of the Irecê sedimentary basin. It is located in the northern portion of the Chapada Diamantina - Polígono das Secas, in the north central part of the state of Bahia, about 500 km (310 mi) from the capital Salvador, in Brazil. According to local people, the Lapa dos Brejões was discovered in 1877, and the first discoveries inside the cave were published in 1938

.

== Geology ==
Lapa dos Brejões is one of the most remarkable group of caves in Brazil by the large amplitude of its galleries, halls, skylights, speleothems and its main entrance portico with 106 meters (348 ft) in height. A collapsed portion called karst canyon divides the cave into two segments, Brejões I and Brejões II, which together sum 7,750 meters (25,430 ft). Along the canyon one find shelter under the rocks and cave paintings of some sites.

Brejões I (BA-001) is made up of two major sub-parallel main galleries that have up to 80 meters (260 ft) high and 150 meters (490 ft) wide. It is the main part with 6,570 meters (21,560 ft) of large galleries where the speleothems and the most striking morphological features are concentrated, including two giant collapsed dolines as skylights. Their features are cylindrical with their base wider than the top that reach 100 meters (330 ft) in diameter, occupied by large piles of blocks of rock and huge pillars anchored to the walls.

Brejões II (BA-083) is 1,180 meters (3,870 ft) meters long and presents several galleries. The Jacaré river, which went through a hole 300 meters before the main entrance, re-appears inside the cave after the initial 750 meters (2,460 ft), and again inside Lapa dos Brejões II, until it finally comes up 300 meters (980 ft) outside the main entrance to the cave. The Racekiela cavernicula (Porifera:Demospongiae), of the genus Racekiela, is now a new species of cave freshwater sponge first recorded in Brazil.

== See also ==
- List of caves in Brazil
