= Gruta de Maquiné =

Cave in Brazil

Coordinates: 19°7′31″S 44°21′10″W

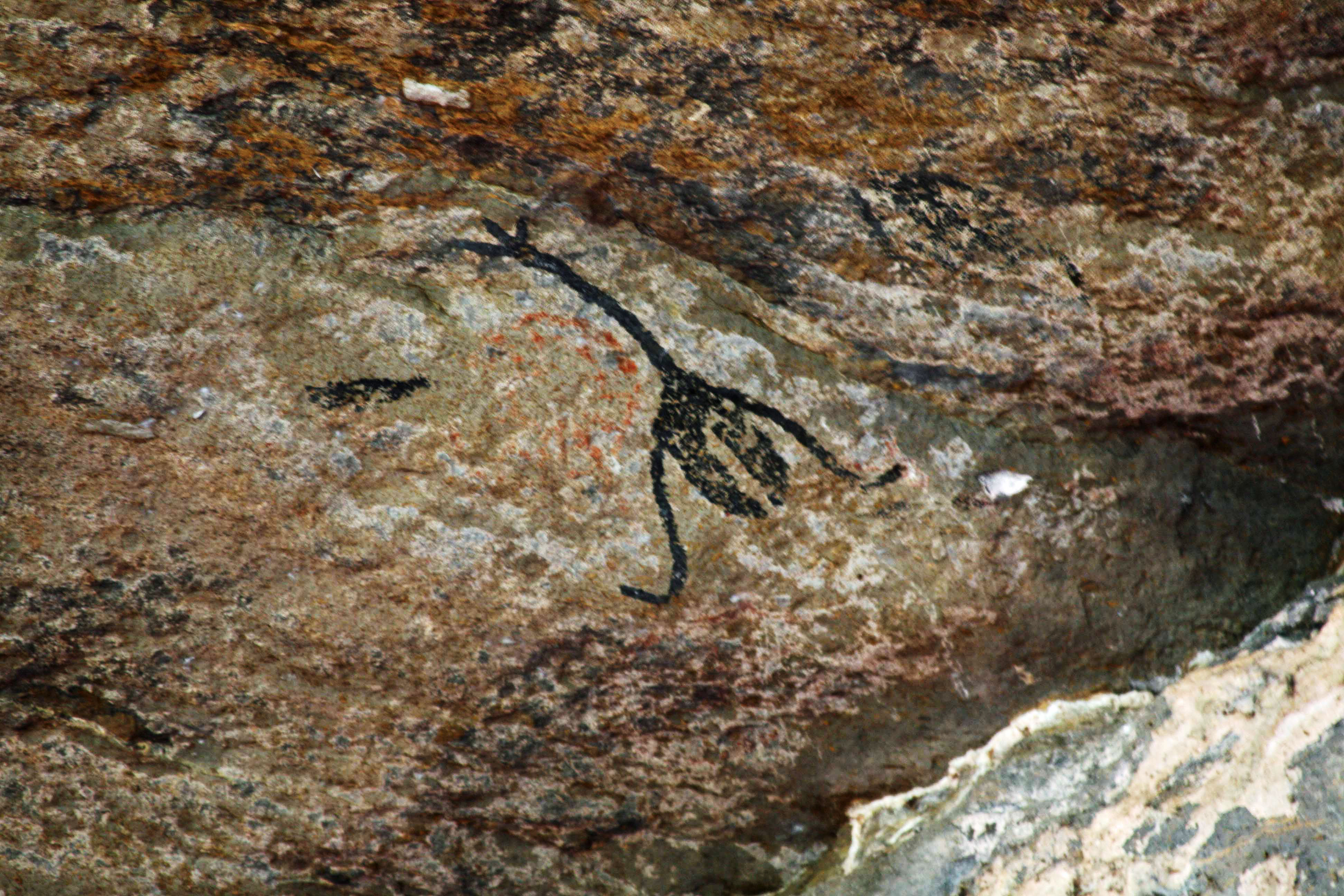
- Cave painting found in one of the chambers inside of Gruta de Maquiné
- Interactive map of Gruta de Maquiné
- Location: Minas Gerais, Brazil
- Depth: 18
- Length: 650
- Discovery: 1825
- Geology: Limestone
- Access: MG 231
- Website: Gruta de Maquiné

Gruta de Maquiné (MG-0243) (English: Maquiné Grotto), also Lapa Nova de Maquiné, is the oldest and one of the most commercially visited cave systems in Brazil. It is located about 5 km (3.1 mi) from Cordisburgo and 143 km (88.9 mi) northwest of Belo Horizonte, in the State of Minas Gerais. The network has seven chambers with a total length of 650 m (2,130 ft) (linear) and unevenness of the ground of only 18 m (59 ft). Safety measures like lighting, walkways and handrails are in place, and experienced local guides are available.

== Description ==
=== Geography ===
Maquiné faces north, with a portico shaped in the form of a shallow arch with width of approximately 18 m (59 ft) and height of only 8 m (26 ft). The main axis of the cave system runs north to south, 438.91 m (1,440.0 ft) long at its greatest extent. With an internal temperature ranging from 26 to 27 °C (79 to 81 °F), it is essentially horizontal, forming a continuous gallery with an average width of 9 to 12 m (30 to 39 ft) and height of 15 to 18 m (49 to 59 ft). The main compositional substance is calcium carbonate, with other minerals such as silica, gypsum, quartz and iron also present.

=== Morphology ===
The grotto features wide halls and a variety of speleothematic structures, and it likely accommodated a considerable volume of water in the past.

- First chamber, called "Vestibulo" ("Entrance Hall"), is fully illuminated by the natural light coming from the entrance of the cave. It measures 27 m (89 ft) in length, 20 m (66 ft) in width and contains numerous stalagmites that rise from the ground. The most distant of them are heaped in a single group that rises up to the upper dome, forming a back wall where two large blocks of quartz detach from the huge layer of the same mineral.
- Second Chamber, called "Sala das Colunas" ("Room of Columns"), is 37 m (121 ft) long by 22.5 m (74 ft) width. Masses of stalagmites that rise up to the dome link this wall to that which separates the preceding chamber. Other masses have risen as the first, leaving only a descent. The layer of stalagmites here formed was punctured so that the nitrogenous component contained therein might be extracted. This layer contains a large quantity of small bones and teeth.
- Third chamber, called "Altar" or "Trono" ("Altar", or "Throne"), is 67 m (220 ft) long, 35 m (115 ft) wide and 15 m (49 ft) high. A group of stalagmites which separates this chamber from the preceding one form a bouquet on both sides, creating a niche arranged like an amphitheater in whose entry, a 7.5 m (25 ft) high figure resembling a bear on a pedestal is displayed.
- Fourth chamber, called "Carneiro" ("Lamb"), measures 18 m (59 ft) long, 20 m (66 ft) wide and 11 m (36 ft) high. It distinguishes itself from all the other chambers mostly by the gypsum powder covering the ground. Also noticeable in this room, besides the figure of a lamb, is an imposing figure resembling a gigantic mushroom.
- Fifth chamber, called "Salão das Piscinas" ("Hall of Pools"), measuring 23.5 m (77 ft) in length and width and 18 m (59 ft) in height, forms the deepest part of the cave. In the center of this cavern is a large basin about 1.5 m (4.9 ft) deep whose walls are covered with delicate crystals of fluorspar limestone. Large masses of stalagmites resembling ancient statues in a Roman bath adorn the opposite edges of the basin.
- Sixth chamber, called "Salão das Fadas" ("Hall of the Fairies"), is 13 m (43 ft) long and 15 m (49 ft) high. In this room bones of large animals, including the remains of a mammoth have been found. In the background of this chamber there is a passage to another room and a limpid cascade which has condensed itself into bright alabaster. The whole chamber and all the figures existing in it are decorated with a delicate crust of crystals of calcium carbonate, sometimes of the purest white, sometimes differently colored. The splendid reflections produced by the light illuminating the many facets of this crystal, dazzle the eye of those who gaze at this imagery and with it, see themselves transported to a fairy-like palace. Dr. Lund said: "My eyes have never seen anything more beautiful and magnificent in the domains of nature and art."
- Seventh chamber is divided into two parts. The first one is referred to as "Salão do Dr. Lund" ("Dr. Lund's Hall"), and is considered the most important of the chambers by the amount of bones that it contains. It is 42 meters long, 22 meters wide and 15 meters high. It leads downwards and forms many watersheds along the way. In the middle of the chamber there is a 60-centimeter-wide by 4.5-meter-deep coverage through which all excess of water is drained out of the cave. The second chamber is called "Salão do Cemitério" ("Cemetery Hall"), which is the largest of the chambers in the cave measuring 162.5 meters long by 56 meters wide. It is coated with a crumbly layer of plaster powder stalagmites which covers the ground, piling up to the ceiling.

=== Paleontology ===
Considered as the "cradle" of paleontology in the country, the grotto was discovered in 1825 by farmer Joaquim Maria Maquiné, then the landowner. It is widely known for its paleontological importance detected initially by Peter Clausen and the Danish naturalist Peter Wilhelm Lund who scientifically first explored it in 1834. Dr. Lund remained inside the cave nearly two years doing his research on the Brazilian paleontology, describing all the chambers, explaining the formation of stalagmites and stalactites and examining human remains and petrifaction of animals from the Quaternary period. Among others, he found fossilized skeletons of birds with an extraordinary curvature of up to three meters and the Nothrotherium maquinense, the smallest and most emblematic of the terrestrial sloths which he found in 1835 when he first explored the cave.

In 1868, after more than 30 years after the exploration of the cave, Lund wished to return to Cordisburgo and show the Duke of Saxe who visited the country, the natural beauty of this huge cave.

== See also ==
- List of caves in Brazil
