= Parque da Cascata =

The Parque da Cascata (meaning Waterfall Park in Portuguese) is the popular name of Parque Florestal Municipal de Sete Lagoas located at Serra Santa Helena, just 3 km (2 mi) from downtown Sete Lagoas, Minas Gerais, Brazil. It was created by decree on 27 September 1977.

== Caves and geology ==
The gorge of the waterfall in the Parque da Cascata is in fact the collapsed part of a karst cave. Although the Parque da Cascata is easy to reach by car, the actual gorge is hard to reach. The gorge starts with a waterfall and the best way to enter the gorge is following an erosion gully (because the vegetation is inhabited by dangerous snakes, spiders, scorpions etc.!).

Following the brook one sees a number of horizontal stalactites and stalagmites that clearly demonstrates that part of the cave has collapsed. Further down, the brook enters another system of caves with more stalactites and stalagmites. Unfortunately, vandalists have destroyed a number of them. The place where the brook wells out of the Serra Santa Helena is a place for practices of the Macumba religion.

The limestone area north of Belo Horizonte is called the Sete Lagoas Formation. It is in this limestone that the Lagoa Santa Karst was developed. The area around Sete Lagoas has many caves, of which the Gruta Rei do Mato is the most famous one.

== See also ==
- Caves
- List of caves
- List of waterfalls
