= Canápolis, Bahia =

Municipality of Bahia, Brazil

Coordinates: 13°04′12″S 44°12′07″W

Canápolis
- Municipality
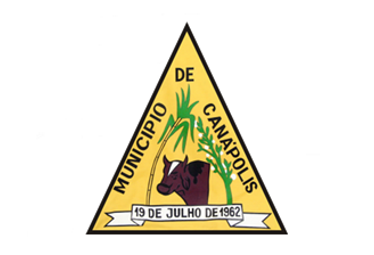
- Flag
- Interactive map of Canápolis
- Country: Brazil
- Region: Nordeste
- State: Bahia

Population (2020)
  - Total: 9,703
- Time zone: UTC−3 (BRT)

Canápolis is a municipality in the state of Bahia in the North-East region of Brazil.

== See also ==
- List of municipalities in Bahia
