= Itaetê =

Municipality of Bahia, Brazil

Coordinates: 12°59′S 40°58′W

- Municipality
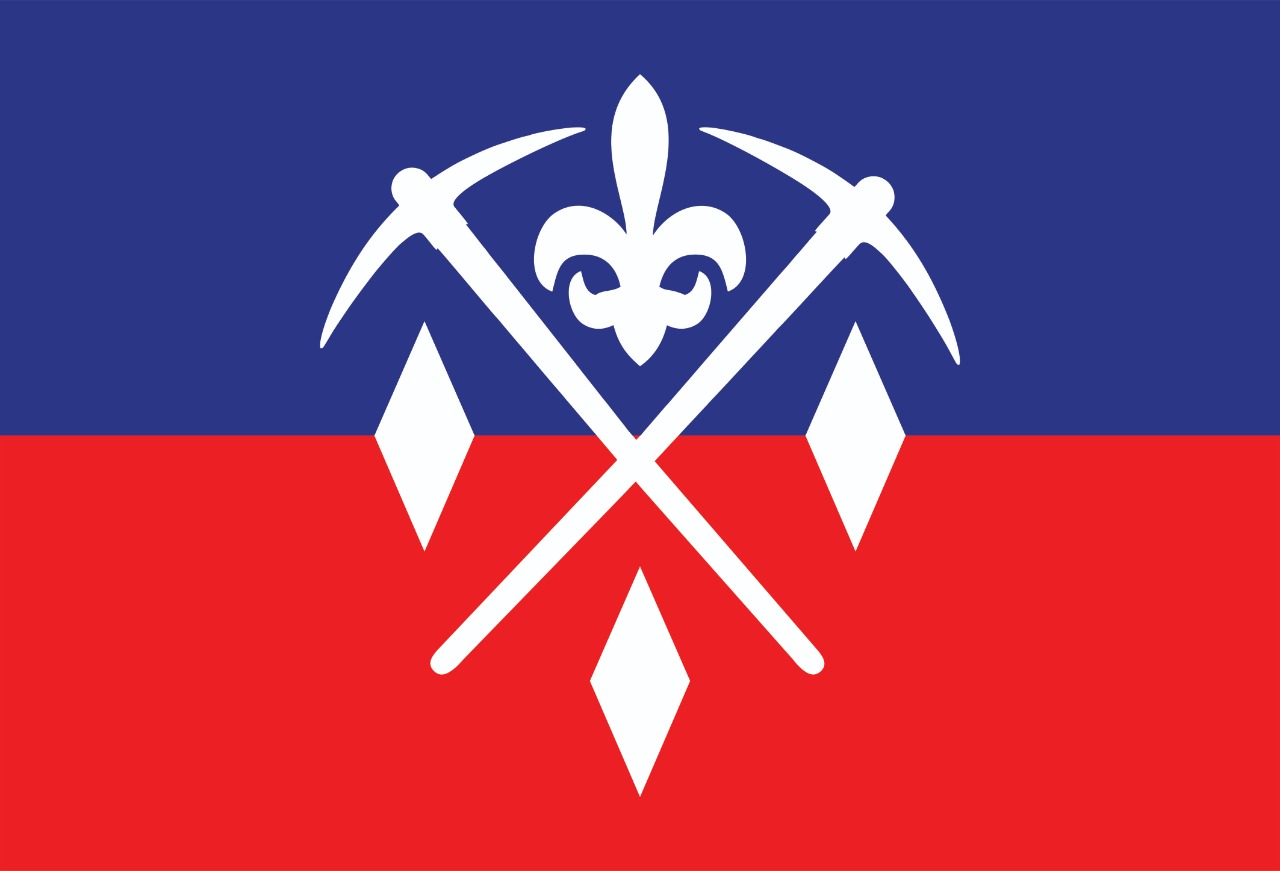
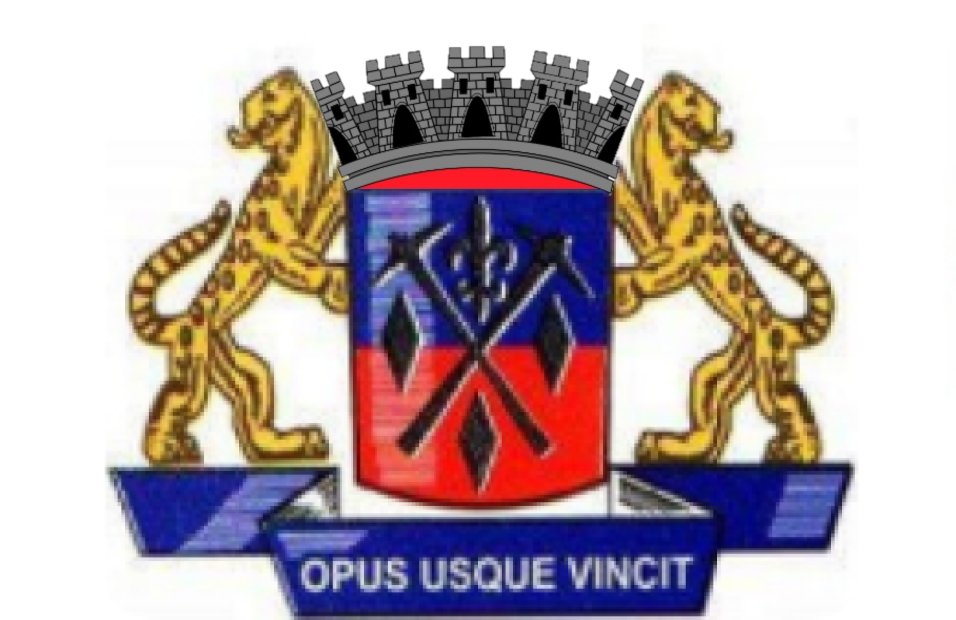
- Flag Coat of arms
- Interactive map of Itaetê
- Country: Brazil
- Region: Nordeste
- State: Bahia

Population (2020)
  - Total: 16,110
- Time zone: UTC−3 (BRT)

Itaetê is a municipality in the state of Bahia in the North-East region of Brazil.

As of 2020, the population is estimated at 16,110 inhabitants.

== See also ==
- List of municipalities in Bahia
