= Caverna da Tapagem =

Cave in São Paulo, Brazil

Coordinates: 24°37′33″S 48°24′17″W

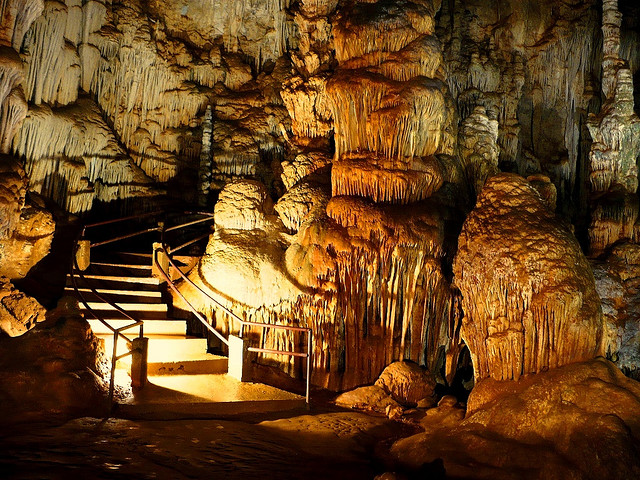
- Partial view of one of the stairways inside the Devil's Cave
- Interactive map of Caverna da Tapagem
- Location: São Paulo, Brazil
- Depth: 175 meters (574 ft)
- Length: 6,237 meters (20,463 ft)
- Discovery: 1891
- Geology: Limestone
- Access: SP 193
- Cave survey: 3,200 meters (10,500 ft) surveyed
- Website: Portal Caverna do Diabo

Caverna da Tapagem (English: Hurdle's Cave) (SP-002), also Caverna do Diabo (English: Devil's Cave), is a cave located within the Caverna do Diabo State Park next to the Alto Ribeira Tourist State Park, in the municipality of Eldorado, Iporanga, 280 km from São Paulo, Brazil. It is the second longest cave in the state of São Paulo and also the highlight of what the local guides call "Circuit Disneyland," which is a series of family attractions that people of all ages can enjoy.

== Description ==
The beginning of the formation of the cave is pointed out by researchers as occurred about 600 million years ago, during the Precambrian era. Today almost 10 km of galleries and halls have already been mapped, all rich in speleothems. Of the 6.237 meters of the cave whose entrance measures approximately 40 meters high, 3.200 meters have already been surveyed, of which only 700 meters are free for tourists. It measures 152 deep from one side of the cave to the other. All this area has a sound system and lighting, walkways, stairs and handrails for safety measures.

The cave contains numerous stone curtains, columns, towers, travertine, stalactites, stalagmites and calcite cascades which intrigue specialists and tourists who try to unravel the mysteries of the place. At times, to overcome obstacles, it is necessary to use ropes to be sure of standing on safe ground. Inside the cave, the silence is broken only by the waters that glide over the rocks. The most interesting formations can be seen in the hall known as "The Cathedral". Some of these forms were immortalized with names somewhat strange like the Guardian, Snow White, Cemetery, Three Kings, Temple of Doom, Devil's Cauldron and Tower of Pisa. Each group of tourists is formed of 12 visitors, at intervals of 20 minutes between them, and each one is allowed to stay no longer than 60 minutes inside the cave.

== Legends ==
Discovered in 1886 by the explorer Sigismund Ernst Richard Krone, the cave was then named Caverna da Tapagem, meaning "mysterious place". Some legends were responsible for the appearance of the most popular pseudonym Devil's Cave around 1964, for the Indians who inhabited the vicinity of the cave believed that if they were hit by drops of water from the ceiling, they would be then transformed into stone. To them, the strange geological formations which called their attention were in fact people and other animals that had been petrified by the constant dripping in the cave. Those who later inhabited the site, also believed that the noises heard at the entrance of the cave were groans of lost souls who had been punished by the devil.

== Gallery ==
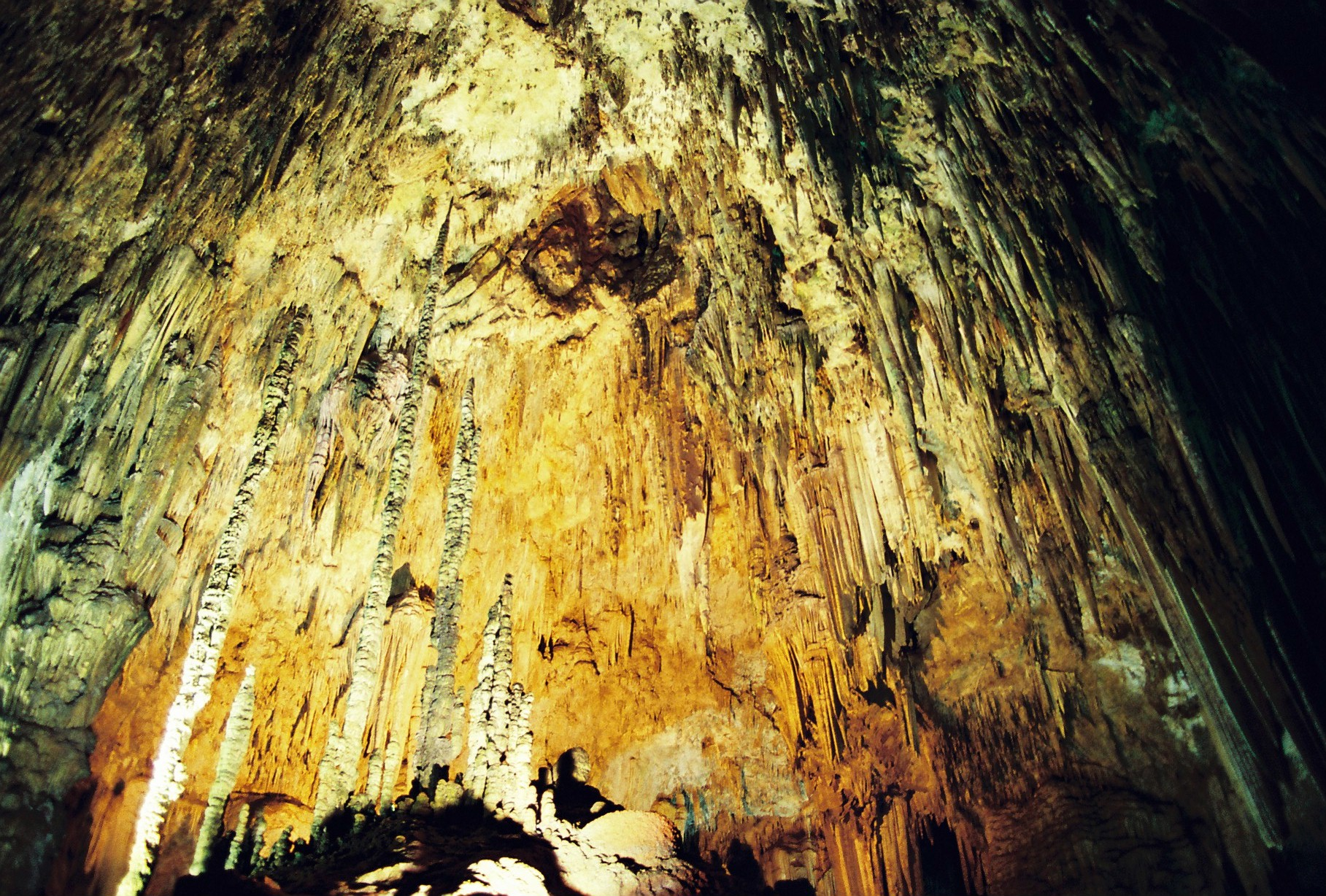
Inside the Devil's Cave

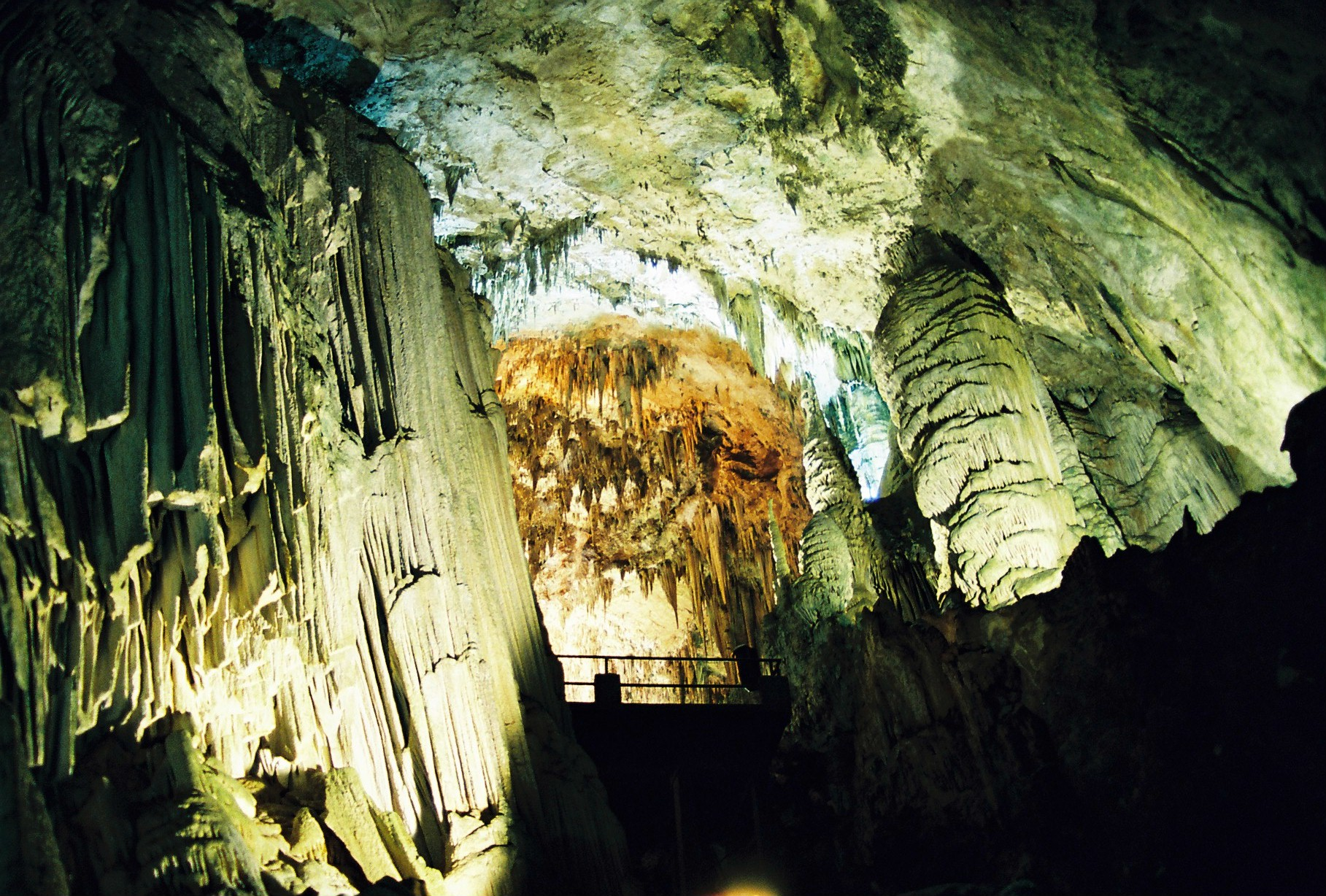
Another view of the cave

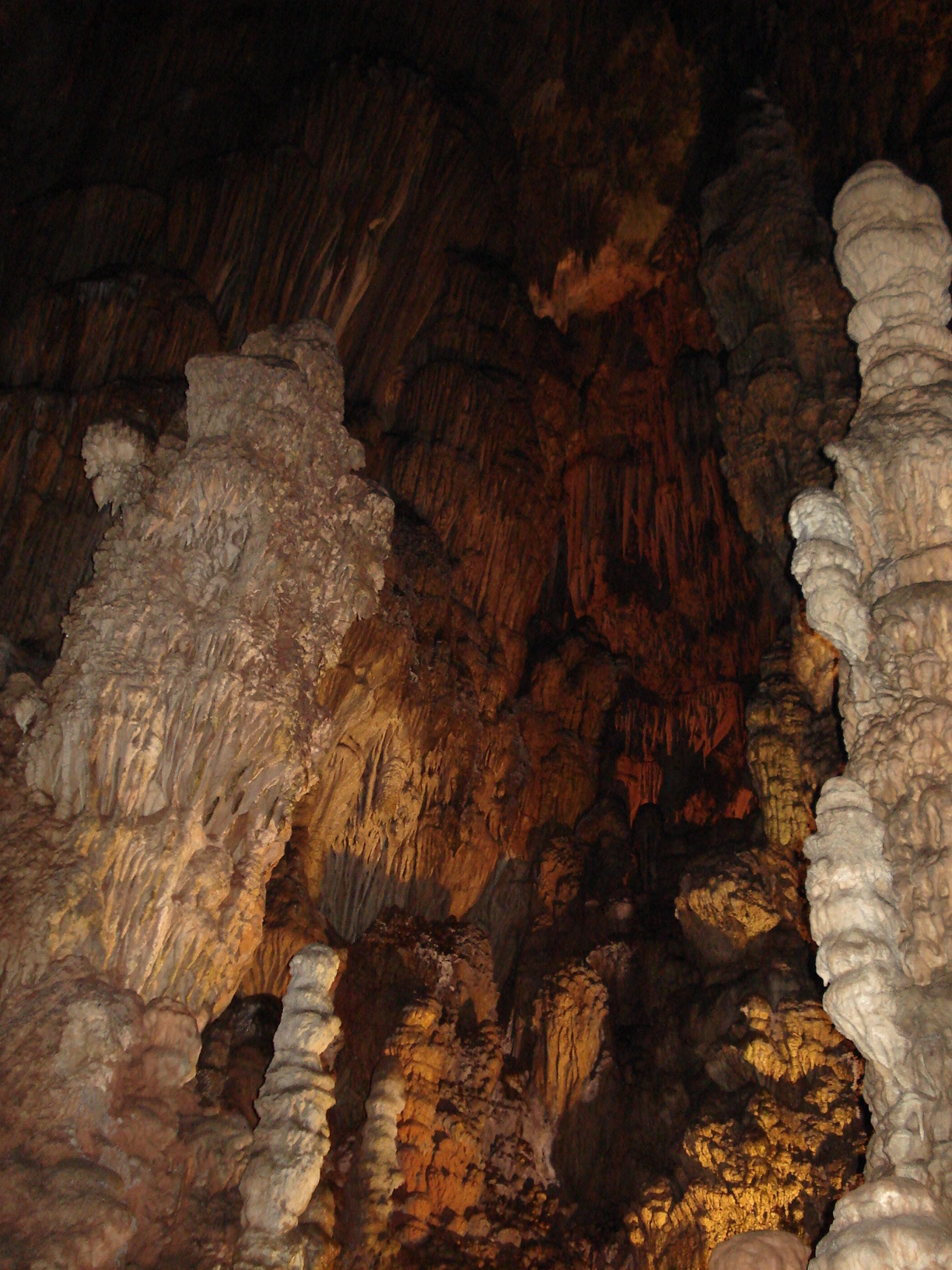
Partial view of the Tower of Pisa

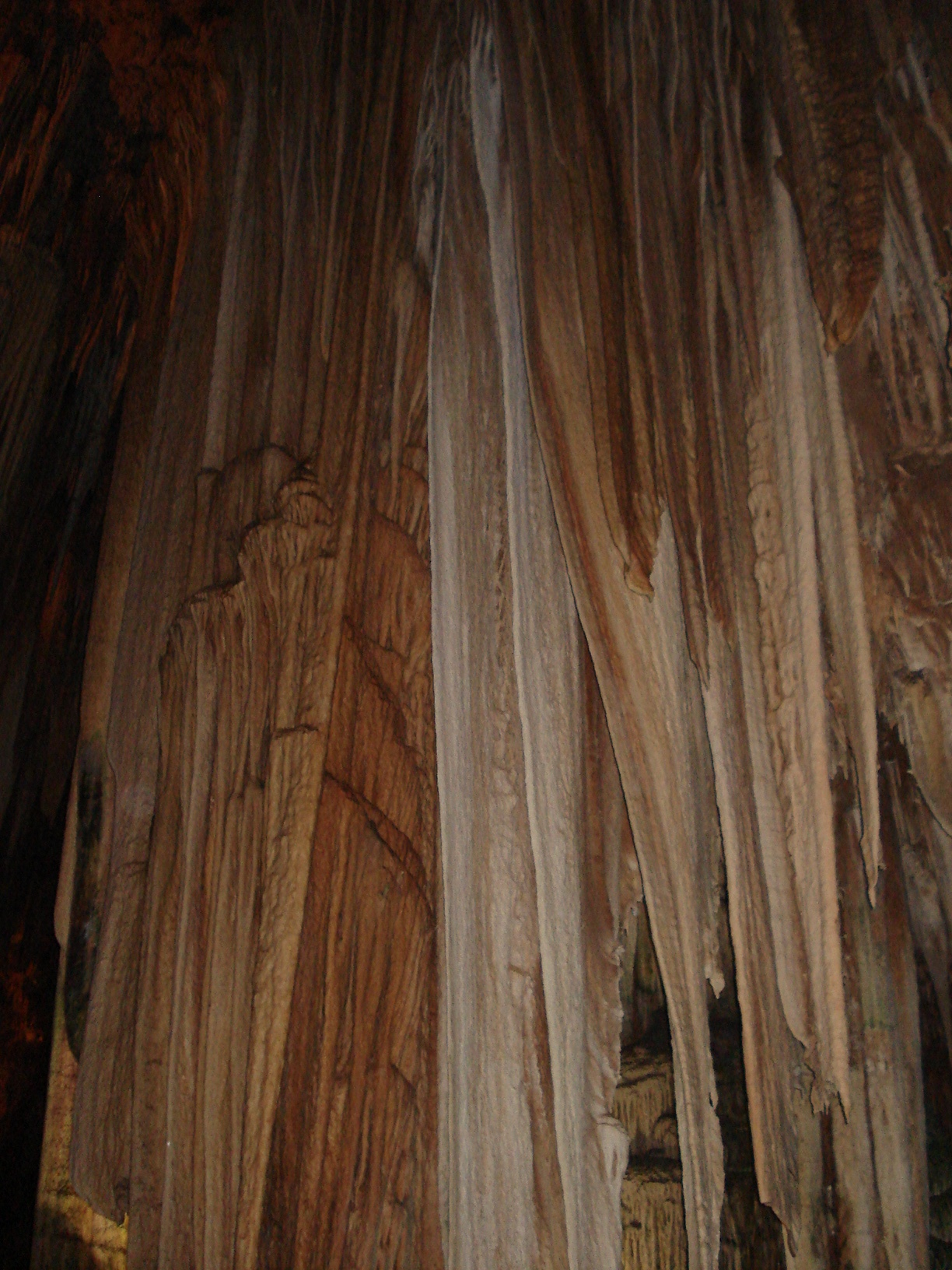
Stalactites formed inside the cave

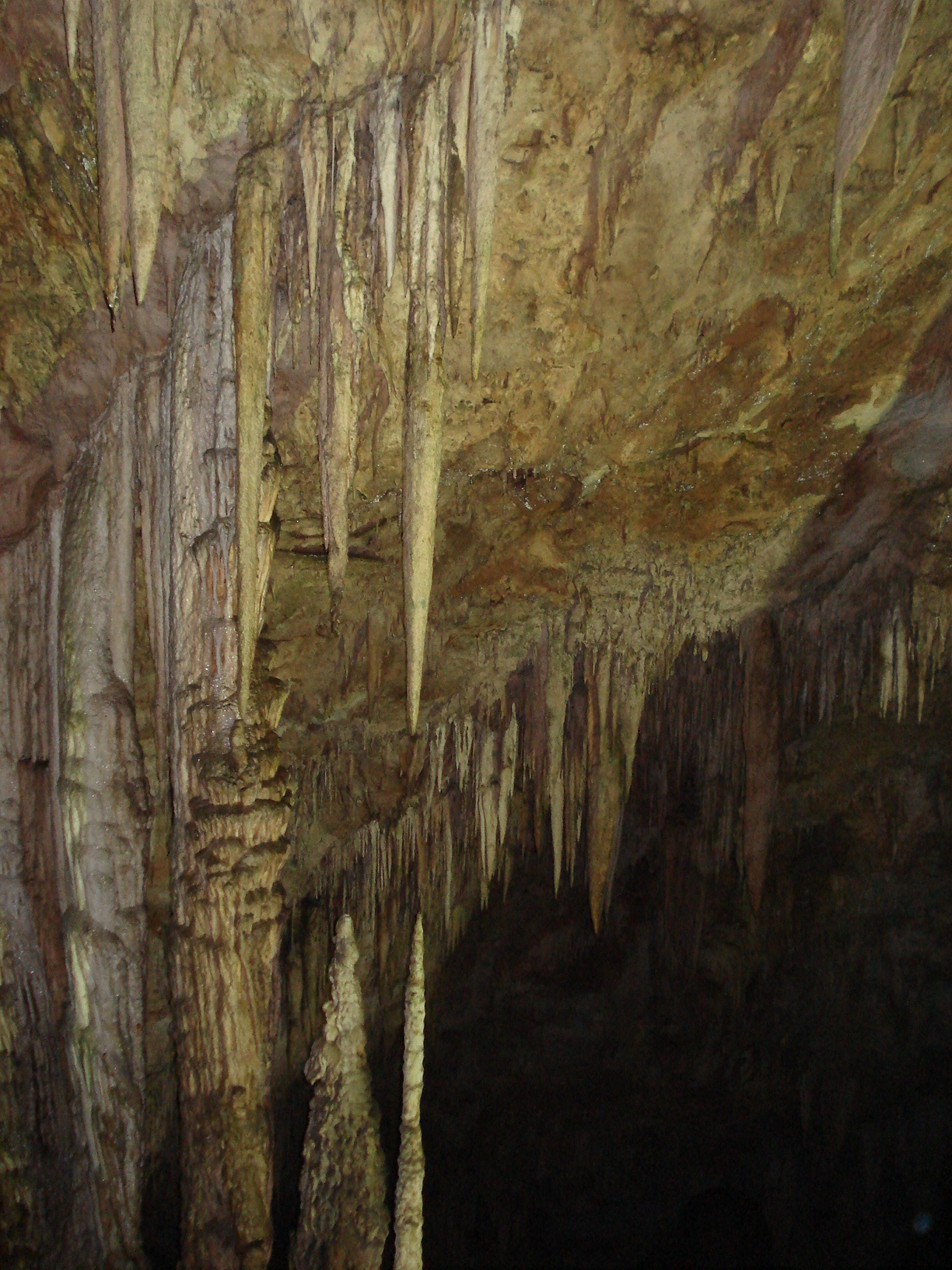
Another view of the cave

== See also ==
- List of caves in Brazil
