= Toca da Boa Vista =

- Location within Brazil
- Location: Campo Formoso
- Coordinates: 10.162500°S 40.859722°W
- Depth: 50 m (160 ft)
- Length: 114 km (71 mi)
- Discovery: 1987
- Geology: Limestone
- Entrances: 1

Toca da Boa Vista (BA-082) is located within the municipality of Campo Formoso, 11 km east of the town of Lage dos Negros, in the State of Bahia, Brazil. It is part of the Chapada Diamantina mountain range. The area is karstified Salitre formation dolomite bedrock of the Una Group, the brazilian name of the Ediacaran, which is of Precambrian age, about 600 Ma old. This time at the end of the Precambrian was characterized by the beginning of multicellular life, and actually, the sedimentation of limestone was much different from the Mesozoic era. The microorganisms, which later reduced the amount of phosphates and sulfur in the loose sediment on the seabed before diagenesis started, did not yet exist. As a result, the chemistry of this dolomite is unique, and the high amount of phosphor and sulfur caused a unique process of cave formation. Groundwater set the sulfur free which was oxidized by microorganisms and created sulfuric acid, which again dissolved limestone. This process is called hypogene speleogenesis, where the acid which dissolves the limestone originates from the underground, the rock, instead of from the atmosphere.

The cave system is most famous for an enormous number of prehistoric bones, which were found in the cave. 20,000 years ago an enormous river transported dead animals into the cave, which formed massive deposits of bones. More than 50,000 bones have been excavated until now, among them the bones of huge mammals which are now extinct. An example is a 6 m long giant sloth, the newest discovery was a turkey vulture (Cathartes aura) in 2024.

As of 2024 this is the longest known cave of Brazil and it has 114 km of mapped passages. There are obstinate statements that it was the longest cave of the Southern Hemisphere, which are based on an article from 1999. At that time the statement was actually correct.

== See also ==
- List of caves in Brazil
- List of longest caves

== Sources ==
- Auler, A.S. & Smart, P.L. 1999. Toca da Boa Vista, Bahia state – the longest known cave in the Southern Hemisphere in: Schobbenhaus, C.; Campos, D.A.; Queiroz, E.T.; Winge, M.; Berbert-Born, M. (Edit.) Sítios Geológicos e Paleontológicos do Brasil. (Online)
