= Santana, Bahia =

Coordinates: 12.9828°S 44.0508°W

Santana
- Municipality
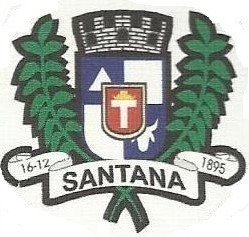
- Flag Coat of arms
- Interactive map of Santana
- Country: Brazil
- Region: Nordeste
- State: Bahia

Population (2020)
  - Total: 26,705
- Time zone: UTC−3 (BRT)

Santana is a municipality in the state of Bahia in the North-East region of Brazil.

== See also ==
- List of municipalities in Bahia
