= Campo Formoso =

Municipality of Bahia, Brazil

Campo Formoso Terra dos Minérios e Esmeraldas
- Municipality
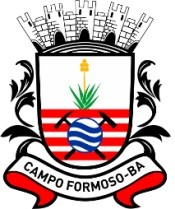
- Flag Coat of arms

- Location of Campo Formoso in Bahia

- Location of Campo Formoso in the Brazil
- Coordinates: 10°30′32.04″S 40°19′14.88″W
- Country: Brazil
- Region: Northeast
- State: Bahia
- Founded: July 28, 1880

Government
  - Mayor: Rosangela Maria Monteiro de Menezes (PSD)(2017 – 2020)

Area
  - Total: 7,258.68 km^{2} (2,802.59 sq mi)
- Elevation: 566 m (1,857 ft)

Population (2020)
  - Total: 71,487 hab. (BA: 28°)
  - Density: 9.8485/km^{2} (25.507/sq mi)
- Demonym: campo-formosense
- Time zone: UTC−3 (BRT)
- Postal code: 44790-000
- Website: campoformoso.ba.gov.br

Campo Formoso is a municipality in the state of Bahia in the North-East region of Brazil. Campo Formoso covers 7,161.83 km^{2} (2,765.20 mi^{2}), and has a population of 71,487 with a population density of 9.2 inhabitants per square kilometer. It is about 248 miles from Bahia's capital Salvador. It is famous for the gems, rare stones and caves that are abundant in the area and it is the host of the cement factory, Cimpor. The city is surrounded by green mountains, and on the edge of one of them there are four transmission towers which allow the population to be connected to the Internet, TV, cable TV, wireless and phone. Campo Formoso has hot weather with temperatures of about 25 °C.

== See also ==
- List of municipalities in Bahia
