= Diocese of Araguaína =

Roman Catholic diocese in Brazil

Diocese of Araguaína Diocese de Araguaína

Location
- Country: Brazil
- Territory: Aragominas, Araguaína, Araguanã, Arapoema, Babaçulândia, Bandeirantes do Tocantins, Barra do Ouro, Campos Lindos, Carmolândia, Filadélfia, Goiatins, Muricilândia, Nova Olinda do Tocantins, Palmeirante, Pau d’Arco, Piraquê, Santa Fé do Araguaia, Xambioá, and Wanderlândia
- Ecclesiastical province: Province of Palmas
- Metropolitan: Pedro Brito Guimarães

Statistics
- Area: 35,826.93 km^{2} (13,832.86 sq mi)
- Population: Total; Catholics: 308,278; 215,794
- Parishes: 22

Information
- Denomination: Roman Catholic
- Rite: Roman Rite
- Established: January 31, 2023; 2 years ago
- Secular priests: 18

Current leadership
- Pope: Leo XIV
- Bishop-elect: Giovane Pereira de Melo

The Roman Catholic Diocese of Araguaína is a diocese of the Roman Catholic Church in Brazil. It is a suffragan diocese to the Archdiocese of Palmas, state of Tocantins.

== History ==
On 31 January 2023 the diocese was established from the diocesan territories of Tocantinópolis and Miracema do Tocantins.

== See also ==
- Roman Catholicism in Brazil
