= Bananal Island =

Island in Tocantins, Brazil

Bananal
Native name: Ilha do Bananal
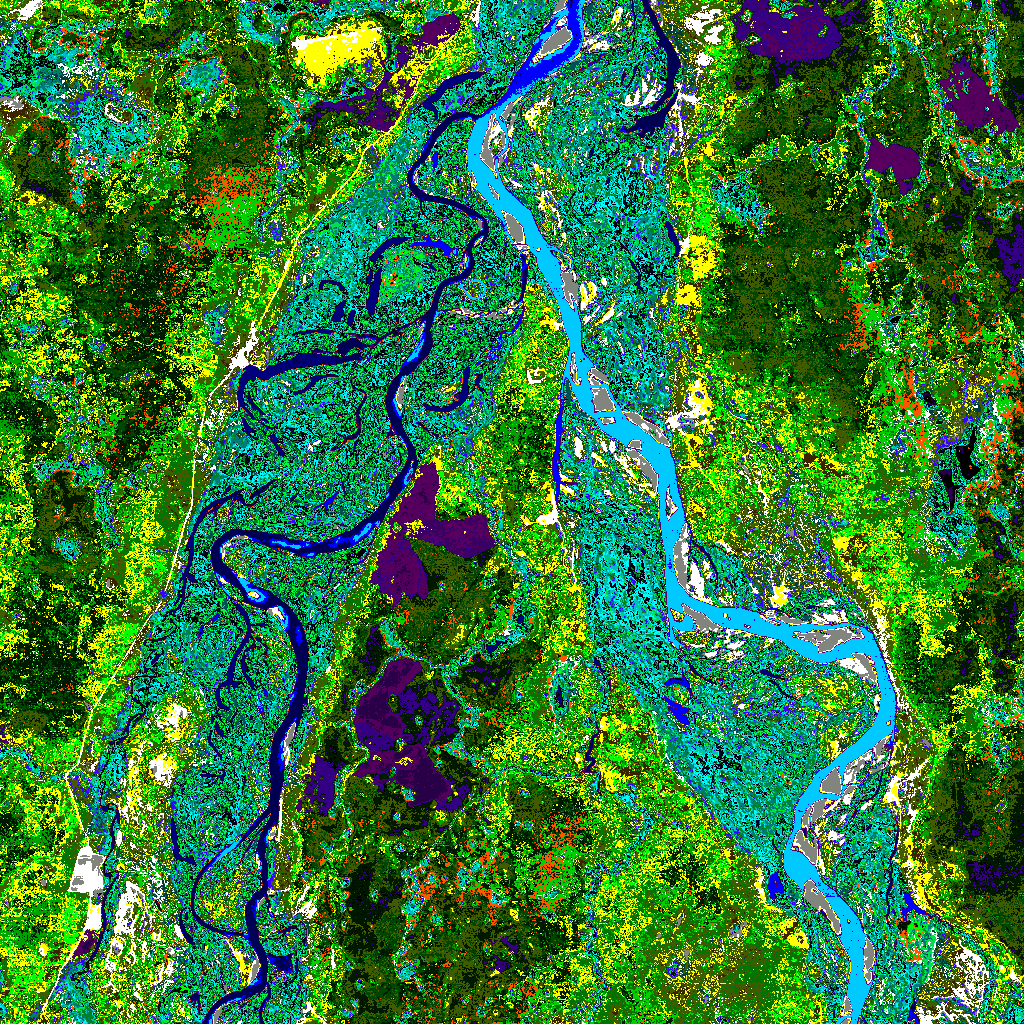
- Landsat image of the northern end of Bananal Island (the Rio das Mortes-Cristalino peninsula) on the Araguaia River

- Location within Brazil

Geography
- Location: Tocantins, Brazil
- Coordinates: 11°20′S 50°41′W
- Area: 19,162.25 km^{2} (7,398.59 sq mi)
- Area rank: 49th

Administration
- Brazil
- State: Tocantins

Ramsar Wetland
- Official name: Ilha do Bananal
- Designated: 4 October 1993
- Reference no.: 624

Bananal Island (Portuguese: Ilha do Bananal, IPA: [banaˈnaw]) is a large river island formed from the bisection of the Araguaia River, in southwestern Tocantins, Brazil. The island is formed by a fork in a very flat section of the Araguaia; the western stream of the fork retains the name Araguaia and the eastern one is called the Javaés River. By reuniting later, both streams form Bananal Island, which is the second largest river island in the world and the largest without an ocean coastline, at 320 kilometres (200 mi) long and 55 kilometres (34 mi) wide. Its total area is 19,162.25 square kilometres (7,398.59 mi^{2}). The Jaburu do Bananal is the largest of several rivers flowing within the island, parallel to the Araguaia.

== Environmental and cultural protection ==
Bananal Island is a nature and culture preserve. In accordance with Article 28 of the Statute of Indian Law (Artigo 28 do Estatuto do Indío-lei) No. 6001 laid out on 19 December 1973, an area of 5,577.26 square kilometres (2,153.39 mi^{2}) is preserved as Araguaia National Park and further 13,584.99 square kilometres (5,245.19 mi^{2}) as cultural preserve for Brazilian Indigenous. The northern third of the island, which is designated as a national park, is a popular destination for ecotourism. The southern two-thirds are indigenous territories.

== Inhabitants ==
Although Brazilians of non-native descent lived on the island in the past, today the entire population is indigenous.

At least four tribes live on Bananal Island: the Javaés, Karajá, Ava-Canoeiro, and Tapirapé. There are sixteen aldeias or villages on the island: Barra do Rio, Barreira Branca, Boa Esperança, Boto Velho, Cachoeirinha, Fontoura, JK, Kanoanã, Kaxiwe, Macaúba, Santa Isabel, São João, Txoude, Txuiri, Wari-Wari, Watau.

There are no bridges to the island from the states of Tocantins to the east nor from Mato Grosso to the west. For the greater majority of the year, the only transport to the island is by boat. However, for a few weeks during the dry season (June – August) the river is low enough that it can be forded and the island can be reached by car. The villages have roads wide enough for cars and tractors, but most travellers walk or ride horses or bicycles.

=== Image gallery ===
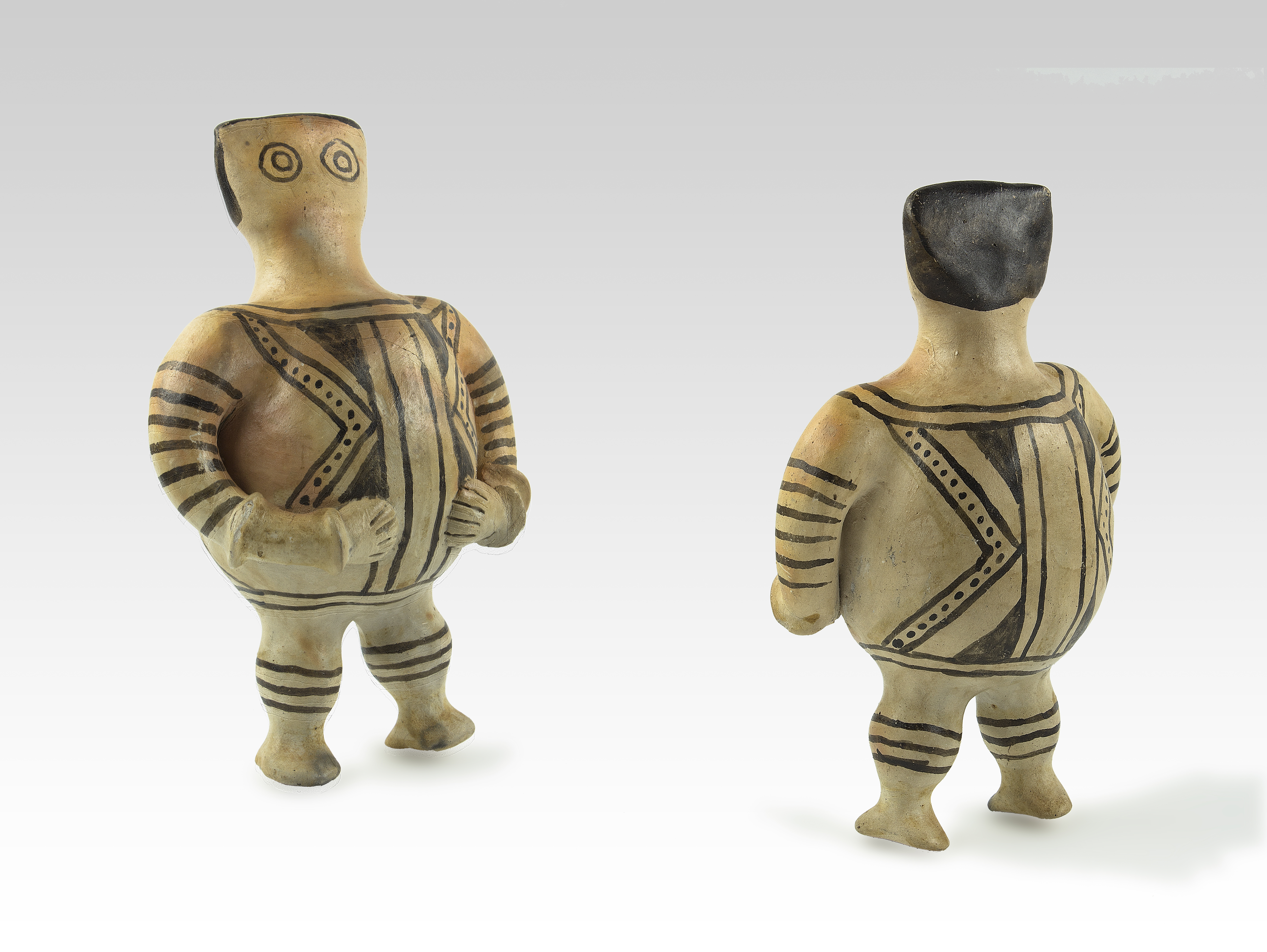
Ceramic statuette – MHNT

Karajá statuette

== Municipalities ==
From north to south, the island forms the western portions of the municipalities of Pium, Lagoa da Confusão, and Formoso do Araguaia, in southwestern Tocantins.
