= Jardim =

Jardim (Portuguese for "garden") may refer to:

== People ==
- Alberto João Jardim, Portuguese politician
- José Jardim (born 1973), Curaçaoan politician
- Leonardo Jardim (1974), Portuguese football coach
- Luís Jardim (1950–2025), Portuguese percussionist
- Simone Jardim (born 1979), Brazilian-American pickleball player
- Vicky Jardim, Australian television reporter

== Places ==
=== Brazil ===
- Belo Jardim, a municipality in the State of Pernambuco
- Bom Jardim, Maranhão, a municipality in the State of Maranhão
- Bom Jardim, Pernambuco, a municipality in the State of Pernambuco
- Bom Jardim, Rio de Janeiro, a municipality in the State of Rio de Janeiro
- Bom Jardim de Goiás, a municipality in the State of Goiás
- Bom Jardim de Minas, a municipality in the State of Minas Gerais
- Bom Jardim da Serra, a municipality in the State of Santa Catarina
- Jardim, Ceará, a municipality in the State of Ceará
- Jardim, Mato Grosso do Sul, a municipality in the State of Mato Grosso do Sul
- Jardim, São Paulo, São Paulo, a bairro in the State of São Paulo (state)
- Jardim Alegre, a municipality in the State of Paraná
- Jardim de Angicos, a municipality in the State of Rio Grande do Norte
- Jardim do Mulato, a municipality in the State of Piauí
- Jardim Olinda, a municipality in the State of Paraná
- Jardim de Piranhas, a municipality in the State of Rio Grande do Norte
- Jardim do Seridó, a municipality in the State of Rio Grande do Norte
- Novo Jardim, a municipality in the State of Tocantins
- Santo Antônio do Jardim, a municipality in the State of São Paulo
- Silva Jardim, a municipality in the State of Rio de Janeiro

=== Portugal ===
- Jardim do Mar, a civil parish in the municipality of Calheta, Madeira
- Jardim da Serra, a civil parish in the municipality of Câmara de Lobos, Madeira
