= Taguatinga =

Taguatinga may refer to:

- Taguatinga, Federal District, administrative region in the Federal District, Brazil
- Taguatinga, Tocantins, municipality in the state of Tocantins, Brazil
- Taguatinga Esporte Clube, football club of the Federal District, Brazil
