= Fortaleza (disambiguation) =

Fortaleza is a city in Brazil.

Fortaleza or variations such as La Fortaleza may also refer to:

== Albums ==
- La Fortaleza, a 2020 studio album by Chilean-American singer-songwriter Francisca Valenzuela

== Films ==
- La Fortaleza, a 2020 drama film directed by Venezuelan Jorge Thielen Armand

== Fortresses ==
- Fortaleza del Cerro, a fortress in Montevideo, Uruguay.
- Fortaleza Ozama, a sixteenth-century fortress in Santo Domingo, Dominican Republic.
- Fortaleza Ruin (Gila Bend, Arizona), listed on the NRHP in Maricopa County, Arizona
- La Fortaleza, the sixteenth-century executive mansion of the governor of Puerto Rico in Old San Juan, San Juan.
- Guia Fortress, in Macao, China, also known as Fortaleza de Guia
- Fortaleza de Jagua, a fortress south of Cienfuegos in Cuba
- Fortaleza de San Carlos de La Cabaña, in Havana, Cuba
- Fortaleza da São Tomé, in Kottappuram, Kodungallur, Kerala, India

== Municipalities ==
- Fortaleza de Minas, a Brazilian municipality located in the southwest of the state of Minas Gerais.
- Fortaleza dos Nogueiras, a municipality in the state of Maranhão in the Northeast region of Brazil.
- Fortaleza do Tabocão, a municipality in the state of Tocantins in the Northern region of Brazil.
- Fortaleza dos Valos, a municipality in the state Rio Grande do Sul, Brazil.

== Rivers ==
- Fortaleza River, a river in southern Brazil.
- Fortaleza River (Peru), a river in northern Peru

== Sport ==
- Fortaleza Esporte Clube, Brazilian football club
- Fortaleza F.C., Colombian football club
