= Lavandeira =

Lavandeira may refer to:

- Lavandeira, Tocantins, a municipality in the State of Tocantins
- Lavandeira (Carrazeda de Ansiães), a civil parish in the municipality of Carrazeda de Ansiães
- Mario Lavandeira (born 1978), known professionally as Perez Hilton, American blogger, columnist, and media personality
