= Aparecida (disambiguation) =

Aparecida may refer to:

- Our Lady of Aparecida, the patron saint of Brazil
- Places:
  - Aparecida, a municipality in São Paulo, Brazil
  - Aparecida, Paraíba, a municipality in Paraíba, Brazil
  - Aparecida do Taboado, a municipality in Mato Grosso do Sul, Brazil
  - Conceição da Aparecida, a municipality in Minas Gerais, Brazil
  - Aparecida do Rio Negro, a municipality in Tocantins, Brazil
  - Nossa Senhora Aparecida, a municipality in Sergipe, Brazil
  - Aparecida de Goiânia, a municipality in Goiás, Brazil
  - Aparecida do Rio Doce, a municipality in Goiás, Brazil
  - a common name for the parish Torno, Portugal
