= Ipueiras =

Ipueiras may refer to the following places in Brazil:

- Ipueiras, Ceará
- Ipueiras, Tocantins
