= Sucupira =

Sucupira may refer to:

- Sucupira, Tocantins, a municipality in the state of Tocantins, Brazil
- Sucupira (TV series), a Chilean telenovela
- Sucupira River, a river in the state of Pará, Brazil
- sucupira-branca is a Brazilian legume of the Cerrado.
