= Delino Marçal =

- Birth name: Valdelino Marçal da Costa
- Also known as: Delino
- Born: January 18, 1986 (age 39), Arapoema, Tocantins, Brazil
- Genres: contemporary Christian music
- Occupation(s): singer and songwriter
- Years active: 2011 – currently
- Labels: MK Music (2015 – currently)
- Website: Singer profile at MK Music

Valdelino Marçal da Costa, better known as Delino Marçal (born January 18, 1986, Arapoema) is a gospel singer and songwriter.

== Biography ==
Delino was born in Arapoema, Tocantins, on January 18, 1986. He is a singer and composer of gospel music, a priest, a member of the Headquarters Church of the Campo Campinas Assembly of God, in Goiânia, presided over by Pastor Oídes José do Carmo.

Born and raised in a Christian home, the youngest of 9 children, he went to Goiânia with his family when he was 6 months old. He started his ministry helping in the church that his mother pastored, leading and playing in the praise group.

With his style and with the motivation to take the word of God through simple but striking songs, he set out for his solo career, having his first independent CD, entitled "Que Amor é Esse?", released in 2013.

On October 30, 2015, he signed a contract with the label MK Music and in December, he released the album Nada Além da Graça, with the work song "Deus é Deus", which debuted impressively, among the most requested on the carioca Radio 93 FM.

In July 2018, the singer released his second album through MK Music, Guarda Meu Coração. The record won the Latin Grammy in 2019.

On January 14, 2022, his mother, Pastor Odete, was attacked on the morning of the same day, while praying in church. An unidentified naked man, entered the church carrying an iron bar where he struck blows leading to the church pastor's death.

== Discography ==
- 2013: What Love Is This?
- 2015: Nothing But Grace
- 2017: Live Session
- 2018: Guard My Heart
