= Presidente Kennedy =

Presidente Kennedy (lit. President Kennedy) may refer to two Brazilian cities named after deceased United States president John F. Kennedy:

- Presidente Kennedy, Espírito Santo, in the state of Espírito Santo
- Presidente Kennedy, Tocantins, in the state Tocantins
