= Esperantina =

Esperantina may refer to:

- Esperantina, Piauí, a city in the Northeast Region of Brazil
- Esperantina, Tocantins, a city in the North Region of Brazil
