= São Valério =

Municipality in Tocantins, Brazil

Coordinates: 11°59′S 48°10′W

São Valério da Natividade
- Municipality
- Interactive map of São Valério da Natividade
- Country: Brazil
- Region: Northern
- State: Tocantins
- Mesoregion: Oriental do Tocantins

Population (2020)
  - Total: 3,904
- Time zone: UTC−3 (BRT)

São Valério da Natividade is a municipality in the state of Tocantins in the Northern region of Brazil.

== See also ==
- List of municipalities in Tocantins
