= Novo Alegre =

Municipality in Tocantins, Brazil

Coordinates: 12.9308°S 46.5739°W

- Municipality
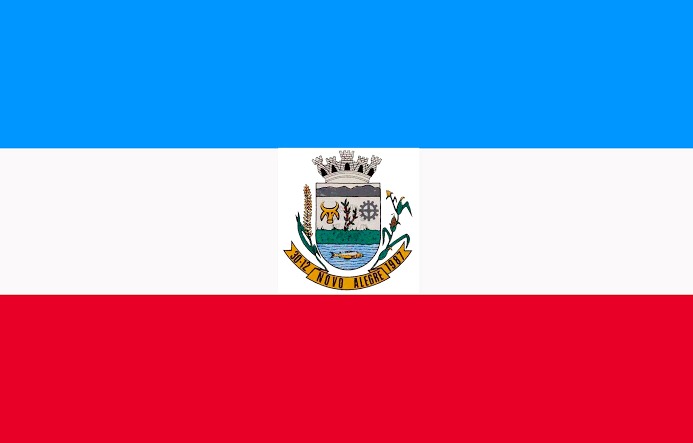
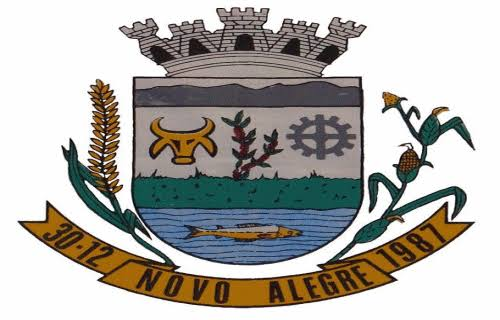
- Flag Coat of arms
- Interactive map of Novo Alegre
- Country: Brazil
- Region: Northern
- State: Tocantins
- Mesoregion: Oriental do Tocantins

Population (2020)
  - Total: 2,332
- Time zone: UTC−3 (BRT)

Novo Alegre is a municipality in the state of Tocantins in the Northern region of Brazil.

== See also ==
- List of municipalities in Tocantins
