= Tupirama =

Municipality in Tocantins, Brazil

Coordinates: 8°55′S 48°06′W

- Municipality
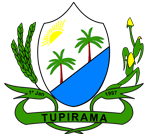
- Flag Coat of arms
- Interactive map of Tupirama
- Country: Brazil
- Region: Northern
- State: Tocantins
- Mesoregion: Ocidental do Tocantins

Population (2020)
  - Total: 1,922
- Time zone: UTC−3 (BRT)

Tupirama is a municipality in the state of Tocantins in the Northern region of Brazil.

== See also ==
- List of municipalities in Tocantins
