= Nazaré, Tocantins =

Municipality in Tocantins, Brazil

Coordinates: 6°22′19″S 47°39′50″W

- Municipality
- Interactive map of Nazaré, Tocantins
- Country: Brazil
- Region: Northern
- State: Tocantins
- Mesoregion: Ocidental do Tocantins

Population (2020)
  - Total: 3,834
- Time zone: UTC−3 (BRT)

Nazaré, Tocantins is a municipality in the state of Tocantins in the Northern region of Brazil.

== See also ==
- List of municipalities in Tocantins
