= Peixe =

Municipality in Tocantins, Brazil

Coordinates: 12°01′30″S 48°32′20″W

- Municipality
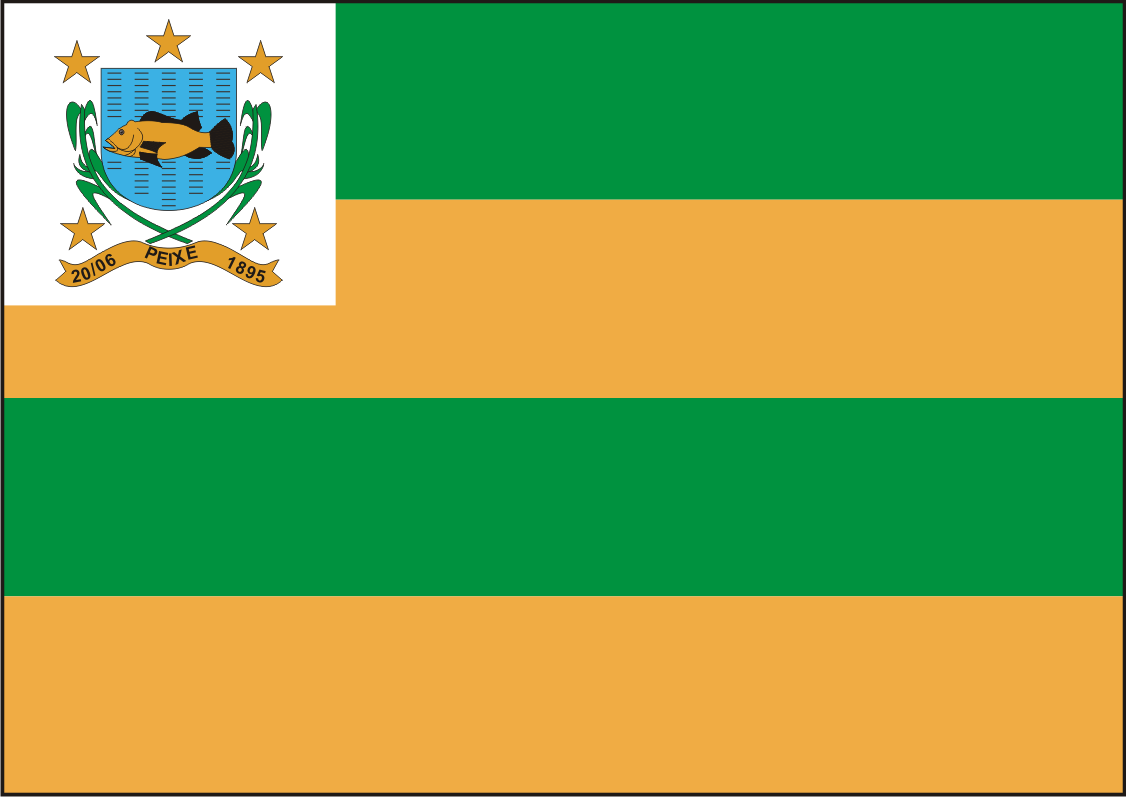
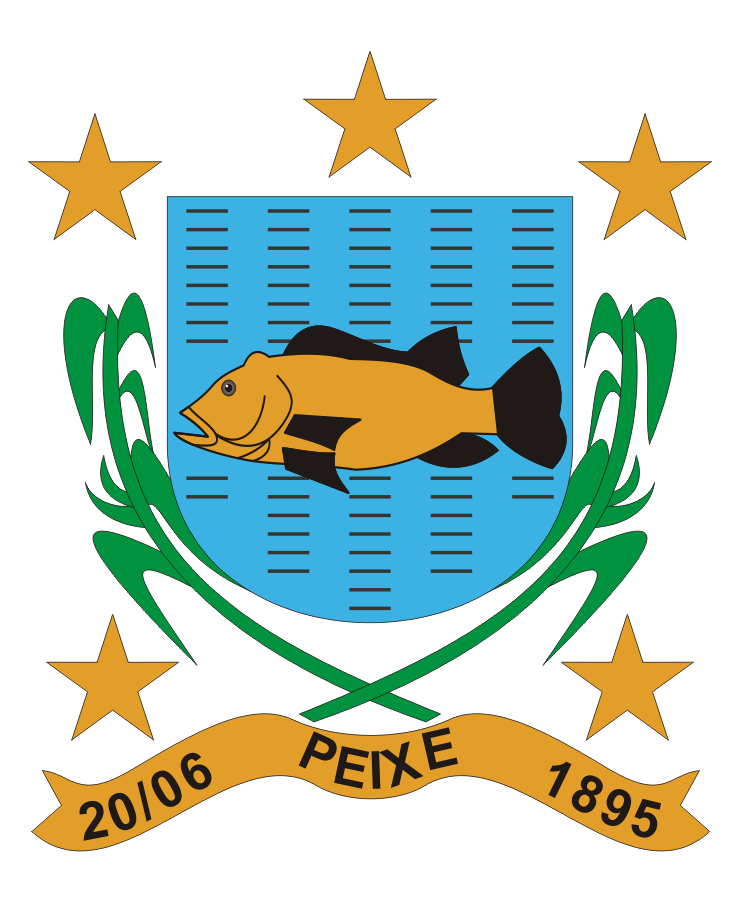
- Flag Coat of arms
- Interactive map of Peixe
- Country: Brazil
- Region: Northern
- State: Tocantins
- Mesoregion: Ocidental do Tocantins

Population (2020)
  - Total: 11,873
- Time zone: UTC−3 (BRT)

Peixe (Portuguese for "fish") is a municipality in the state of Tocantins in the Northern region of Brazil.

== Geography ==
=== Climate ===
Climate data for Peixe (1991–2020)
Month	Jan	Feb	Mar	Apr	May	Jun	Jul	Aug	Sep	Oct	Nov	Dec	Year
Mean daily maximum °C (°F)	32.1 (89.8)	32.2 (90.0)	32.2 (90.0)	32.9 (91.2)	33.4 (92.1)	33.3 (91.9)	33.9 (93.0)	35.8 (96.4)	36.9 (98.4)	35.6 (96.1)	33.1 (91.6)	32.3 (90.1)	33.6 (92.5)
Daily mean °C (°F)	26.1 (79.0)	26.0 (78.8)	26.2 (79.2)	26.5 (79.7)	26.1 (79.0)	24.8 (76.6)	24.5 (76.1)	26.2 (79.2)	28.2 (82.8)	28.1 (82.6)	26.8 (80.2)	26.3 (79.3)	26.3 (79.3)
Mean daily minimum °C (°F)	22.4 (72.3)	22.4 (72.3)	22.5 (72.5)	22.5 (72.5)	21.2 (70.2)	18.9 (66.0)	17.7 (63.9)	18.8 (65.8)	21.3 (70.3)	22.7 (72.9)	22.7 (72.9)	22.5 (72.5)	21.3 (70.3)
Average precipitation mm (inches)	270.2 (10.64)	211.0 (8.31)	215.8 (8.50)	125.2 (4.93)	22.9 (0.90)	4.7 (0.19)	0.0 (0.0)	0.1 (0.00)	32.3 (1.27)	92.9 (3.66)	190.1 (7.48)	252.3 (9.93)	1,417.5 (55.81)
Average precipitation days (≥ 1.0 mm)	15.8	14.1	14.8	8.7	2.0	0.2	0.0	0.1	2.5	7.4	11.9	15.4	92.9
Average relative humidity (%)	81.0	81.7	81.8	78.6	71.0	63.5	56.3	47.7	49.1	62.7	75.4	79.4	69.0
Average dew point °C (°F)	22.8 (73.0)	22.9 (73.2)	23.1 (73.6)	22.9 (73.2)	21.1 (70.0)	18.3 (64.9)	16.3 (61.3)	15.3 (59.5)	17.0 (62.6)	20.6 (69.1)	22.4 (72.3)	22.7 (72.9)	20.5 (68.9)
Mean monthly sunshine hours	172.5	154.8	171.7	210.2	261.6	285.6	307.1	301.9	238.6	211.8	163.6	163.5	2,642.9
Source: NOAA

== See also ==
- List of municipalities in Tocantins
