= Fátima, Tocantins =

Municipality in Tocantins, Brazil

Fátima
- Municipality
- Município de Fátima; Municipality of Fátima
- Location of Fátima in the state of Tocantins

- Location of Fátima in Brazil
- Coordinates: 10°45′39″S 48°54′25″W
- Country: Brazil
- Region: Northern
- State: Tocantins
- Mesoregion: Ocidental do Tocantins

Population (2020)
  - Total: 3,830
- Time zone: UTC−3 (BRT)

Fátima is a municipality in the state of Tocantins, in the Northern region of Brazil.

== See also ==
- List of municipalities in Tocantins
