= Itacajá =

Municipality in Tocantins, Brazil

Coordinates: 8°22′S 47°38′W

- Municipality
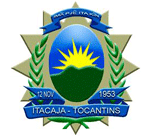
- Coat of arms
- Interactive map of Itacajá
- Country: Brazil
- Region: Northern
- State: Tocantins
- Mesoregion: Oriental do Tocantins

Population (2020)
  - Total: 7,452
- Time zone: UTC−3 (BRT)

Itacajá is a municipality in the state of Tocantins in the Northern region of Brazil.

== See also ==
- List of municipalities in Tocantins
