= São Sebastião do Tocantins =

Municipality in Tocantins, Brazil

- Municipality
- The Municipality of São Sebastião do Tocantins
- Location of São Sebastião do Tocantins in the State of Tocantins
- Coordinates: 05°15′25″S 48°12′00″W
- Country: Brazil
- Region: North
- State: Tocantins

Government
  - Mayor: Vilmede Alves de Sousa (PPS)

Area
  - Total: 287.271 km^{2} (110.916 sq mi)
- Elevation: 105 m (344 ft)

Population (2020)
  - Total: 4,852
  - Density: 15.8/km^{2} (41/sq mi)
- Time zone: UTC−3 (BRT)
- HDI (2000): 0.610 – medium

São Sebastião do Tocantins is the northernmost city in the state of Tocantins.

== See also ==
- List of municipalities in Tocantins
