= Couto de Magalhães =

Municipality in Tocantins, Brazil

Coordinates: 08°17′02″S 49°14′49″W

Couto Magalhães
- Municipality
- The Municipality of Couto Magalhães
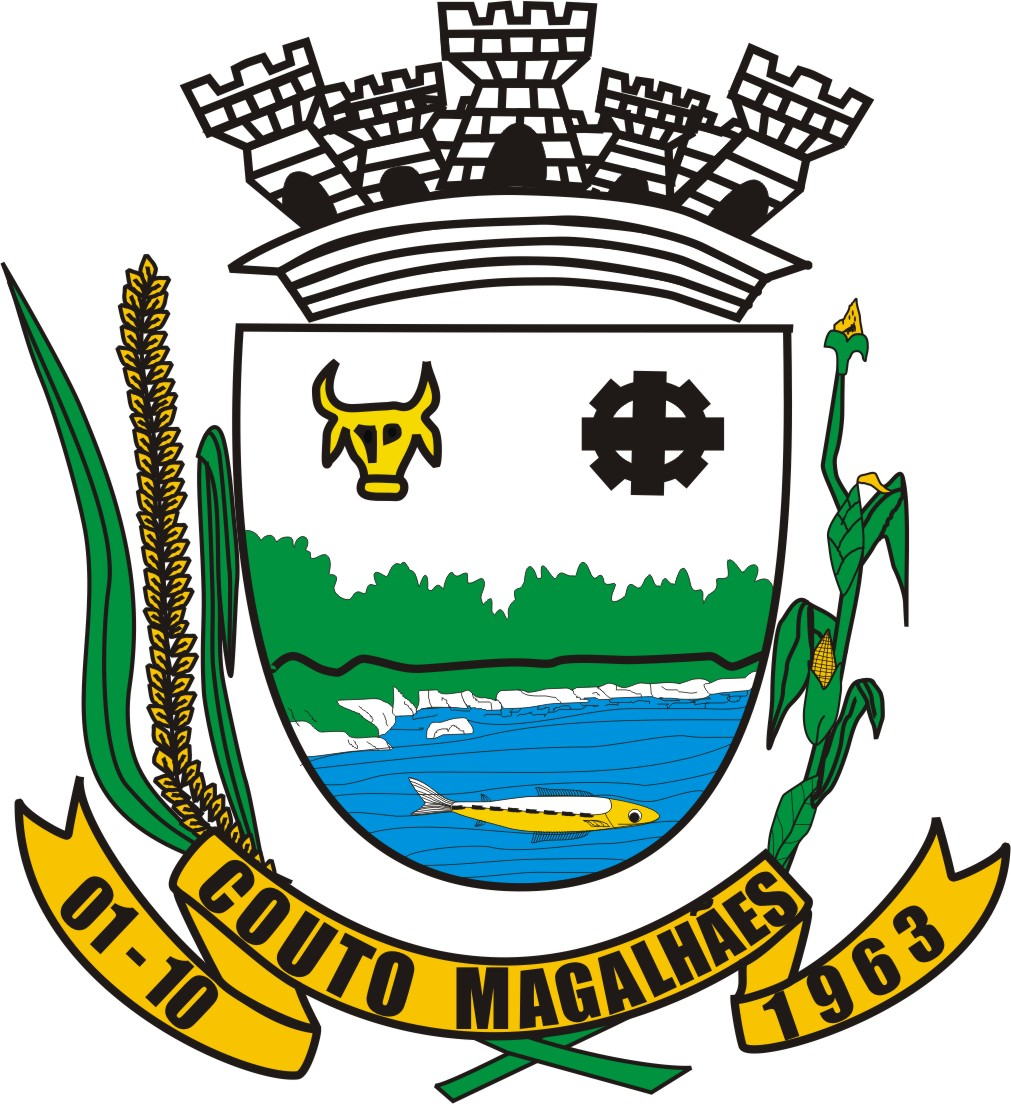
- Flag Coat of arms

- Location of Couto Magalhães in the State of Tocantins

- Country: Brazil
- Region: North
- State: Tocantins

Area
  - Total: 1,586 km^{2} (612 sq mi)
- Elevation: 230 m (750 ft)

Population (2020)
  - Total: 5,639
  - Density: 3.07/km^{2} (8.0/sq mi)
- Time zone: UTC−3 (BRT)
- Human Development Index: 0.628

Couto Magalhães is a municipality located in the Brazilian state of Tocantins. Its population was 5,639 (2020) and its area is 1,586 km^{2} (612.4 mi^{2}), a density of 3.07 people/km^{2} (8 people/mi^{2}). It is located 150 m (492.1 ft) above sea level. The demonym is Coutense.

== See also ==
- List of municipalities in Tocantins
