= São Miguel do Tocantins =

Municipality in Tocantins, Brazil

Coordinates: 5°30′S 47°23′W

São Miguel do Tocantins Saint Michael of Tocantins
- Municipality
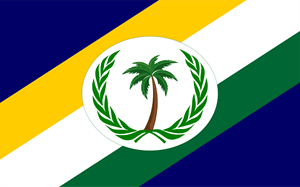
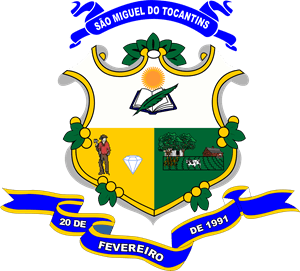
- Flag Coat of arms
- Interactive map of São Miguel do Tocantins
- Country: Brazil
- Region: Northern
- State: Tocantins
- Mesoregion: Ocidental do Tocantins

Population (2020)
  - Total: 12,294
- Time zone: UTC−3 (BRT)

São Michael of Tocantins is a municipality in the state of Tocantins in the Northern region of Brazil.

== See also ==
- List of municipalities in Tocantins
