= Nova Olinda, Tocantins =

Municipality in Tocantins, Brazil

Nova Olinda
- Municipality
- The Municipality of Nova Olinda
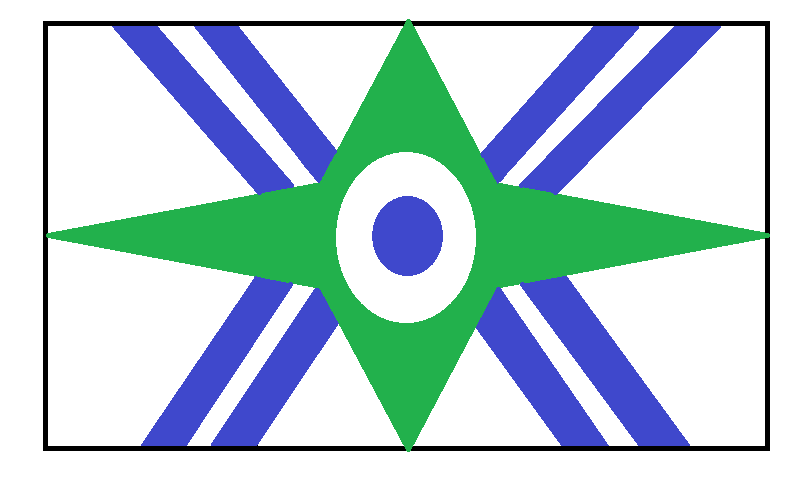
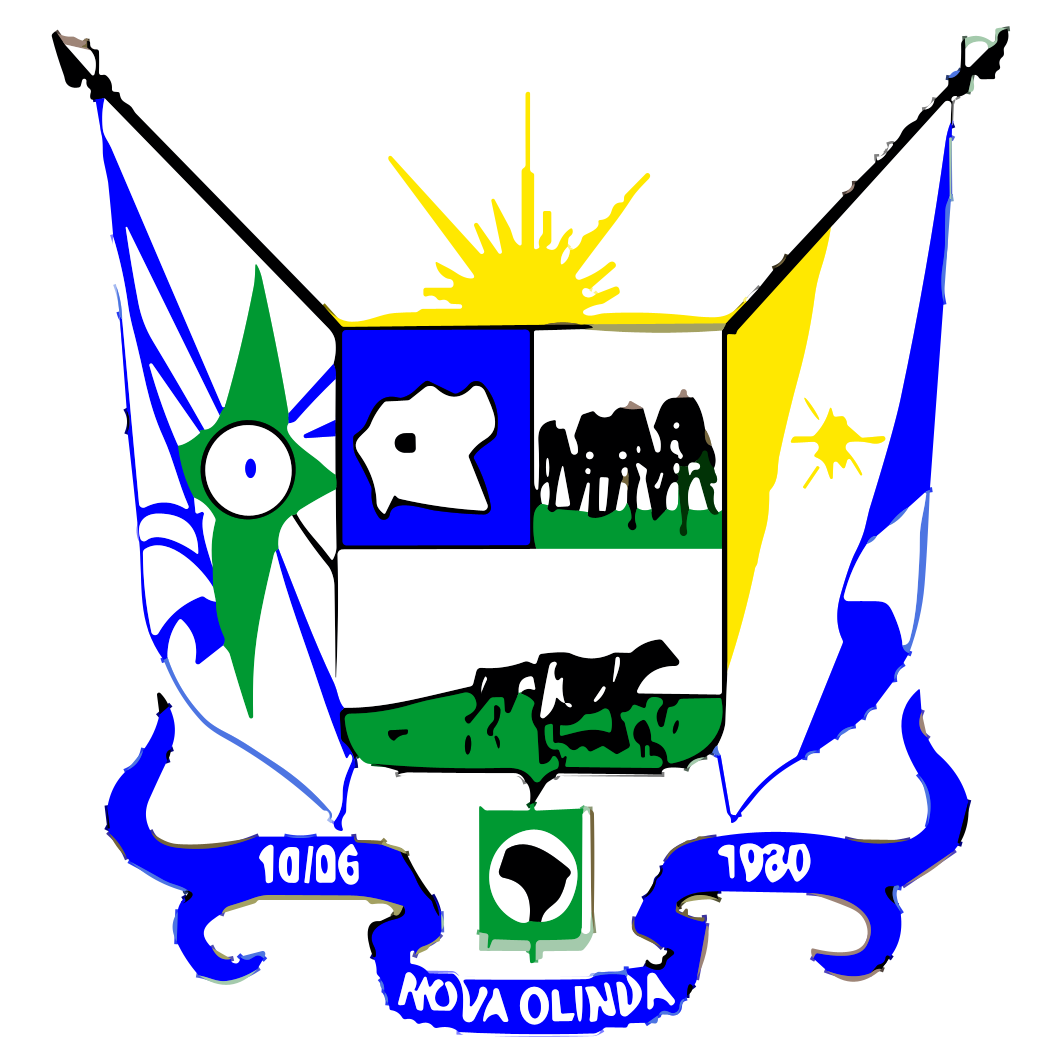
- Flag Coat of arms

- Location of Nova Olinda in the State of Tocantins
- Coordinates: 07°37′55″S 48°25′22″W
- Country: Brazil
- Region: North
- State: Tocantins
- Founded: June 10, 1980

Government
  - Mayor: Aparecida Vaz Rodrigues (DEM)

Area
  - Total: 1,566.237 km^{2} (604.727 sq mi)
- Elevation: 257 m (843 ft)

Population (2020)
  - Total: 11,917
  - Density: 7.6087/km^{2} (19.706/sq mi)
- Time zone: UTC−3 (BRT)
- HDI (2000): 0.643 – medium
- Website: www.novaolinda.to.gov.br

Nova Olinda is a municipality located in the Brazilian state of Tocantins.

== See also ==
- List of municipalities in Tocantins
