= Santa Maria do Tocantins =

Municipality in Tocantins, Brazil

- Municipality
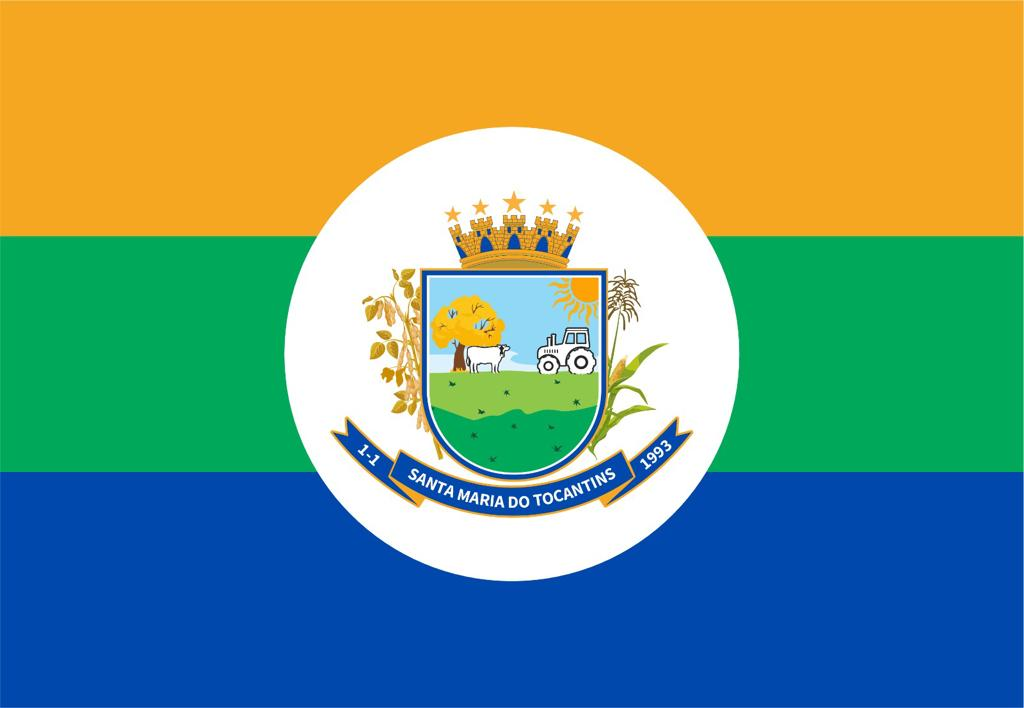
- Flag

- Location in Brazil
- Coordinates: 8°47′49″S 47°47′42″W
- Country: Brazil
- Region: Northern
- State: Tocantins
- Mesoregion: Oriental do Tocantins

Population (2020)
  - Total: 3,486
- Time zone: UTC−3 (BRT)

Santa Maria do Tocantins is a municipality in the state of Tocantins in the Northern region of Brazil.

== See also ==
- List of municipalities in Tocantins
