= Paranã =

Municipality in Tocantins, Brazil

- Municipality
- The Municipality of Paranã
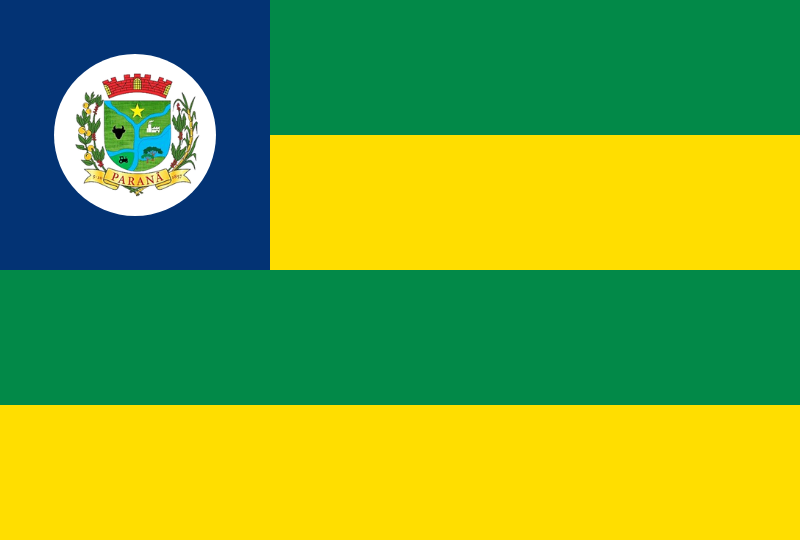
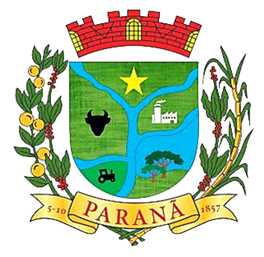
- Flag Coat of arms

- Location of Paranã in the state of Tocantins

- Location of Paranã in Brazil
- Coordinates: 12°36′54″S 47°52′58″W
- Country: Brazil
- Region: North
- State: Tocantins

Government
  - Mayor: Edson Nunes Lustosa

Area
  - Total: 11,260.151 km^{2} (4,347.569 sq mi)
- Elevation: 274 m (899 ft)

Population (2020)
  - Total: 10,437
  - Density: 0.9/km^{2} (2.3/sq mi)
- Time zone: UTC−3 (BRT)
- HDI (2000): 0.630 – medium

Paranã (formerly known as São João da Palma) is a municipality in the state of Tocantins in the Northern region of Brazil.

== See also ==
- List of municipalities in Tocantins
