= Miranorte =

Municipality in Tocantins, Brazil

Coordinates: 9°29′S 48°29′W

- Municipality
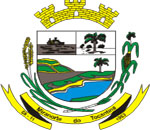
- Flag Coat of arms
- Interactive map of Miranorte
- Country: Brazil
- Region: Northern
- State: Tocantins
- Mesoregion: Ocidental do Tocantins

Population (2020)
  - Total: 13,493
- Time zone: UTC−3 (BRT)

Miranorte is a municipality in the state of Tocantins in the Northern region of Brazil.

== See also ==
- List of municipalities in Tocantins
