= Cariri do Tocantins =

Municipality in Tocantins, Brazil

- Municipality
- Location in Tocantins state

- Location in Brazil
- Coordinates: 11°53′27″S 49°9′39″W
- Country: Brazil
- Region: North
- State: Tocantins

Area
  - Total: 1,129 km^{2} (436 sq mi)

Population (2020)
  - Total: 4,441
  - Density: 3.934/km^{2} (10.19/sq mi)
- Time zone: UTC−3 (BRT)

Cariri do Tocantins is a municipality located in the Brazilian state of Tocantins. Its population was 4,441 (2020) and its area is 1,129 km^{2}.

== See also ==
- List of municipalities in Tocantins
