= Combinado =

Municipality in Tocantins, Brazil

- Municipality
- Flag

- Location in Tocantins state

- Location in Brazil
- Coordinates: 12°47′31″S 46°32′20″W
- Country: Brazil
- Region: North
- State: Tocantins

Area
  - Total: 210 km^{2} (81 sq mi)

Population (2020)
  - Total: 4,756
  - Density: 23/km^{2} (59/sq mi)
- Time zone: UTC−3 (BRT)

Combinado is a municipality located in the Brazilian state of Tocantins. Its population was 4,756 (2022) and its area is 210 km^{2}.

== See also ==
- List of municipalities in Tocantins
