= Ponte Alta do Bom Jesus =

Municipality in Tocantins, Brazil

Coordinates: 12°09′S 46°24′W

- Municipality
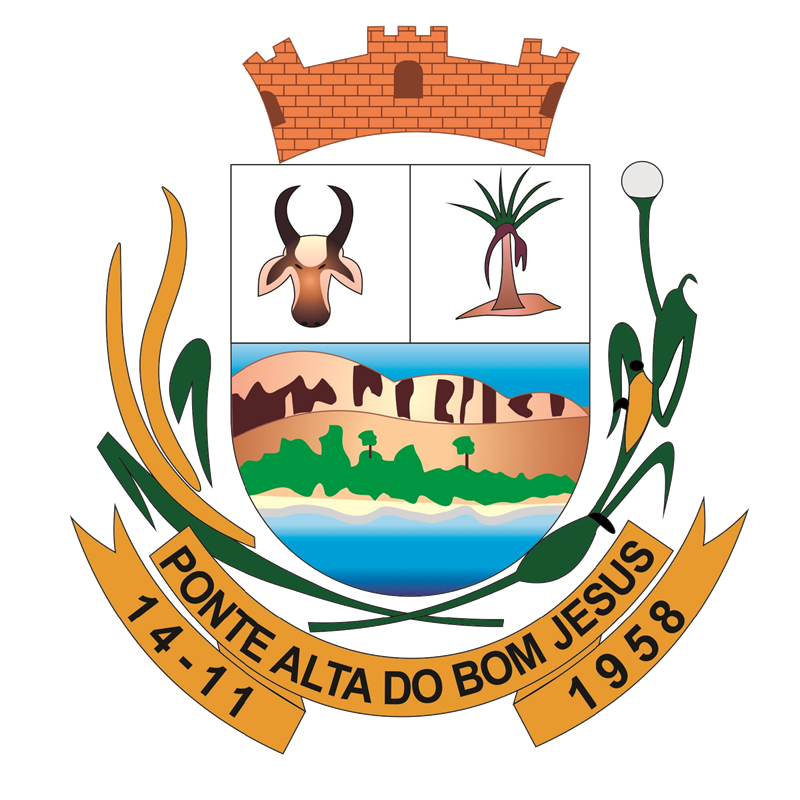
- Coat of arms
- Interactive map of Ponte Alta do Bom Jesus
- Country: Brazil
- Region: Northern
- State: Tocantins
- Mesoregion: Oriental do Tocantins

Population (2020)
  - Total: 4,591
- Time zone: UTC−3 (BRT)

Ponte Alta do Bom Jesus is a municipality in the state of Tocantins in the Northern region of Brazil.

== See also ==
- List of municipalities in Tocantins
