= Talismã =

Municipality in Tocantins, Brazil

Coordinates: 6°31′S 37°29′W

- Municipality
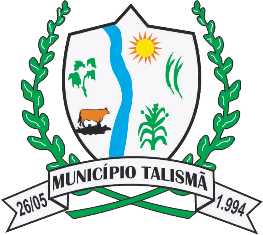
- Coat of arms
- Interactive map of Talismã
- Country: Brazil
- Region: Northern
- State: Tocantins
- Mesoregion: Ocidental do Tocantins

Population (2020)
  - Total: 2,812
- Time zone: UTC−3 (BRT)

Talismã is a municipality in the state of Tocantins in the Northern region of Brazil.

== See also ==
- List of municipalities in Tocantins
