= Barrolândia =

Municipality in Tocantins, Brazil

- Municipality
- Location in Tocantins state

- Location in Brazil
- Coordinates: 9°50′9″S 48°43′30″W
- Country: Brazil
- Region: North
- State: Tocantins

Area
  - Total: 713 km^{2} (275 sq mi)

Population (2020)
  - Total: 5,651
  - Density: 7.93/km^{2} (20.5/sq mi)
- Time zone: UTC−3 (BRT)

Barrolândia is a municipality located in the Brazilian state of Tocantins. Its population was 5,651 in 2020 and its area is 713 km^{2}.

== See also ==
- List of municipalities in Tocantins
