= Buriti do Tocantins =

Municipality in Tocantins, Brazil

- Municipality
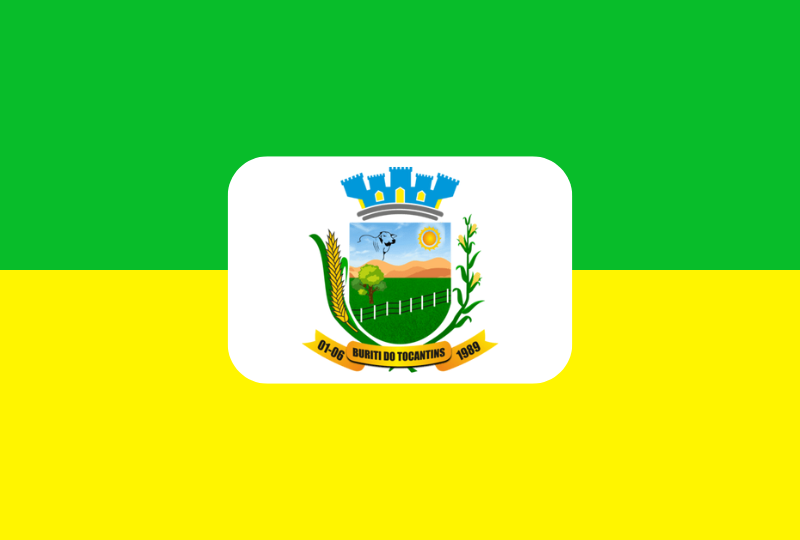
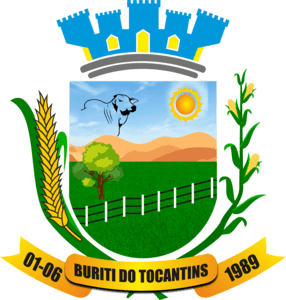
- Flag Coat of arms

- Location in Tocantins state

- Location in Brazil
- Coordinates: 5°18′57″S 48°13′44″W
- Country: Brazil
- Region: North
- State: Tocantins

Area
  - Total: 252 km^{2} (97 sq mi)

Population (2020)
  - Total: 11,497
  - Density: 45.6/km^{2} (118/sq mi)
- Time zone: UTC−3 (BRT)

Buriti do Tocantins is a municipality located in the Brazilian state of Tocantins. Its population was 11,497 (2020) and its area is 252 km^{2}.

== See also ==
- List of municipalities in Tocantins
