= Pindorama do Tocantins =

Municipality in Tocantins, Brazil

Coordinates: 11°10′S 47°28′W

- Municipality
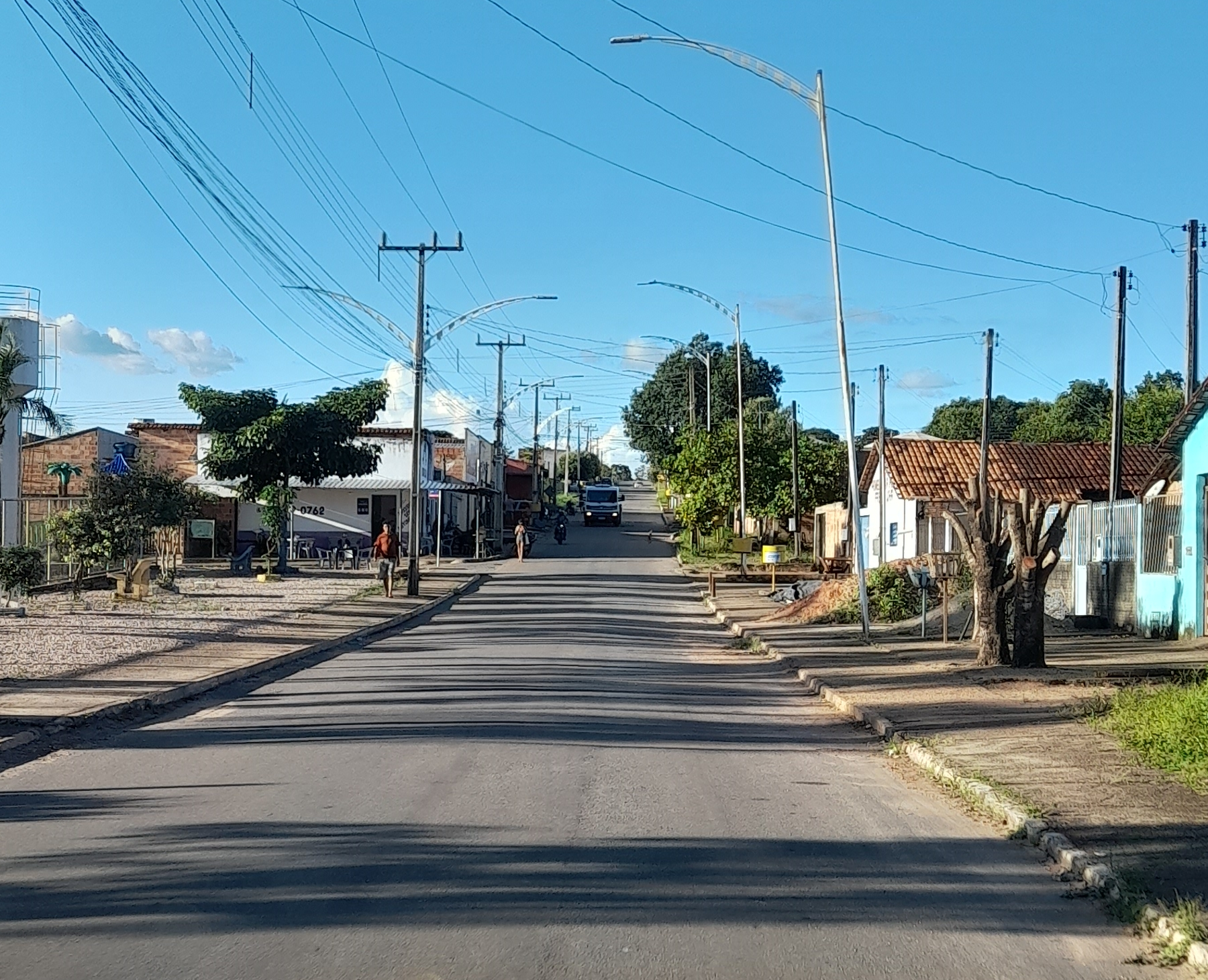
- A street in the center of the city in May 2025.

- Location in Tocantins
- Country: Brazil
- Region: Northern
- State: Tocantins
- Mesoregion: Oriental do Tocantins

Population (2020)
  - Total: 4,430
- Time zone: UTC−3 (BRT)

Pindorama do Tocantins is a municipality in the state of Tocantins in the Northern region of Brazil.

== See also ==
- List of municipalities in Tocantins
