= Colméia =

Municipality in Tocantins, Brazil

- Municipality
- Flag Coat of arms

- Location in Tocantins state

- Location in Brazil
- Coordinates: 08°43′44″S 48°45′54″W
- Country: Brazil
- Region: North
- State: Tocantins

Area
  - Total: 991 km^{2} (383 sq mi)

Population (2020)
  - Total: 8,141
  - Density: 8.21/km^{2} (21.3/sq mi)
- Time zone: UTC−3 (BRT)

Colméia is a municipality located in the Brazilian state of Tocantins. Its population was 8,141 (2020) and its area is 991 km^{2}. "Colméia" translated to English means beehive.

== See also ==
- List of municipalities in Tocantins
