= Sandolândia =

Municipality in Tocantins, Brazil

Coordinates: 12°31′S 49°53′W

- Municipality
- Interactive map of Sandolândia
- Country: Brazil
- Region: Northern
- State: Tocantins
- Mesoregion: Ocidental do Tocantins

Population (2020)
  - Total: 3,373
- Time zone: UTC−3 (BRT)

Sandolândia is a municipality in the state of Tocantins in the Northern region of Brazil.

== See also ==
- List of municipalities in Tocantins
