= Palmeiras do Tocantins =

Municipality in Tocantins, Brazil

Coordinates: 6.61278°S 47.5458°W

- Municipality
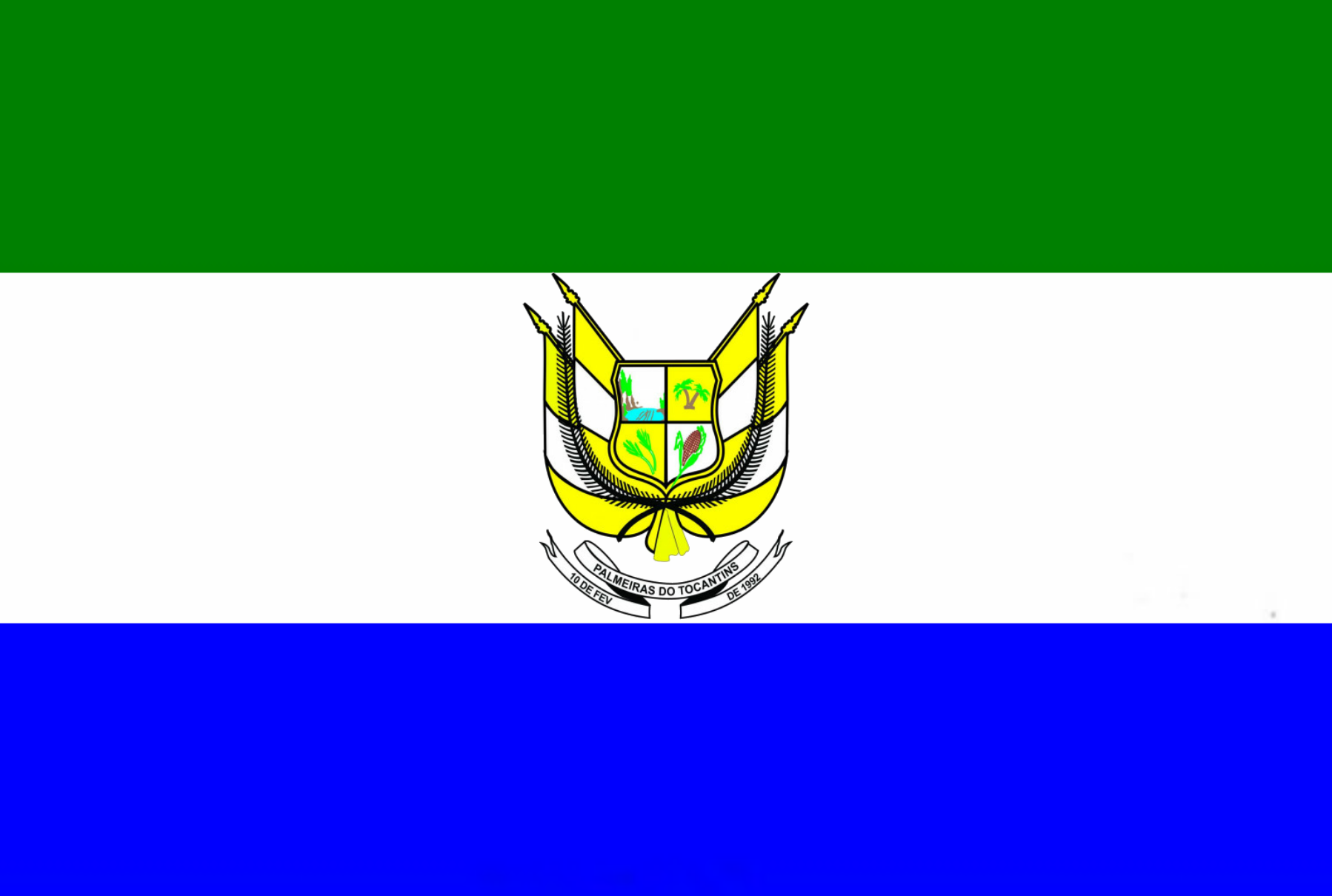
- Flag
- Interactive map of Palmeiras do Tocantins
- Country: Brazil
- Region: Northern
- State: Tocantins
- Mesoregion: Ocidental do Tocantins

Population (2020)
  - Total: 6,745
- Time zone: UTC−3 (BRT)

Palmeiras do Tocantins is a municipality in the state of Tocantins in the Northern region of Brazil.

== See also ==
- List of municipalities in Tocantins
