= Darcinópolis =

Municipality in Tocantins, Brazil

- Municipality
- Location in Tocantins state

- Location in Brazil
- Coordinates: 06°42′47″S 47°45′35″W
- Country: Brazil
- Region: North
- State: Tocantins
- Settled: 5 October 1989

Government
  - Mayor: Jackson Soares Marinho (MDB)

Area
  - Total: 1,639 km^{2} (633 sq mi)
- Elevation: 289 m (948 ft)

Population (2022)
  - Total: 5,827
  - Density: 3.555/km^{2} (9.208/sq mi)
- Time zone: UTC−3 (BRT)
- Postal code: 77910-000
- Area code: +55 63
- HDI (2000): 0,621 – medium
- Website: https://darcinopolis.to.gov.br/

Darcinópolis is a Brazilian municipality in the state of Tocantins. In 2020, the estimated population was 6,174. It has an area of 1,639 km^{2}.

== See also ==
- List of municipalities in Tocantins
