= Augustinópolis =

Municipality in Tocantins, Brazil

- Municipality
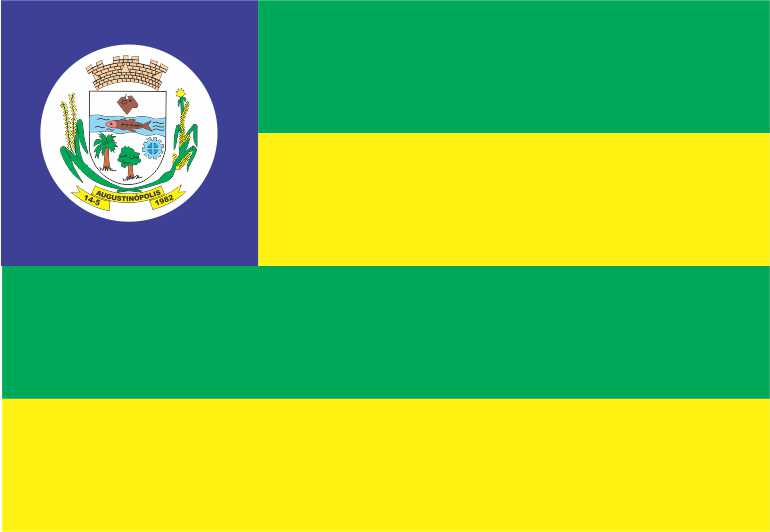
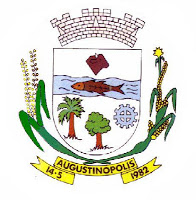
- Flag Coat of arms

- Location in Tocantins state

- Location in Brazil
- Coordinates: 5°27′57″S 47°53′16″W
- Country: Brazil
- Region: North
- State: Tocantins

Area
  - Total: 395 km^{2} (153 sq mi)

Population (2020)
  - Total: 18,643
  - Density: 47.2/km^{2} (122/sq mi)
- Time zone: UTC−3 (BRT)

Augustinópolis is a municipality located in the Brazilian state of Tocantins. Its population was 18,643 (2020) and its area is 395 km^{2}.

== See also ==
- List of municipalities in Tocantins
