= Luzinópolis =

Municipality in Tocantins, Brazil

Coordinates: 6.18194°S 47.8558°W

- Municipality
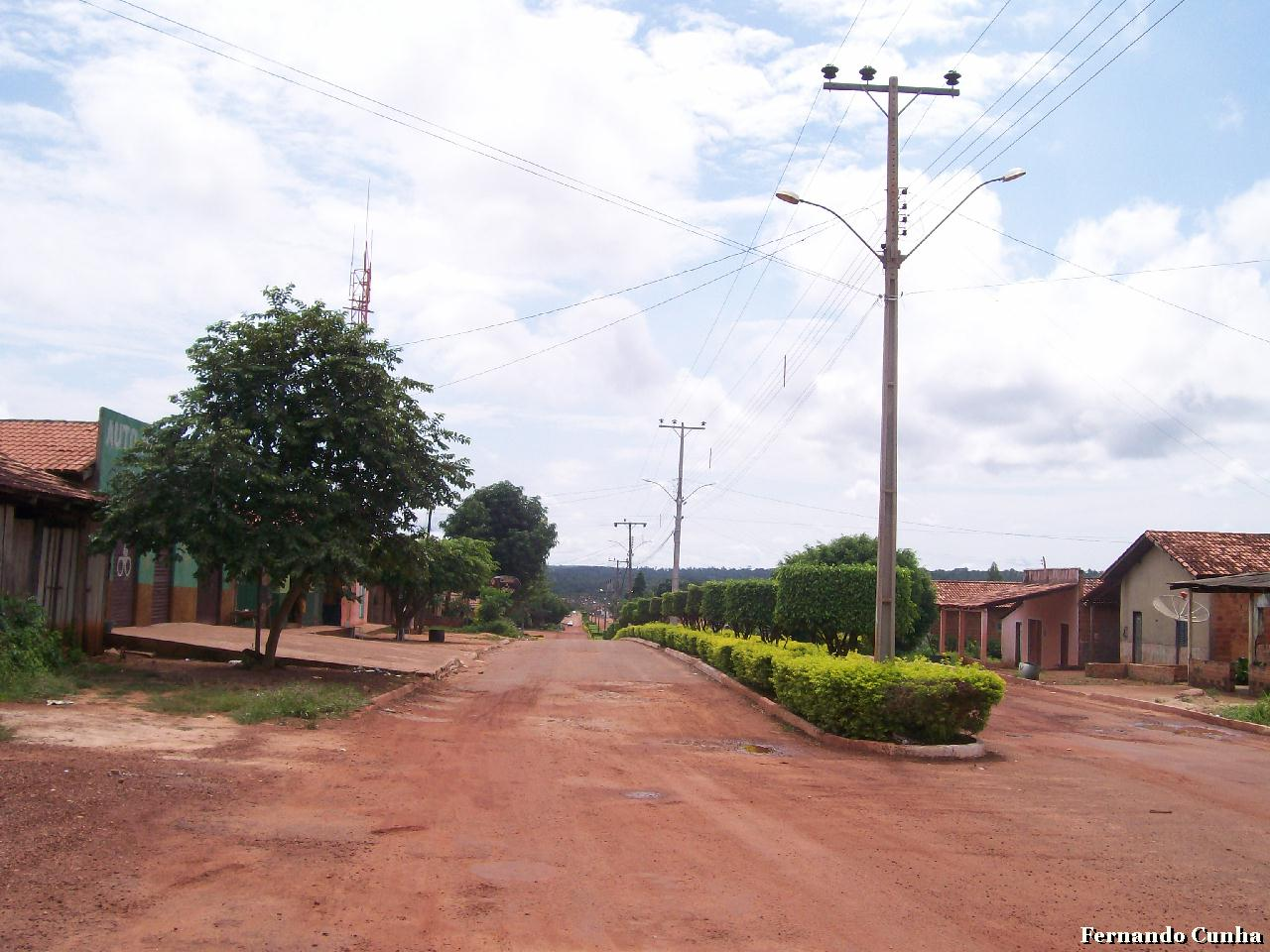
- Interactive map of Luzinópolis
- Country: Brazil
- Region: Northern
- State: Tocantins
- Mesoregion: Ocidental do Tocantins

Population (2020)
  - Total: 3,154
- Time zone: UTC−3 (BRT)

Luzinópolis is a municipality in the state of Tocantins in the Northern region of Brazil.

== See also ==
- List of municipalities in Tocantins
