= Brasilândia do Tocantins =

Municipality in Tocantins, Brazil

- Municipality
- Location in Tocantins state

- Location in Brazil
- Coordinates: 8°23′16″S 48°28′51″W
- Country: Brazil
- Region: North
- State: Tocantins

Area
  - Total: 641 km^{2} (247 sq mi)

Population (2020)
  - Total: 2,211
  - Density: 3.45/km^{2} (8.93/sq mi)
- Time zone: UTC−3 (BRT)

Brasilândia do Tocantins is a municipality located in the Brazilian state of Tocantins. Its population was 2,211 (2020) and its area is 641 km^{2}.

== See also ==
- List of municipalities in Tocantins
