= Oliveira de Fátima =

Municipality in Tocantins, Brazil

Coordinates: 10.7078°S 48.9069°W

- Municipality
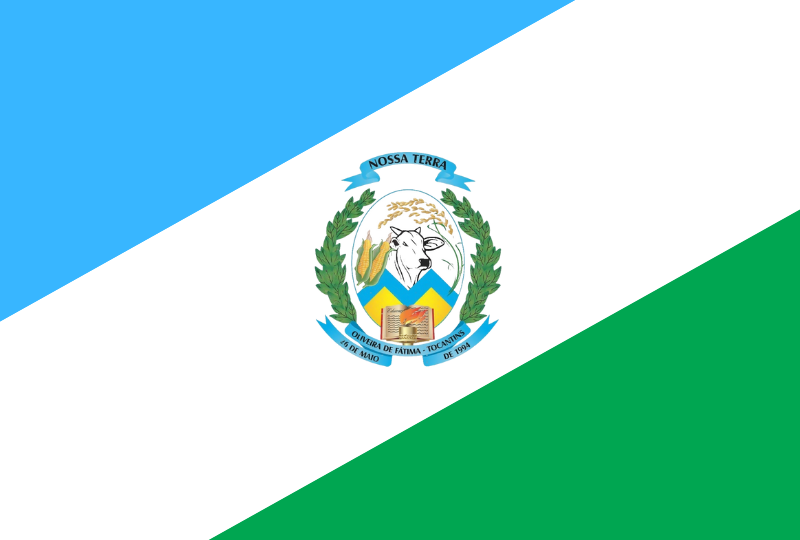
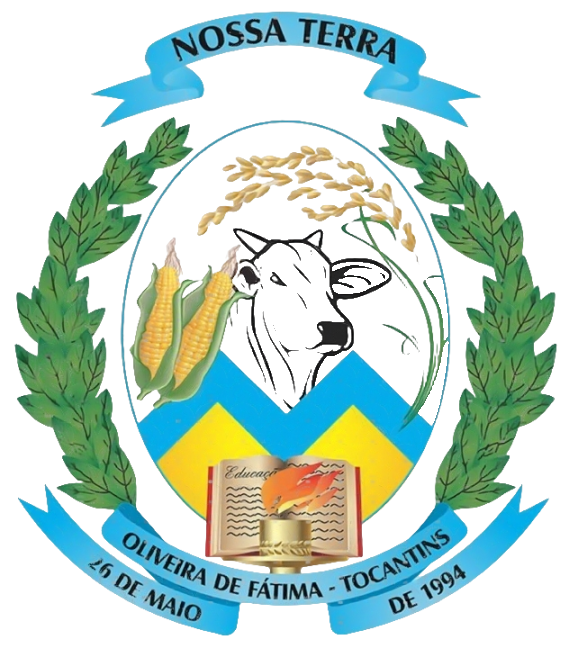
- Flag Coat of arms
- Interactive map of Oliveira de Fátima
- Country: Brazil
- Region: Northern
- State: Tocantins
- Mesoregion: Ocidental do Tocantins

Population (2020)
  - Total: 1,118
- Time zone: UTC−3 (BRT)

Oliveira de Fátima is a municipality in the state of Tocantins in the Northern region of Brazil.

== See also ==
- List of municipalities in Tocantins
