= Silvanópolis =

Municipality in Tocantins, Brazil

Coordinates: 11°10′S 48°05′W

- Municipality
- Flag
- Interactive map of Silvanópolis
- Country: Brazil
- Region: Northern
- State: Tocantins
- Mesoregion: Oriental do Tocantins

Population (2020)
  - Total: 5,428
- Time zone: UTC−3 (BRT)

Silvanópolis is a municipality in the state of Tocantins in the Northern region of Brazil.

== See also ==
- List of municipalities in Tocantins
