= Pequizeiro =

Municipality in Tocantins, Brazil

Coordinates: 8.595°S 48.9339°W

- Municipality
- Interactive map of Pequizeiro
- Country: Brazil
- Region: Northern
- State: Tocantins
- Mesoregion: Ocidental do Tocantins

Population (2020)
  - Total: 5,512
- Time zone: UTC−3 (BRT)

Pequizeiro is a municipality in the state of Tocantins in the Northern region of Brazil.

== See also ==
- List of municipalities in Tocantins
