= Brejinho de Nazaré =

Municipality in Tocantins, Brazil

- Municipality
- Location in Tocantins state

- Location in Brazil
- Coordinates: 11°0′0″S 48°33′57″W
- Country: Brazil
- Region: North
- State: Tocantins

Area
  - Total: 1,724 km^{2} (666 sq mi)

Population (2020)
  - Total: 5,519
  - Density: 3.201/km^{2} (8.291/sq mi)
- Time zone: UTC−3 (BRT)

Brejinho de Nazaré is a municipality located in the Brazilian state of Tocantins. Its population was 5,519 (2020) and its area is 1,724 km^{2}.

== See also ==
- List of municipalities in Tocantins
