= Nova Rosalândia =

Municipality in Tocantins, Brazil

Coordinates: 10°34′S 48°50′W

- Municipality
- Flag
- Interactive map of Nova Rosalândia
- Country: Brazil
- Region: Northern
- State: Tocantins
- Mesoregion: Ocidental do Tocantins

Population (2020)
  - Total: 4,304
- Time zone: UTC−3 (BRT)

Nova Rosalândia is a municipality in the state of Tocantins in the Northern region of Brazil.

== See also ==
- List of municipalities in Tocantins
