= Bernardo Sayão =

Municipality in Tocantins, Brazil

- Municipality
- Location in Tocantins state

- Location in Brazil
- Coordinates: 7°52′26″S 48°53′16″W
- Country: Brazil
- Region: North
- State: Tocantins

Area
  - Total: 927 km^{2} (358 sq mi)

Population (2020)
  - Total: 4,448
  - Density: 4.80/km^{2} (12.4/sq mi)
- Time zone: UTC−3 (BRT)

Bernardo Sayão is a municipality located in the Brazilian state of Tocantins. Its population was 4,448 (2020) and its area is 927 km^{2}.

== See also ==
- List of municipalities in Tocantins
