= Centenário, Tocantins =

Municipality in Tocantins, Brazil

Centenário
- Municipality
- Location in Tocantins state

- Location in Brazil
- Coordinates: 08°57′03″S 47°20′09″W
- Country: Brazil
- Region: North
- State: Tocantins

Population (2020)
  - Total: 2,936
- Time zone: UTC−3 (BRT)

Centenário is a municipality located in the Brazilian state of Tocantins. Its population was 2,936 (2020) and its area is 1,955 km^{2}.

== See also ==
- List of municipalities in Tocantins
