= Goianorte =

Municipality in Tocantins, Brazil

Coordinates: 8°44′S 48°49′W

- Municipality
- Interactive map of Goianorte
- Country: Brazil
- Region: Northern
- State: Tocantins
- Mesoregion: Ocidental do Tocantins

Population (2020)
  - Total: 5,130
- Time zone: UTC−3 (BRT)

Goianorte is a municipality in the state of Tocantins in the Northern region of Brazil.

== See also ==
- List of municipalities in Tocantins
