= Rio Sono =

Municipality in Tocantins, Brazil

- Municipality
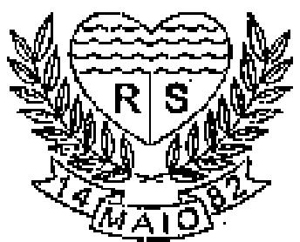
- Coat of arms
- Interactive map of Rio Sono
- Coordinates: 9°21′S 47°45′W
- Country: Brazil
- Region: Northern
- State: Tocantins
- Mesoregion: Oriental do Tocantins

Population (2020)
  - Total: 6,488
- Time zone: UTC−3 (BRT)

Rio Sono is a municipality in the state of Tocantins in the Northern region of Brazil.

== See also ==
- List of municipalities in Tocantins
