= Axixá do Tocantins =

Municipality in Tocantins, Brazil

- Municipality
- The Municipality of Axixá do Tocantins
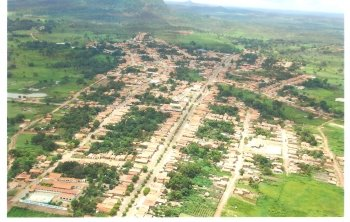
- Aerial view of Axixá do Tocantins

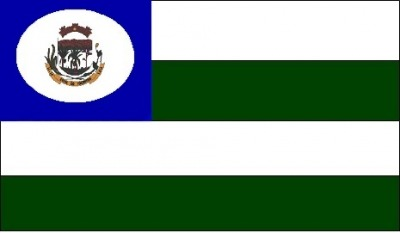
- Flag

- Location of Axixá do Tocantins in the State of Tocantins
- Coordinates: 05°37′01″S 47°46′08″W
- Country: Brazil
- Region: North
- State: Tocantins
- Founded: October 14, 1964

Government
  - Mayor: Ruidiad Sousa Brito (PT)

Area
  - Total: 150.214 km^{2} (57.998 sq mi)
- Elevation: 210 m (690 ft)

Population (2020)
  - Total: 9,787
  - Density: 65.15/km^{2} (168.7/sq mi)
- Time zone: UTC−3 (BRT)
- HDI (2000): 0.571 – medium
- Website: www.axixa.to.gov.br

Axixá do Tocantins is a municipality located in the Brazilian state of Tocantins. Its population in 2020 was 9,787 and its area is 150 km^{2}. It is the smallest municipality in that state by area.

== See also ==
- List of municipalities in Tocantins
