= Crixás do Tocantins =

Municipality in Tocantins, Brazil

- Municipality
- Location in Tocantins state

- Location in Brazil
- Coordinates: 11°06′00″S 48°55′08″W
- Country: Brazil
- Region: North
- State: Tocantins

Population (2020)
  - Total: 1,735
- Time zone: UTC−3 (BRT)

Crixás do Tocantins is a municipality located in the Brazilian state of Tocantins. Its population was 1,735 (2020) and its area is 987 km^{2}.

== See also ==
- List of municipalities in Tocantins
