= Santa Rosa do Tocantins =

Municipality in Tocantins, Brazil

Coordinates: 11°30′S 48°04′W

- Municipality
- Flag
- Interactive map of Santa Rosa do Tocantins
- Country: Brazil
- Region: Northern
- State: Tocantins
- Mesoregion: Oriental do Tocantins

Population (2020)
  - Total: 4,846
- Time zone: UTC−3 (BRT)

Santa Rosa do Tocantins is a municipality in the state of Tocantins in the Northern region of Brazil.

== See also ==
- List of municipalities in Tocantins
