= Araguatins =

Municipality in Tocantins, Brazil

- Municipality
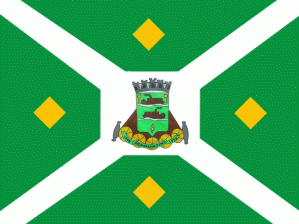
- Flag

- Location in Tocantins state

- Location in Brazil
- Coordinates: 5°39′3″S 48°7′26″W
- Country: Brazil
- Region: North
- State: Tocantins
- Founded: June 9, 1868 (as name for São Vincente do Araguaia, current name changed from 1943)

Government
  - Mayor: Claudio Carneiro Santana (PMDB)

Area
  - Total: 2,627.28 km^{2} (1,014.40 sq mi)
- Elevation: 103 m (338 ft)

Population (2020)
  - Total: 36,170
  - Density: 13.77/km^{2} (35.66/sq mi)
- Time zone: UTC−3 (BRT)

Araguatins is a municipality located in the Brazilian state of Tocantins. Its population was 36,170 (2020) and its area is 2,625 km^{2}.

== See also ==
- List of municipalities in Tocantins
