= Chapada da Natividade =

Municipality in Tocantins, Brazil

- Municipality
- Location in Tocantins state

- Location in Brazil
- Coordinates: 11°37′01″S 47°45′03″W
- Country: Brazil
- Region: North
- State: Tocantins

Area
  - Total: 1,671 km^{2} (645 sq mi)

Population (2020)
  - Total: 3,331
  - Density: 1.993/km^{2} (5.163/sq mi)
- Time zone: UTC−3 (BRT)

Chapada da Natividade is a municipality located in the Brazilian state of Tocantins. Its population was 3,331 (2020) and its area is 1,671 km^{2}.

== See also ==
- List of municipalities in Tocantins
