= Pau d'Arco, Tocantins =

Municipality in Tocantins, Brazil

Pau d'Arco
- Municipality
- Location in Brazil
- Coordinates: 7°32′23″S 49°22′20″W
- Country: Brazil
- Region: Northern
- State: Tocantins
- Mesoregion: Ocidental do Tocantins

Population (2020)
  - Total: 4,867
- Time zone: UTC−3 (BRT)

Pau d'Arco is a municipality in the state of Tocantins in the Northern region of Brazil.

== See also ==
- List of municipalities in Tocantins
