= Porto Alegre do Tocantins =

Municipality in Tocantins, Brazil

Coordinates: 11°41′S 46°59′W

- Municipality
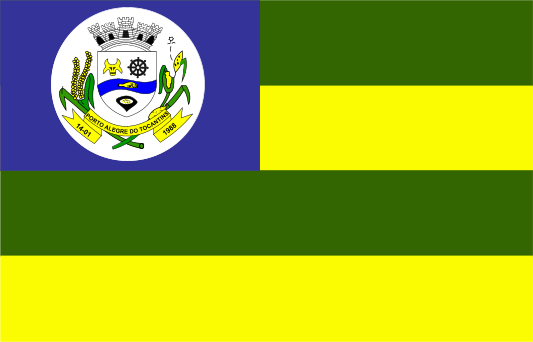
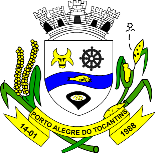
- Flag Coat of arms
- Interactive map of Porto Alegre do Tocantins
- Country: Brazil
- Region: Northern
- State: Tocantins
- Mesoregion: Oriental do Tocantins

Population (2020)
  - Total: 3,170
- Time zone: UTC−3 (BRT)

Porto Alegre do Tocantins is a municipality in the state of Tocantins in the Northern region of Brazil.

== See also ==
- List of municipalities in Tocantins
