= Angico =

Municipality in Tocantins, Brazil

- Municipality
- Flag Coat of arms

- Location in Tocantins state

- Location in Brazil
- Coordinates: 6°23′24″S 47°51′54″W
- Country: Brazil
- Region: North
- State: Tocantins

Area
  - Total: 452 km^{2} (175 sq mi)

Population (2020)
  - Total: 3,454
  - Density: 7.64/km^{2} (19.8/sq mi)
- Time zone: UTC−3 (BRT)

Angico is a municipality located in the Brazilian state of Tocantins. Its population was 3,454 (2020) and its area is 452 km^{2}.

== See also ==
- List of municipalities in Tocantins
