= Araguaçu =

Municipality in Tocantins, Brazil

- Municipality
- Location in Tocantins state

- Location in Brazil
- Coordinates: 12°55′51″S 49°49′33″W
- Country: Brazil
- Region: North
- State: Tocantins

Area
  - Total: 5,168 km^{2} (1,995 sq mi)

Population (2020)
  - Total: 8,467
  - Density: 1.638/km^{2} (4.243/sq mi)
- Time zone: UTC−3 (BRT)

Araguaçu is a municipality located in the Brazilian state of Tocantins. Its population was 8,467 (2020) and its area is 5,168 km^{2}.

== See also ==
- List of municipalities in Tocantins
