= Cachoeirinha, Tocantins =

Municipality in Tocantins, Brazil

Cachoeirinha
- Municipality
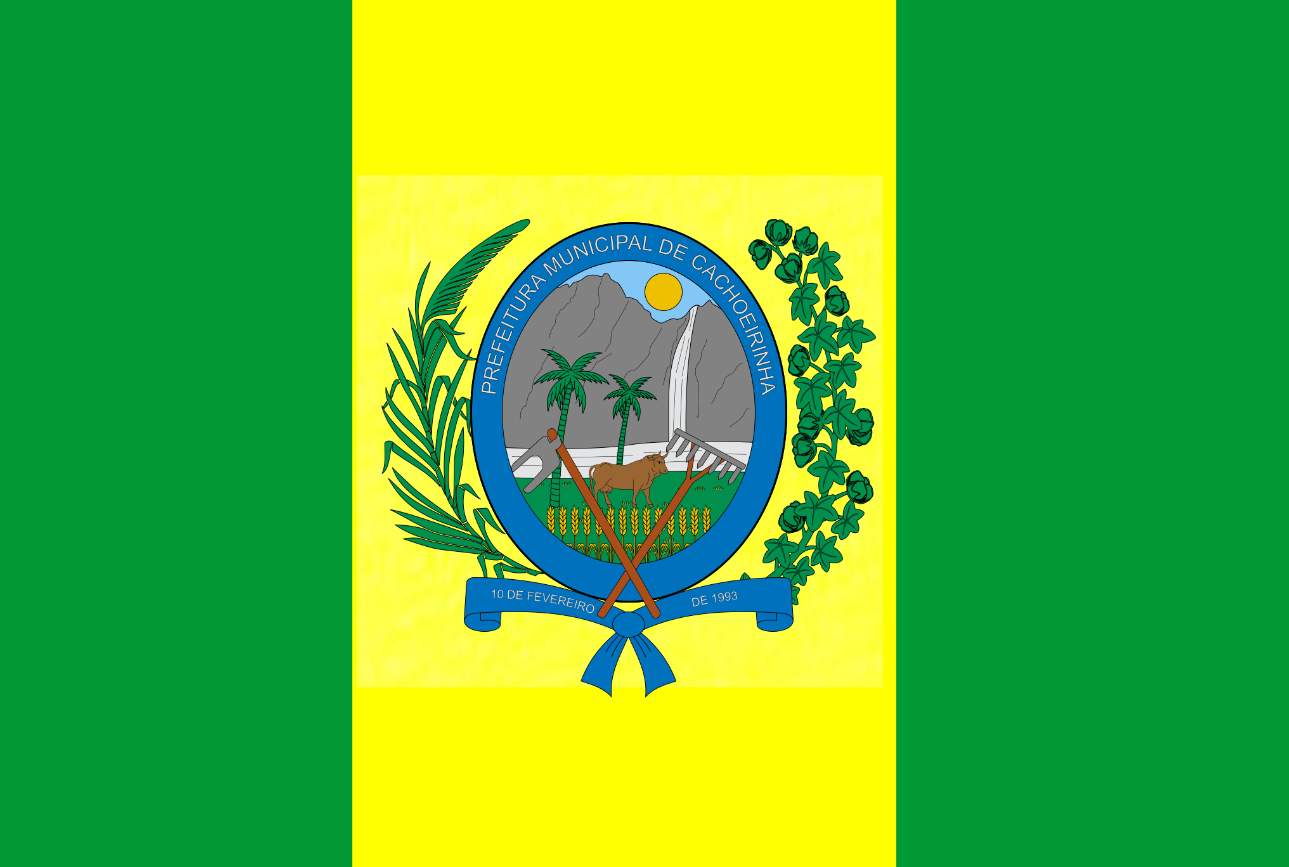
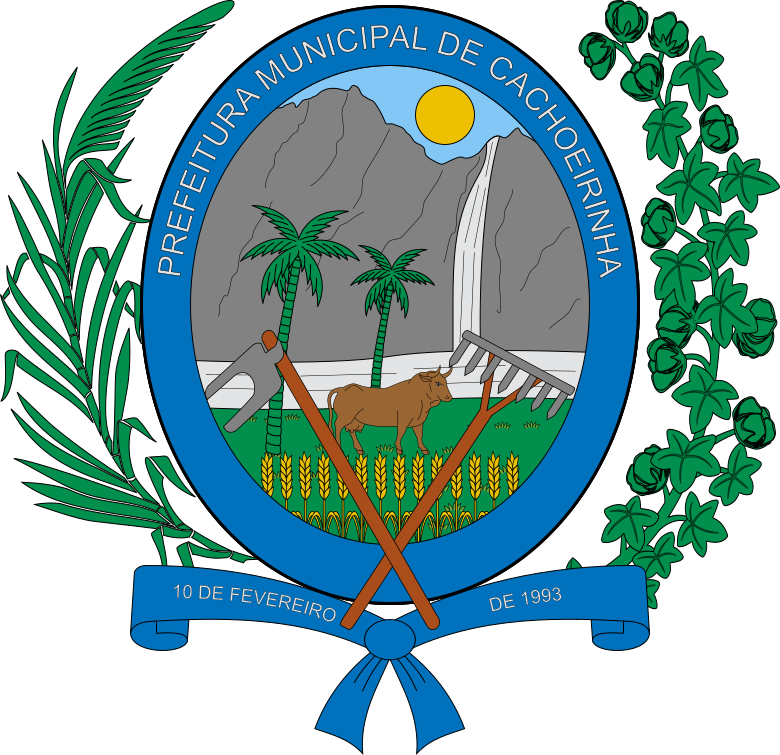
- Flag Coat of arms

- Location in Tocantins state

- Location in Brazil
- Coordinates: 6°7′19″S 47°55′19″W
- Country: Brazil
- Region: North
- State: Tocantins

Area
  - Total: 352 km^{2} (136 sq mi)

Population (2020)
  - Total: 2,284
  - Density: 6.49/km^{2} (16.8/sq mi)
- Time zone: UTC−3 (BRT)

Cachoeirinha is a municipality located in the Brazilian state of Tocantins. Its population was 2,284 (2020) and its area is 352 km^{2}.

== See also ==
- List of municipalities in Tocantins
