= Novo Jardim =

Municipality in Tocantins, Brazil

Coordinates: 11°52′S 46°34′W

- Municipality
- Interactive map of Novo Jardim
- Country: Brazil
- Region: Northern
- State: Tocantins
- Mesoregion: Oriental do Tocantins

Population (2020)
  - Total: 2,745
- Time zone: UTC−3 (BRT)

Novo Jardim is a municipality in the state of Tocantins in the Northern region of Brazil.

== See also ==
- List of municipalities in Tocantins
