= Lagoa da Confusão =

Municipality in Tocantins, Brazil

- Municipality
- The Municipality of Lagoa da Confusão
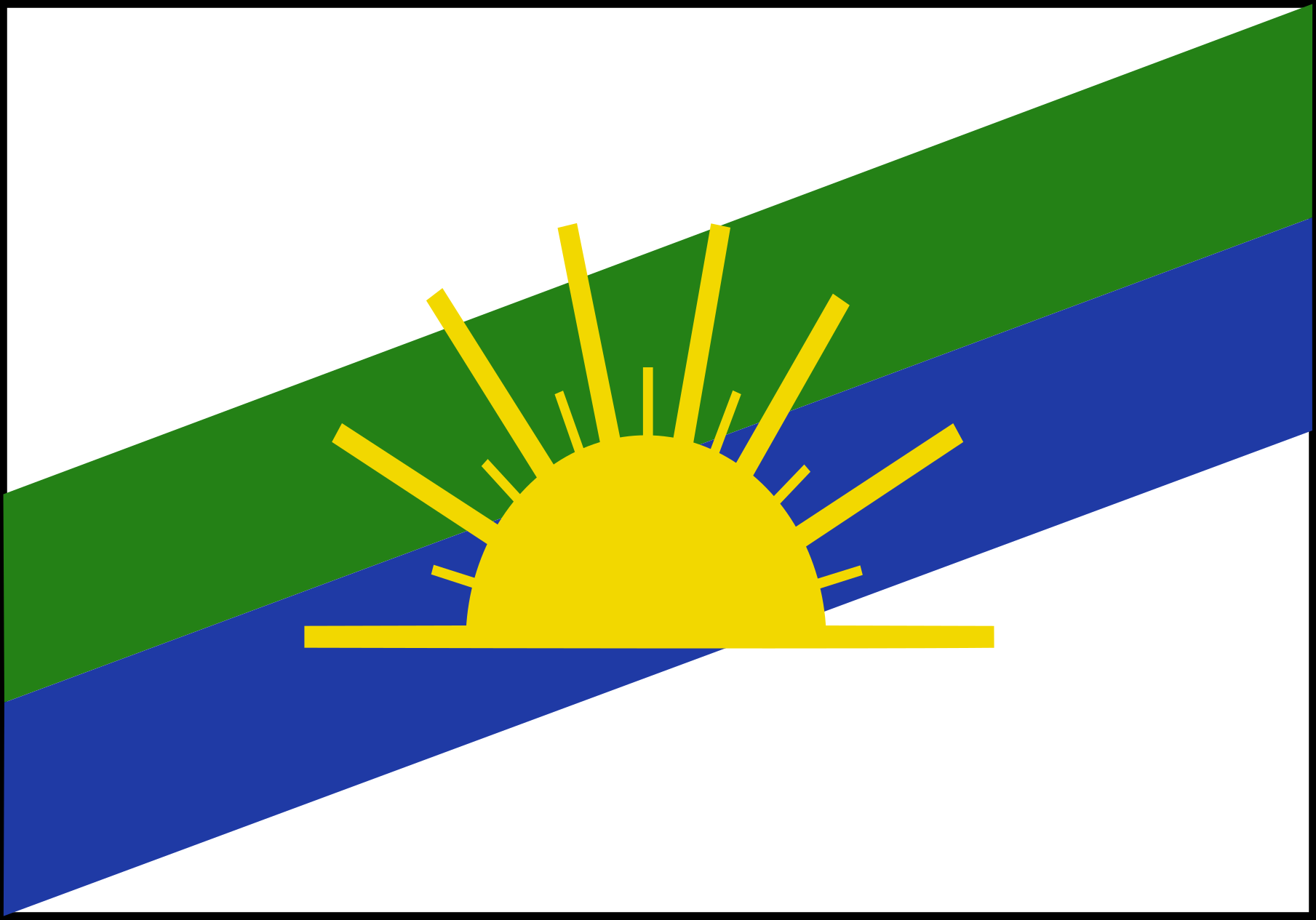
- Flag

- Location of Lagoa da Confusão in the State of Tocantins
- Coordinates: 10°47′38″S 49°37′26″W
- Country: Brazil
- Region: North
- State: Tocantins

Government
  - Mayor: Thiago Soares Carlos (DEM, 2021–2024)

Area
  - Total: 10,564.512 km^{2} (4,078.981 sq mi)
- Elevation: 200 m (660 ft)

Population (2020)
  - Total: 13,676
  - Density: 0.9/km^{2} (2.3/sq mi)
- Time zone: UTC−3 (BRT)
- HDI (2000): 0.670 – medium

Lagoa da Confusão is the westernmost city in the state of Tocantins.

== See also ==
- List of municipalities in Tocantins
