= Taguatinga, Tocantins =

Municipality in Tocantins, Brazil

Taguatinga
- Municipality
- Município de Taguatinga; Municipality of Taguatinga
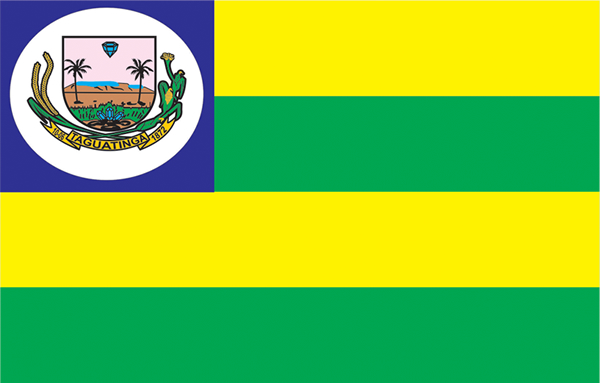
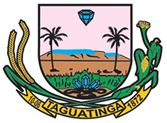
- Flag Coat of arms
- Nickname: Taguá
- Localization of Taguatinga in Tocantins

- Localization of Taguatinga in Brazil
- Coordinates: 12°24′22″S 46°26′02″W
- Country: Brazil
- Region: North Region
- State: Tocantins
- Founded: June 10, 1872

Government
  - Mayor: Altamirando Zequinha Gonçalves Taguatinga (PV) (2017-2020)

Area
  - Total: 2.437386 km^{2} (0.941080 sq mi)
- Elevation: 634 m (2,080 ft)

Population (2020)
  - Total: 16,825
  - Density: 6.18/km^{2} (16.0/sq mi)
- Demonym: Taguatinguense
- Time zone: UTC−3 (BRT)
- Postal Code (CEP): 77320-000
- Area code: +55 63
- Website: www.taguatinga.to.gov.br

Taguatinga is a municipality in the state of Tocantins in Brazil.

== Climate ==
Climate data for Taguatinga (1991–2020)
Month	Jan	Feb	Mar	Apr	May	Jun	Jul	Aug	Sep	Oct	Nov	Dec	Year
Mean daily maximum °C (°F)	31.4 (88.5)	31.2 (88.2)	31.5 (88.7)	32.0 (89.6)	32.2 (90.0)	31.8 (89.2)	31.9 (89.4)	33.3 (91.9)	35.2 (95.4)	34.7 (94.5)	32.1 (89.8)	31.6 (88.9)	32.4 (90.3)
Daily mean °C (°F)	25.3 (77.5)	25.1 (77.2)	25.3 (77.5)	25.8 (78.4)	25.7 (78.3)	24.9 (76.8)	24.8 (76.6)	26.2 (79.2)	28.0 (82.4)	28.0 (82.4)	25.9 (78.6)	25.6 (78.1)	25.9 (78.6)
Mean daily minimum °C (°F)	21.3 (70.3)	21.1 (70.0)	21.3 (70.3)	21.5 (70.7)	20.9 (69.6)	19.9 (67.8)	19.6 (67.3)	20.7 (69.3)	22.6 (72.7)	22.9 (73.2)	21.7 (71.1)	21.5 (70.7)	21.3 (70.3)
Average precipitation mm (inches)	264.1 (10.40)	215.3 (8.48)	270.4 (10.65)	160.1 (6.30)	35.3 (1.39)	1.7 (0.07)	0.3 (0.01)	1.3 (0.05)	17.2 (0.68)	115.8 (4.56)	246.0 (9.69)	237.5 (9.35)	1,565 (61.6)
Average precipitation days (≥ 1.0 mm)	16	15	17	10	3	0	0	0	2	9	15	16	103
Average relative humidity (%)	75.2	75.0	74.3	76.8	79.7	82.5	83.1	80.0	75.4	71.0	69.4	69.8	76.0
Mean monthly sunshine hours	160.3	150.9	164.6	210.7	249.4	261.4	275.9	270.2	221.0	173.9	152.8	145.3	2,436.4
Source: Instituto Nacional de Meteorologia (sun 1981–2010)

== See also ==
- List of municipalities in Tocantins
