= Jardim do Mulato =

Coordinates: 6.09889°S 42.63°W

- Municipality
- Country: Brazil
- Region: Nordeste
- State: Piauí
- Mesoregion: Centro-Norte Piauiense

Area
  - Total: 200 sq mi (510 km^{2})

Population (2020)
  - Total: 4,513
- Time zone: UTC−3 (BRT)

Jardim do Mulato is a municipality in the state of Piauí in the Northeast region of Brazil.

== See also ==
- List of municipalities in Piauí
