= Tabocão =

Municipality in Tocantins, Brazil

Coordinates: 9°01′S 48°26′W

- Municipality
- Interactive map of Tabocão
- Country: Brazil
- Region: Northern
- State: Tocantins
- Mesoregion: Ocidental do Tocantins
- Time zone: UTC−3 (BRT)

Tabocão is a municipality in the state of Tocantins in the Northern region of Brazil.

It was known as Fortaleza do Tabocão until 2019, when a plebiscite approved the change of the name and consequently, the state's governor made a law approving the name change of the municipality.

== See also ==
- List of municipalities in Tocantins
