= Wanderlândia =

Municipality in Tocantins, Brazil

Coordinates: 6°50′S 47°48′W

- Municipality
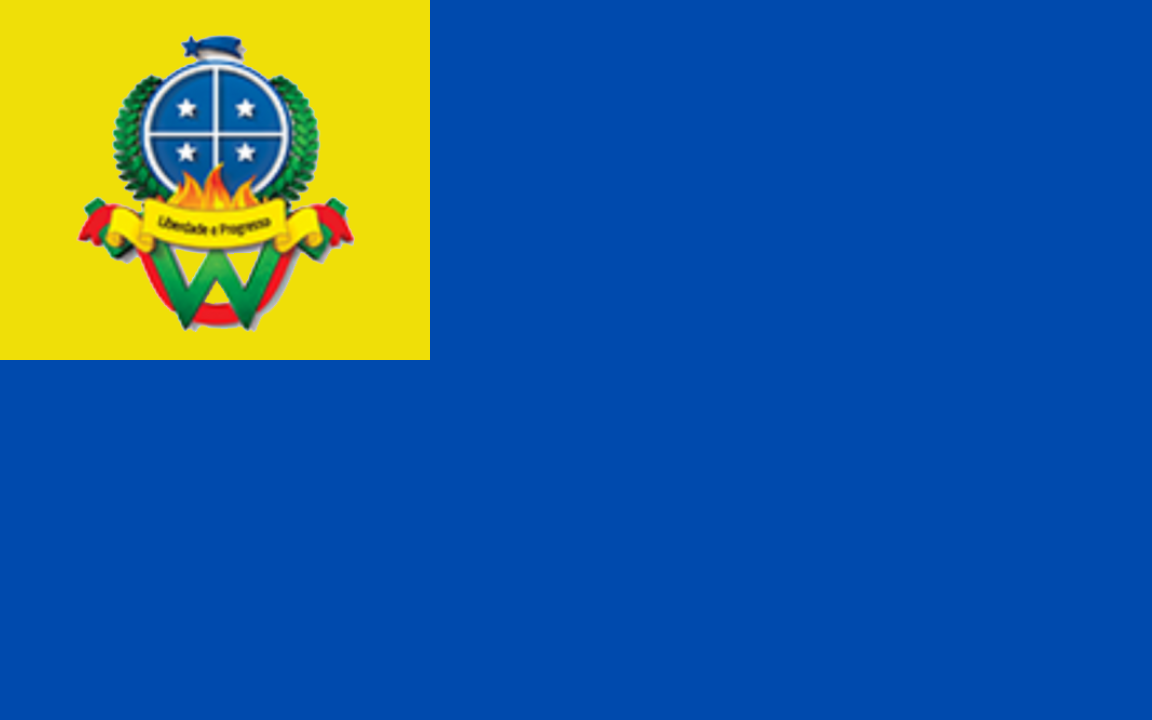
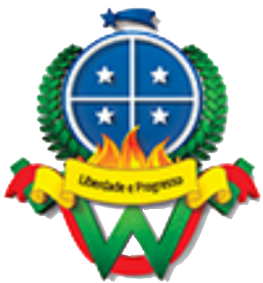
- Flag Coat of arms

- Location in Brazil
- Country: Brazil
- Region: Northern
- State: Tocantins
- Mesoregion: Ocidental do Tocantins

Population (2020)
  - Total: 11,734
- Time zone: UTC−3 (BRT)

Wanderlândia is a municipality in the state of Tocantins in the Northern region of Brazil.

== See also ==
- List of municipalities in Tocantins
