= Ipueiras, Tocantins =

Municipality in Tocantins, Brazil

Ipueiras
- Municipality
- Location in Brazil
- Coordinates: 11°14′20″S 48°27′46″W
- Country: Brazil
- Region: North
- State: Tocantins
- Mesoregion: Oriental do Tocantins

Population (2020)
  - Total: 2,052
- Time zone: UTC−3 (BRT)

Ipueiras is a municipality in the state of Tocantins in the Southern Region of Brazil.

== See also ==
- List of municipalities in Tocantins
