= Babaçulândia =

Municipality in Tocantins, Brazil

- Municipality
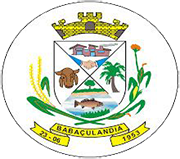
- Coat of arms

- Location in Tocantins state

- Location in Brazil
- Coordinates: 7°12′18″S 47°45′25″W
- Country: Brazil
- Region: North
- State: Tocantins

Area
  - Total: 1,788 km^{2} (690 sq mi)

Population (2020)
  - Total: 10,666
  - Density: 5.965/km^{2} (15.45/sq mi)
- Time zone: UTC−3 (BRT)

Babaçulândia is a municipality in the state of Tocantins, Brazil.

Babaçulândia was founded on 1 January 1954. It has an area of 1,788.461 square kilometres (690.529 sq mi). The most recent population figure as of 2020 was 10,666 people. The municipality includes the buffer zone of the Tocantins Fossil Trees Natural Monument.

== See also ==
- List of municipalities in Tocantins
