= Bandeirantes do Tocantins =

Municipality in Tocantins, Brazil

- Municipality
- Location in Tocantins state

- Location in Brazil
- Coordinates: 7°45′21″S 48°35′2″W
- Country: Brazil
- Region: North
- State: Tocantins

Area
  - Total: 1,542 km^{2} (595 sq mi)

Population (2020)
  - Total: 3,592
  - Density: 2.329/km^{2} (6.033/sq mi)
- Time zone: UTC−3 (BRT)

Bandeirantes do Tocantins is a municipality located in the Brazilian state of Tocantins. Its population was 3,592 (2020), and its area is 1,542 km^{2} (595 sq mi).

== See also ==
- List of municipalities in Tocantins
