= Aparecida do Rio Negro =

Municipality in Tocantins, Brazil

- Municipality
- Location in Tocantins state

- Location in Brazil
- Coordinates: 9°57′7″S 47°58′19″W
- Country: Brazil
- Region: North
- State: Tocantins

Area
  - Total: 1,160 km^{2} (450 sq mi)

Population (2020)
  - Total: 4,848
  - Density: 4.18/km^{2} (10.8/sq mi)
- Time zone: UTC−3 (BRT)

Aparecida do Rio Negro is a municipality located in the Brazilian state of Tocantins. Its population was 4,848 (2020) and its area is 1,160 km^{2}.

== See also ==
- List of municipalities in Tocantins
