= Palmeirante =

Municipality in Tocantins, Brazil

Coordinates: 7°48′S 47°48′W

- Municipality
- Interactive map of Palmeirante
- Country: Brazil
- Region: Northern
- State: Tocantins
- Mesoregion: Ocidental do Tocantins

Population (2020)
  - Total: 6,131
- Time zone: UTC−3 (BRT)

Palmeirante is a municipality in the state of Tocantins in the Northern region of Brazil.

== See also ==
- List of municipalities in Tocantins
