= List of municipalities in Tocantins =

This is a list of the municipalities in the state of Tocantins (TO), located in the North Region of Brazil. Tocantins is divided into 139 municipalities in an area of 277,620 km^{2} (107,190 sq mi), which are grouped into 8 microregions, which are grouped into 2 mesoregions.

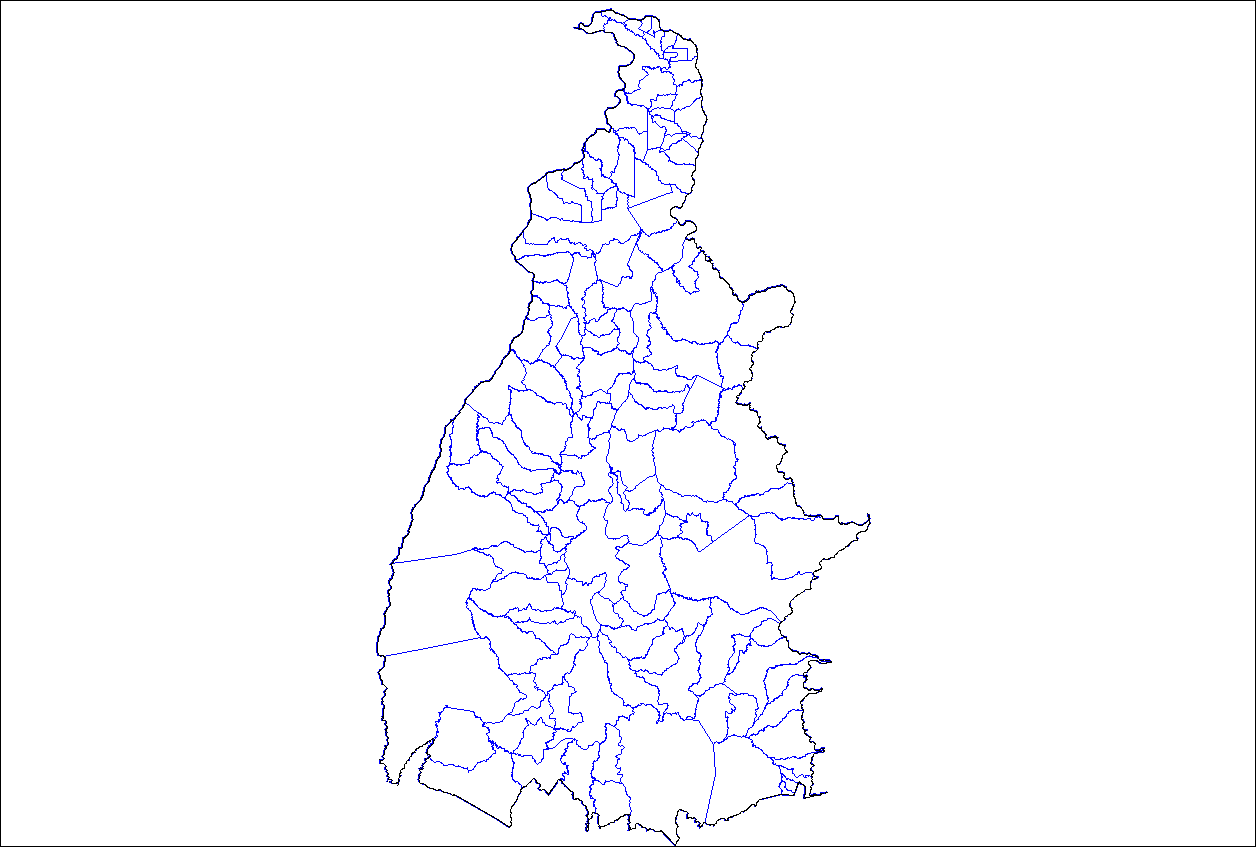
Municipalities of Tocantins, Brazil

Mesoregion	Microregion	Municipality
Ocidental do Tocantins	Araguaína	Aragominas
Ocidental do Tocantins	Araguaína	Araguaína
Ocidental do Tocantins	Araguaína	Araguanã
Ocidental do Tocantins	Araguaína	Arapoema
Ocidental do Tocantins	Araguaína	Babaçulândia
Ocidental do Tocantins	Araguaína	Bandeirantes do Tocantins
Ocidental do Tocantins	Araguaína	Carmolândia
Ocidental do Tocantins	Araguaína	Colinas do Tocantins
Ocidental do Tocantins	Araguaína	Filadélfia
Ocidental do Tocantins	Araguaína	Muricilândia
Ocidental do Tocantins	Araguaína	Nova Olinda
Ocidental do Tocantins	Araguaína	Palmeirante
Ocidental do Tocantins	Araguaína	Pau d'Arco
Ocidental do Tocantins	Araguaína	Piraquê
Ocidental do Tocantins	Araguaína	Santa Fé do Araguaia
Ocidental do Tocantins	Araguaína	Wanderlândia
Ocidental do Tocantins	Araguaína	Xambioá
Ocidental do Tocantins	Bico do Papagaio	Aguiarnópolis
Ocidental do Tocantins	Bico do Papagaio	Ananás
Ocidental do Tocantins	Bico do Papagaio	Angico
Ocidental do Tocantins	Bico do Papagaio	Araguatins
Ocidental do Tocantins	Bico do Papagaio	Augustinópolis
Ocidental do Tocantins	Bico do Papagaio	Axixá do Tocantins
Ocidental do Tocantins	Bico do Papagaio	Buriti do Tocantins
Ocidental do Tocantins	Bico do Papagaio	Cachoeirinha
Ocidental do Tocantins	Bico do Papagaio	Carrasco Bonito
Ocidental do Tocantins	Bico do Papagaio	Darcinópolis
Ocidental do Tocantins	Bico do Papagaio	Esperantina
Ocidental do Tocantins	Bico do Papagaio	Itaguatins
Ocidental do Tocantins	Bico do Papagaio	Luzinópolis
Ocidental do Tocantins	Bico do Papagaio	Maurilândia do Tocantins
Ocidental do Tocantins	Bico do Papagaio	Nazaré
Ocidental do Tocantins	Bico do Papagaio	Palmeiras do Tocantins
Ocidental do Tocantins	Bico do Papagaio	Praia Norte
Ocidental do Tocantins	Bico do Papagaio	Riachinho
Ocidental do Tocantins	Bico do Papagaio	Sampaio
Ocidental do Tocantins	Bico do Papagaio	Santa Terezinha do Tocantins
Ocidental do Tocantins	Bico do Papagaio	São Bento do Tocantins
Ocidental do Tocantins	Bico do Papagaio	São Miguel do Tocantins
Ocidental do Tocantins	Bico do Papagaio	São Sebastião do Tocantins
Ocidental do Tocantins	Bico do Papagaio	Sítio Novo do Tocantins
Ocidental do Tocantins	Bico do Papagaio	Tocantinópolis
Ocidental do Tocantins	Gurupi	Aliança do Tocantins
Ocidental do Tocantins	Gurupi	Alvorada
Ocidental do Tocantins	Gurupi	Brejinho de Nazaré
Ocidental do Tocantins	Gurupi	Cariri do Tocantins
Ocidental do Tocantins	Gurupi	Crixás do Tocantins
Ocidental do Tocantins	Gurupi	Figueirópolis
Ocidental do Tocantins	Gurupi	Gurupi
Ocidental do Tocantins	Gurupi	Jaú do Tocantins
Ocidental do Tocantins	Gurupi	Peixe
Ocidental do Tocantins	Gurupi	Palmeirópolis
Ocidental do Tocantins	Gurupi	Santa Rita do Tocantins
Ocidental do Tocantins	Gurupi	São Salvador do Tocantins
Ocidental do Tocantins	Gurupi	Sucupira
Ocidental do Tocantins	Gurupi	Talismã
Ocidental do Tocantins	Miracema do Tocantins	Abreulândia
Ocidental do Tocantins	Miracema do Tocantins	Araguacema
Ocidental do Tocantins	Miracema do Tocantins	Barrolândia
Ocidental do Tocantins	Miracema do Tocantins	Bernardo Sayão
Ocidental do Tocantins	Miracema do Tocantins	Brasilândia do Tocantins
Ocidental do Tocantins	Miracema do Tocantins	Caseara
Ocidental do Tocantins	Miracema do Tocantins	Colméia
Ocidental do Tocantins	Miracema do Tocantins	Couto de Magalhães
Ocidental do Tocantins	Miracema do Tocantins	Divinópolis do Tocantins
Ocidental do Tocantins	Miracema do Tocantins	Dois Irmãos do Tocantins
Ocidental do Tocantins	Miracema do Tocantins	Tabocão
Ocidental do Tocantins	Miracema do Tocantins	Goianorte
Ocidental do Tocantins	Miracema do Tocantins	Guaraí
Ocidental do Tocantins	Miracema do Tocantins	Itaporã do Tocantins
Ocidental do Tocantins	Miracema do Tocantins	Juarina
Ocidental do Tocantins	Miracema do Tocantins	Marianópolis do Tocantins
Ocidental do Tocantins	Miracema do Tocantins	Miracema do Tocantins
Ocidental do Tocantins	Miracema do Tocantins	Miranorte
Ocidental do Tocantins	Miracema do Tocantins	Monte Santo do Tocantins
Ocidental do Tocantins	Miracema do Tocantins	Pequizeiro
Ocidental do Tocantins	Miracema do Tocantins	Presidente Kennedy
Ocidental do Tocantins	Miracema do Tocantins	Rio dos Bois
Ocidental do Tocantins	Miracema do Tocantins	Tupirama
Ocidental do Tocantins	Miracema do Tocantins	Tupiratins
Ocidental do Tocantins	Rio Formoso	Araguaçu
Ocidental do Tocantins	Rio Formoso	Chapada de Areia
Ocidental do Tocantins	Rio Formoso	Cristalândia
Ocidental do Tocantins	Rio Formoso	Dueré
Ocidental do Tocantins	Rio Formoso	Fátima
Ocidental do Tocantins	Rio Formoso	Formoso do Araguaia
Ocidental do Tocantins	Rio Formoso	Lagoa da Confusão
Ocidental do Tocantins	Rio Formoso	Nova Rosalândia
Ocidental do Tocantins	Rio Formoso	Oliveira de Fátima
Ocidental do Tocantins	Rio Formoso	Paraíso do Tocantins
Ocidental do Tocantins	Rio Formoso	Pium
Ocidental do Tocantins	Rio Formoso	Pugmil
Ocidental do Tocantins	Rio Formoso	Sandolândia
Oriental do Tocantins	Dianópolis	Almas
Oriental do Tocantins	Dianópolis	Arraias
Oriental do Tocantins	Dianópolis	Aurora do Tocantins
Oriental do Tocantins	Dianópolis	Chapada da Natividade
Oriental do Tocantins	Dianópolis	Combinado
Oriental do Tocantins	Dianópolis	Conceição do Tocantins
Oriental do Tocantins	Dianópolis	Dianópolis
Oriental do Tocantins	Dianópolis	Lavandeira
Oriental do Tocantins	Dianópolis	Natividade
Oriental do Tocantins	Dianópolis	Novo Alegre
Oriental do Tocantins	Dianópolis	Novo Jardim
Oriental do Tocantins	Dianópolis	Paranã
Oriental do Tocantins	Dianópolis	Pindorama do Tocantins
Oriental do Tocantins	Dianópolis	Ponte Alta do Bom Jesus
Oriental do Tocantins	Dianópolis	Porto Alegre do Tocantins
Oriental do Tocantins	Dianópolis	Rio da Conceição
Oriental do Tocantins	Dianópolis	Santa Rosa do Tocantins
Oriental do Tocantins	Dianópolis	São Valério da Natividade
Oriental do Tocantins	Dianópolis	Taguatinga
Oriental do Tocantins	Dianópolis	Taipas do Tocantins
Oriental do Tocantins	Jalapão	Barra do Ouro
Oriental do Tocantins	Jalapão	Campos Lindos
Oriental do Tocantins	Jalapão	Centenário
Oriental do Tocantins	Jalapão	Goiatins
Oriental do Tocantins	Jalapão	Itacajá
Oriental do Tocantins	Jalapão	Itapiratins
Oriental do Tocantins	Jalapão	Lagoa do Tocantins
Oriental do Tocantins	Jalapão	Lizarda
Oriental do Tocantins	Jalapão	Recursolândia
Oriental do Tocantins	Jalapão	Rio Sono
Oriental do Tocantins	Jalapão	Mateiros
Oriental do Tocantins	Jalapão	Novo Acordo
Oriental do Tocantins	Jalapão	Ponte Alta do Tocantins
Oriental do Tocantins	Jalapão	Santa Tereza do Tocantins
Oriental do Tocantins	Jalapão	São Félix do Tocantins
Oriental do Tocantins	Porto Nacional	Aparecida do Rio Negro
Oriental do Tocantins	Porto Nacional	Bom Jesus do Tocantins
Oriental do Tocantins	Porto Nacional	Ipueiras
Oriental do Tocantins	Porto Nacional	Lajeado
Oriental do Tocantins	Porto Nacional	Monte do Carmo
Oriental do Tocantins	Porto Nacional	Palmas (State capital)
Oriental do Tocantins	Porto Nacional	Pedro Afonso
Oriental do Tocantins	Porto Nacional	Porto Nacional
Oriental do Tocantins	Porto Nacional	Santa Maria do Tocantins
Oriental do Tocantins	Porto Nacional	Silvanópolis
Oriental do Tocantins	Porto Nacional	Tocantínia

== See also ==
- Geography of Brazil
- List of cities in Brazil
