= Goiatins =

Municipality in Tocantins, Brazil

- Municipality
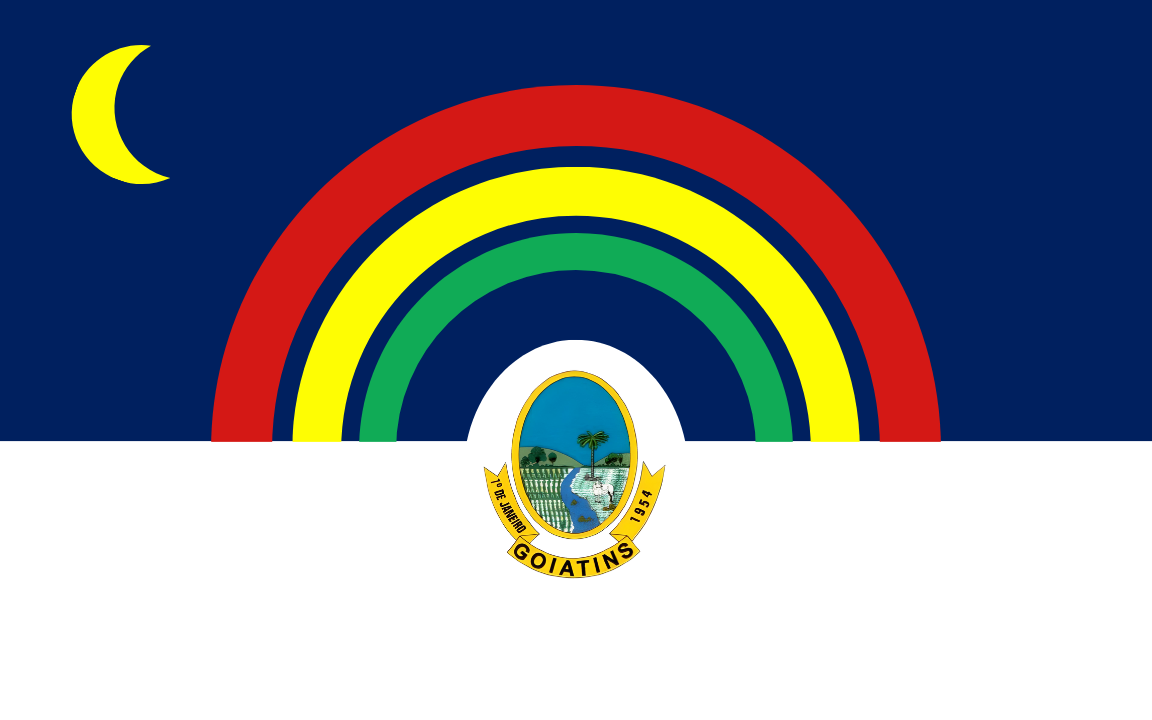
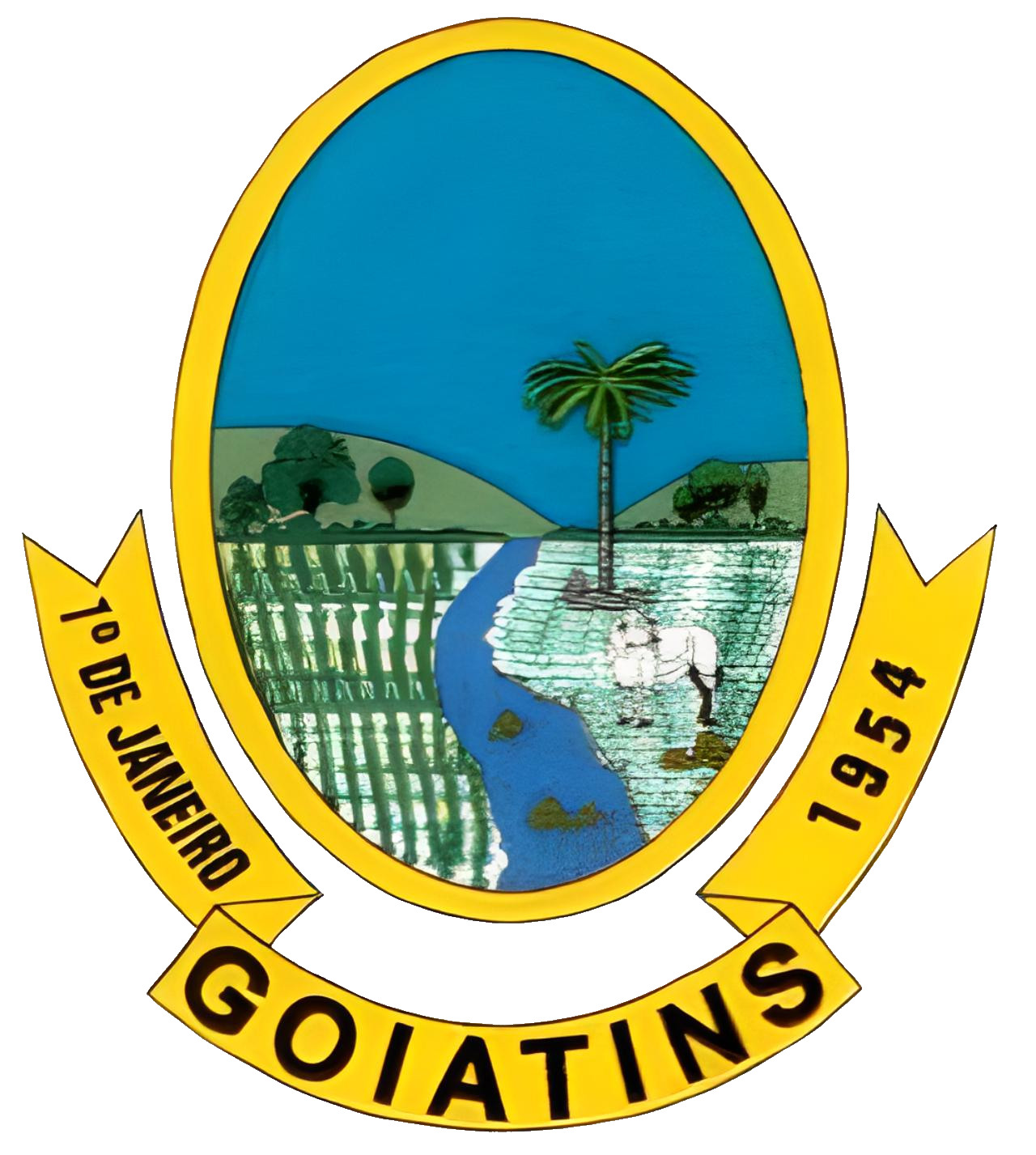
- Flag Coat of arms

- Location in Tocantins state

- Location in Brazil
- Coordinates: 7°42′43″S 47°18′52″W
- Country: Brazil
- Region: North
- State: Tocantins
- Mesoregion: Oriental do Tocantins

Population (2020)
  - Total: 13,095
- Time zone: UTC−3 (BRT)

Goiatins is a municipality in the state of Tocantins in the Northern region of Brazil.

== See also ==
- List of municipalities in Tocantins
