= Esperantina, Tocantins =

Municipality in Tocantins, Brazil

Coordinates: 5°20′34″S 48°30′39″W

Esperantina
- Municipality
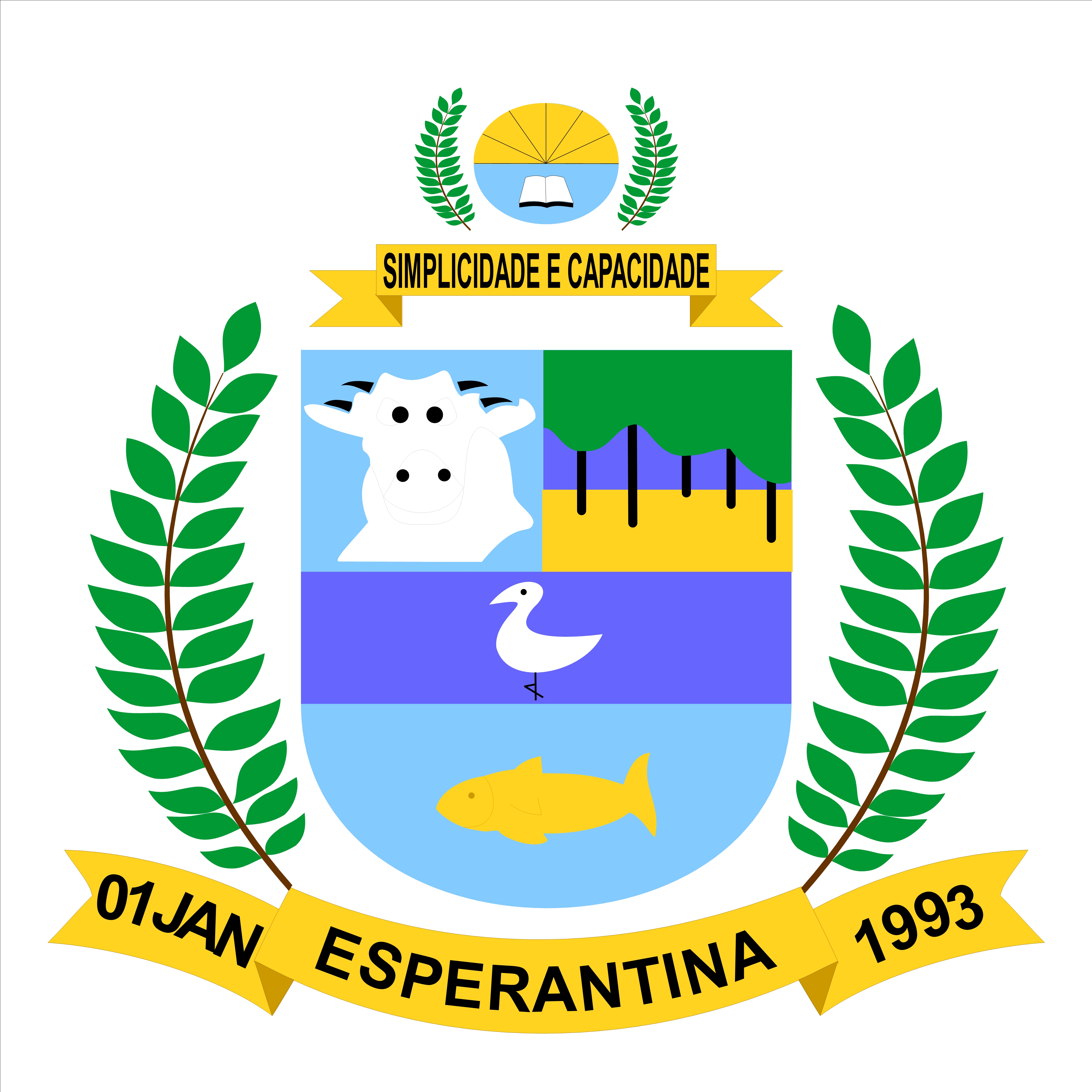
- Coat of arms
- Interactive map of Esperantina
- Country: Brazil
- Region: Northern
- State: Tocantins
- Mesoregion: Ocidental do Tocantins
- Microregion: Bico do Papagaio

Population (2020)
  - Total: 11,139
- Time zone: UTC−3 (BRT)

Esperantina is a municipality in the state of Tocantins in the Northern region of Brazil.

== See also ==
- List of municipalities in Tocantins
