= Sucupira, Tocantins =

Municipality in Tocantins, Brazil

Coordinates: 11°59′34″S 48°58′15″W

Sucupira
- Municipality
- Interactive map of Sucupira
- Country: Brazil
- Region: Northern
- State: Tocantins
- Mesoregion: Ocidental do Tocantins

Population (2020)
  - Total: 1,986
- Time zone: UTC−3 (BRT)

Sucupira is a municipality in the state of Tocantins in the Northern region of Brazil.

== See also ==
- List of municipalities in Tocantins
