= Lavandeira, Tocantins =

Municipality in Tocantins, Brazil

Coordinates: 12°47′20″S 46°30′21″W

Lavandeira
- Municipality
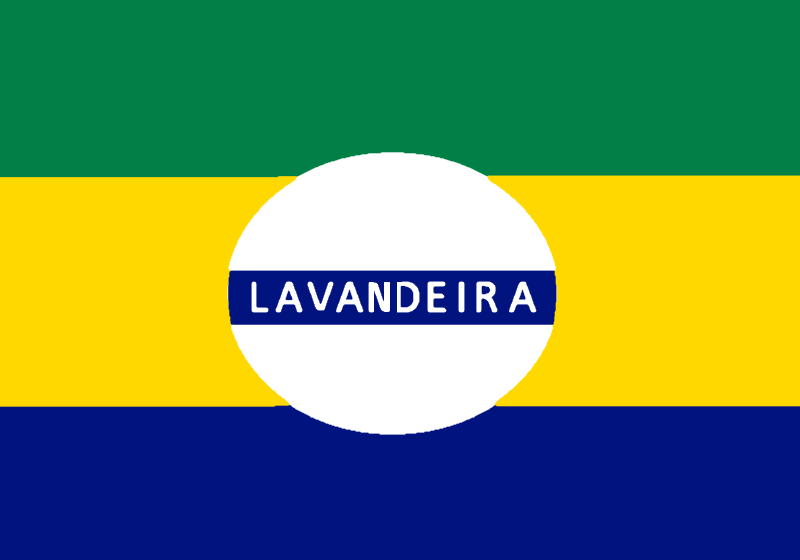
- Flag
- Interactive map of Lavandeira
- Country: Brazil
- Region: Northern
- State: Tocantins
- Mesoregion: Oriental do Tocantins

Population (2020)
  - Total: 1,954
- Time zone: UTC−3 (BRT)

Lavandeira is a municipality in the state of Tocantins in the Northern region of Brazil.

== See also ==
- List of municipalities in Tocantins
