= Xambioá, Tocantins =

Municipality in Tocantins, Brazil

Coordinates: 6°24′39″S 48°32′9″W

Xambioá
- Municipality
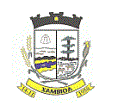
- Flag Coat of arms

- Country: Brazil
- Region: Northern
- State: Tocantins
- Mesoregion: Ocidental do Tocantins
- Microregion: Araguiana

Population (2020)
  - Total: 11,520
- Time zone: UTC−3 (BRT)

Xambioá is a municipality in the state of Tocantins in the Northern region of Brazil.

The municipality contains 43% of the 18,608-hectare (45,980-acre) Lago de Santa Isabel Environmental Protection Area, created in 2002.

== See also ==
- List of municipalities in Tocantins
