= Piraquê =

Municipality in Tocantins, Brazil

Coordinates: 6°45′S 48°10′W

- Municipality
- Interactive map of Piraquê
- Country: Brazil
- Region: Northern
- State: Tocantins
- Mesoregion: Ocidental do Tocantins

Population (2020)
  - Total: 3,033
- Time zone: UTC−3 (BRT)

Piraquê is a municipality in the state of Tocantins in the Northern region of Brazil.

== See also ==
- List of municipalities in Tocantins
