= Santa Fé do Araguaia =

Municipality in Tocantins, Brazil

Coordinates: 7°07′S 48°34′W

- Municipality
- Flag Coat of arms
- Interactive map of Santa Fé do Araguaia
- Country: Brazil
- Region: Northern
- State: Tocantins
- Mesoregion: Ocidental do Tocantins

Population (2020)
  - Total: 7,595
- Time zone: UTC−3 (BRT)

Santa Fé do Araguaia is a municipality in the state of Tocantins in the Northern region of Brazil.

== See also ==
- List of municipalities in Tocantins
