= Aragominas =

Municipality in Tocantins, Brazil

- Municipality
- Location in Tocantins state

- Location in Brazil
- Coordinates: 7°9′43″S 48°31′40″W
- Country: Brazil
- Region: North
- State: Tocantins

Area
  - Total: 1,173 km^{2} (453 sq mi)

Population (2020)
  - Total: 5,731
  - Density: 4.886/km^{2} (12.65/sq mi)
- Time zone: UTC−3 (BRT)

Aragominas is a municipality located in the Brazilian state of Tocantins. Its population was 5,731 (2020) and its area is 1,173 km^{2}.

== See also ==
- List of municipalities in Tocantins
