= Barra do Ouro =

Municipality in Tocantins, Brazil

- Municipality
- Location in Tocantins state

- Location in Brazil
- Coordinates: 7°41′20″S 47°40′58″W
- Country: Brazil
- Region: North
- State: Tocantins

Area
  - Total: 1,106 km^{2} (427 sq mi)

Population (2020)
  - Total: 4,632
  - Density: 4.188/km^{2} (10.85/sq mi)
- Time zone: UTC−3 (BRT)

Barra do Ouro is a municipality located in the Brazilian state of Tocantins. Its population is estimated at 4,632 (2020) and its area is 1,106 km^{2}.

== See also ==
- List of municipalities in Tocantins
