= Araguanã, Tocantins =

Municipality in Tocantins, Brazil

Araguanã
- Municipality
- Location in Tocantins state

- Location in Brazil
- Coordinates: 6°34′51″S 48°38′38″W
- Country: Brazil
- Region: North
- State: Tocantins

Area
  - Total: 836 km^{2} (323 sq mi)

Population (2020)
  - Total: 5,793
  - Density: 6.93/km^{2} (17.9/sq mi)
- Time zone: UTC−3 (BRT)

Araguanã is a municipality located in the Brazilian state of Tocantins. Its population was 5,793 (2020) and its area is 836 km^{2}.

The municipality contains 1.28% of the 18,608-hectare (45,980-acre) Lago de Santa Isabel Environmental Protection Area, created in 2002.

== See also ==
- List of municipalities in Tocantins
