= Presidente Kennedy, Tocantins =

Municipality in Tocantins, Brazil

Coordinates: 8°29′S 48°23′W

- Municipality
- Country: Brazil
- Region: Northern
- State: Tocantins
- Mesoregion: Ocidental do Tocantins

Population (2020)
  - Total: 3,676
- Time zone: UTC−3 (BRT)

Presidente Kennedy, Tocantins is a municipality in the state of Tocantins in the Northern region of Brazil.

== See also ==
- List of municipalities in Tocantins
- List of memorials to John F. Kennedy
