= Campos Lindos =

Municipality in Tocantins, Brazil

- Municipality
- Location in Tocantins state

- Location in Brazil
- Coordinates: 7°59′38″S 46°52′4″W
- Country: Brazil
- Region: North
- State: Tocantins

Area
  - Total: 3,240 km^{2} (1,250 sq mi)

Population (2020)
  - Total: 10,312
  - Density: 3.18/km^{2} (8.24/sq mi)
- Time zone: UTC−3 (BRT)

Campos Lindos is a municipality located in the Brazilian state of Tocantins. Its population was 10,312 (2020) and its area is 3,240 km^{2}.

== See also ==
- List of municipalities in Tocantins
