= Arapoema =

Municipality in Tocantins, Brazil

- Municipality
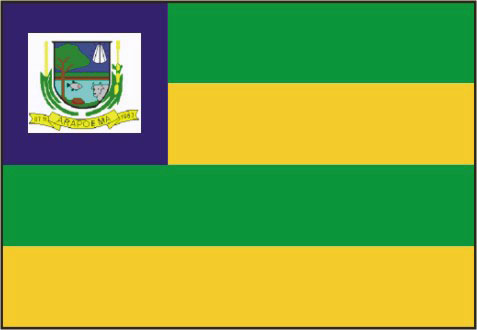
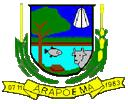
- Flag Coat of arms

- Location in Tocantins state

- Location in Brazil
- Coordinates: 7°39′28″S 49°3′50″W
- Country: Brazil
- Region: North
- State: Tocantins

Area
  - Total: 1,552 km^{2} (599 sq mi)

Population (2020)
  - Total: 6,616
  - Density: 4.263/km^{2} (11.04/sq mi)
- Time zone: UTC−3 (BRT)

Arapoema is a municipality located in the Brazilian state of Tocantins.

== Population ==
Historical population
Year	Pop.	±% p.a.
2020	6,616	—
2022	5,550	−8.41%
Source: IBGE

== See also ==
- List of municipalities in Tocantins
