= 2010 Brazilian gubernatorial elections =

- October 3, 2010 (1st round); October 31, 2010 (2nd round)
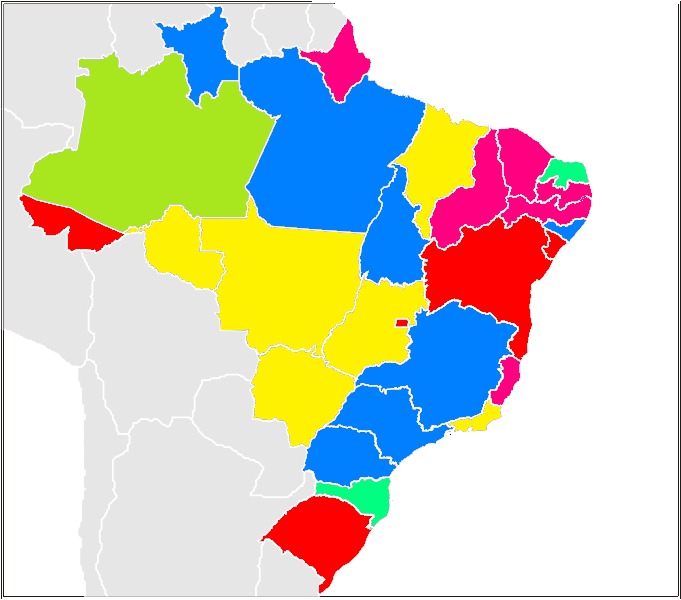
- PSDB incumbent (7) PMDB incumbent (6) PSB incumbent (6) PT incumbent (5) DEM incumbent (2) PMN incumbent (1)

The 2010 Brazilian gubernatorial elections were held on Sunday, October 3, as part of the country's general election. In these elections, all 26 Brazilian states and the Federal District governorships were up for election. When none of the candidates received more than a half of the valid votes in a given state, a run-off was held on October 24, 2010, between the two candidates with the most votes. According to the Federal Constitution, Governors are elected directly to a four-year term, with a limit of two terms. Eleven governors were prohibited from seeking re-election.

Before election, ten of the total seats were held by the Brazilian Democratic Movement Party (PMDB), followed by five held by the Workers' Party (PT) and the Brazilian Social Democracy Party (PSDB) each. The Brazilian Socialist Party (PSB) holds three seats, and the Progressive Party (PP) holds two. The Democratic Labour Party (PDT) and the Republic Party (PR) holds one seat each. Some Governors are not the same from the outcome of the previous election, since some of them had their terms repealed by the Superior Electoral Court.

These elections coincided with the presidential election, as well as the elections for Legislative Assemblies and both houses of the National Congress. These were the 8th direct gubernatorial elections, and the sixth since the end of the military dictatorship.

== Elections by state ==
Candidacies registered under the Superior Electoral Court website:

State	Incumbent	Party	Status	Candidates	Winner
Acre	Binho Marques	Workers' Party (PT)	Retired	Tião Viana (PT); Tião Bocalom (PSDB); Antônio Gouveia (PRTB)	Tião Viana (PT)
Alagoas	Teotônio Vilela Filho	Brazilian Social Democracy Party (PSDB)	Seeking re-election	Fernando Collor (PTB); Ronaldo Lessa (PDT); Tony Clóvis (PCB); Mário Agra (PSOL); Jefferson Piones (PRTB)	Teotônio Vilela Filho (PSDB)
Amapá	Waldez Góes	Democratic Labour Party (PDT)	Term-limited	Camilo Capiberibe (PSB); Genival Cruz (PSTU); Jorge Amanajas (PSDB); Luiz Cantuária (PTB); Pedro Paulo (PP)	Camilo Capiberibe (PSB)
Amazonas	Eduardo Braga	Brazilian Democratic; Movement Party (PMDB)	Term-limited	Alfredo Nascimento (PR); Hissa Abrahão (PPS); Herbert Amazonas (PSTU); Luiz Carlos Sena (PSOL); Luiz Navarro (PCB); Omar Aziz (PMN)	Omar Aziz (PMN)
Bahia	Jaques Wagner	Workers' Party (PT)	Seeking re-election	Paulo Souto (DEM); Geddel Vieira Lima (PMDB); Marcos Mendes (PSOL); Luiz Bassuma (PV); Sandro Santa Bárbara (PCB); Carlos do Nascimento (PSTU)	Jaques Wagner (PT)
Ceará	Cid Gomes	Brazilian Socialist Party (PSB)	Seeking re-election	Francisco Gonzaga (PSTU); Lúcio Alcântara (PR); Marcos Cals (PSDB); Soraya Tupinambá (PSOL); Marcelo Silva (PV); Maria "Nati" Rocha (PCB)	Cid Gomes (PSB)
Espírito Santo	Paulo Hartung	Brazilian Democratic; Movement Party (PMDB)	Term-limited	Renato Casagrande (PSB); Luiz Paulo Lucas (PSDB); Gilberto Caregnato (PRTB); Brice Bragato (PSOL); José Avelar (PCO)	Renato Casagrande (PSB)
Federal District	Rogério Rosso	Brazilian Democratic; Movement Party (PMDB)	Retired	Weslian Roriz (PSC); Agnelo Queiroz (PT); Eduardo Brandão (PV); Carlos de Andrade (PSOL); Newton Lins (PSL); Rodrigo Dantas (PSTU); Ricardo Machado (PCO)	Agnelo Queiroz (PT)
Goiás	Alcides Rodrigues	Progressive Party (PP)	Term-limited	Marconi Perillo (PSDB); Iris Rezende (PMDB); Vanderlan Cardoso (PR); Marta Jane (PCB); Washington Fraga (PSOL)	Marconi Perillo (PSDB)
Maranhão	Roseana Sarney	Brazilian Democratic; Movement Party (PMDB)	Seeking re-election	Jackson Lago (PDT); Flávio Dino (PCdoB); Marcos Igrejas (PCB); Marcos Silva (PSTU); Saulo Arcangeli (PSOL)	Roseana Sarney (PMDB)
Mato Grosso	Blairo Maggi	Republic Party (PR)	Term-limited	Silval Barbosa (PMDB); Mauro Mendes (PSB); Marcos Magno (PSOL); Wilson Santos (PSDB)	Silval Barbosa (PMDB)
Mato Grosso do Sul	André Puccinelli	Brazilian Democratic; Movement Party (PMDB)	Seeking re-election	Zeca do PT (PT); Nei Braga (PSOL)	André Puccinelli (PMDB)
Minas Gerais	Aécio Neves	Brazilian Social Democracy Party (PSDB)	Term-limited	Hélio Costa (PMDB); Antônio Anastasia (PSDB); Vanessa Portugal (PSTU); José Fernando (PV); Fábio Aparecido (PCB); Luiz Carlos Ferreira (PSOL); Edilson do Nascimento (PTdoB)	Antônio Anastasia (PSDB)
Pará	Ana Julia Carepa	Workers' Party (PT)	Seeking re-election	Simão Jatene (PSDB); Domingos Juvenil (PMDB); Cléber Rabelo (PSTU); Fernando Carneiro (PSOL)	Simão Jatene (PSDB)
Paraíba	José Maranhão	Brazilian Democratic; Movement Party (PMDB)	Seeking re-election	Ricardo Coutinho (PSB); Prancisco Oliveira (PCB); Lourdes Sarmento (PCO); Nelson Júnior (PSOL); Marcelino Rodrigues (PSTU)	Ricardo Coutinho (PSB)
Paraná	Roberto Requião	Brazilian Democratic; Movement Party (PMDB)	Term-limited	Beto Richa (PSDB); Osmar Dias (PDT); Luiz Felipe Bergmann (PSOL); Avanilson Araújo (PSTU); Amadeu Felipe (PCB); Paulo Salamuni (PV); Robinson de Paula (PRTB)	Beto Richa (PSDB)
Pernambuco	Eduardo Campos	Brazilian Socialist Party (PSB)	Seeking re-election	Jarbas Vasconcelos (PMDB); Roberto Numeriano (PCB); Anselmo Campelo (PRTB); Sérgio Xavier (PV); Edilson Silva (PSOL); Jair Pedro (PSTU)	Eduardo Campos (PSB)
Piauí	Wellington Dias	Workers' Party (PT)	Term-limited	Francisco Macedo (PMN); Geraldo Carvalho (PSTU); Romualdo Brazil (PSOL); José Avelar Costa (PSL); João Vicente Claudino (PTB); Lourdes Melo (PCO); Silvio Mendes (PSDB); Teresa Britto (PV); Wilson Martins (PSB)	Wilson Martins (PSB)
Rio de Janeiro	Sérgio Cabral Filho	Brazilian Democratic; Movement Party (PMDB)	Seeking re-election	Fernando Gabeira (PV); Eduardo Serra (PCB); Cyro Garcia (PSTU); Jefferson Moura (PSOL); Fernando Peregrino (PR)	Sérgio Cabral Filho (PMDB)
Rio Grande do Norte	Wilma de Faria	Brazilian Socialist Party (PSB)	Term-limited	Iberê Ferreira (PSB); Carlos Eduardo (PDT); Rosalba Ciarlini (DEM); Bartô Moreira (PRTB); Camarada Leto (PCB); Simone Dutra (PSTU); Sandro Pimentel (PSOL); Roberto Ronconi (PTC)	Rosalba Ciarlini (DEM)
Rio Grande do Sul	Yeda Crusius	Brazilian Social Democracy Party (PSDB)	Seeking re-election	Tarso Genro (PT); José Fogaça (PMDB); Montserrat Martins (PV); Júlio Flores (PSTU); Aroldo Medina (PRP); Pedro Ruas (PSOL); Humberto Carvalho (PCB); José Guterres (PRTB); Carlos Schneider (PMN)	Tarso Genro (PT)
Rondônia	Ivo Cassol	Progressive Party (PP)	Term-limited	Confúcio Moura (PMDB); Eduardo Valverde (PT); Expedito Júnior (PSDB); João Cahulla (PPS); Marcos Sussuarana (PSOL)	Confúcio Moura (PMDB)
Roraima	Anchieta Júnior	Brazilian Social Democracy Party (PSDB)	Seeking re-election	Neudo Campos (PP); Robert Dagon (PSOL); Ariomar Farias (PCO)	Anchieta Júnior (PSDB)
Santa Catarina	Luiz Henrique da Silveira	Brazilian Democratic; Movement Party (PMDB)	Term-limited	Ângela Amin (PP); Ideli Salvatti (PT); Raimundo Colombo (DEM); Rogério Novaes (PV); Gilmar Salgado (PSTU); Valmir Martins (PSOL); José Carmelito Smieguel (PMN); Amadeu da Luz (PCB)	Raimundo Colombo (DEM)
São Paulo	José Serra	Brazilian Social Democracy Party (PSDB)	Resigned to run for President	Geraldo Alckmin (PSDB); Aloizio Mercadante (PT); Celso Russomanno (PP); Paulo Skaf (PSB); Fábio Feldmann (PV); Paulo Bufalo (PSOL); Antonio Carlos Mazzeo (PCB); Luiz Carlos Prates (PSTU); Anaí Caproni (PCO)	Geraldo Alckmin (PSDB)
Sergipe	Marcelo Déda	Workers' Party (PT)	Seeking re-election	João Alves Filho (DEM); Vera Lúcia (PSTU); Leonardo Dias (PCB); Arivaldo José (PSDC); Henrique de Aragão (PRTB); Avilete Cruz (PSOL)	Marcelo Déda (PT)
Tocantins	Carlos Henrique Amorim	Brazilian Democratic; Movement Party (PMDB)	Seeking re-election	Siqueira Campos (PSDB)	Siqueira Campos (PSDB)

== Retired governors ==
Eleven incumbent Governors – Aécio Neves (Minas Gerais), Alcides Rodrigues (Goiás), Blairo Maggi (Mato Grosso), Eduardo Braga (Amazonas), Ivo Cassol (Rondônia), Luiz Henrique da Silveira (Santa Catarina), Paulo Hartung (Espírito Santo), Roberto Requião (Paraná), Waldez Góes (Amapá), Wilma de Faria (Rio Grande do Norte) and Wellington Dias (Piauí) – were all elected in 2002 and re-elected in 2006 and thus are not constitutionally allowed to run for their seats again.

After his involvement in a corruption scandal in late 2009 and subsequent defection from the Democrats (DEM), Federal District Governor José Roberto Arruda also became ineligible, since it is required for citizens seeking to run for any public office in the country to be a registered party member for at least one year before the predicted election date. Soon after, Arruda became the first Brazilian Governor to be arrested while still in office, on February 11, 2010. His Vice Governor, Paulo Octávio took office but resigned twelve days later. The current Governor of the Federal District is Rogério Rosso, from the Brazilian Democratic Movement Party (PMDB), indirectly elected by the local chamber after the corruption scandal. Rosso refrained from seeking a second term, as did Binho Marques, Governor of Acre.
