= 2018 Tocantins gubernatorial special election =

- 3 June 2018 (first round); 24 June 2018 (second round)
- Turnout: 69.86% (first round); 65.13% (second round)
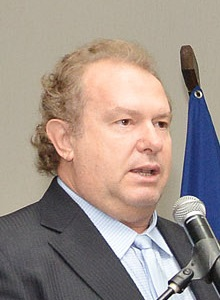

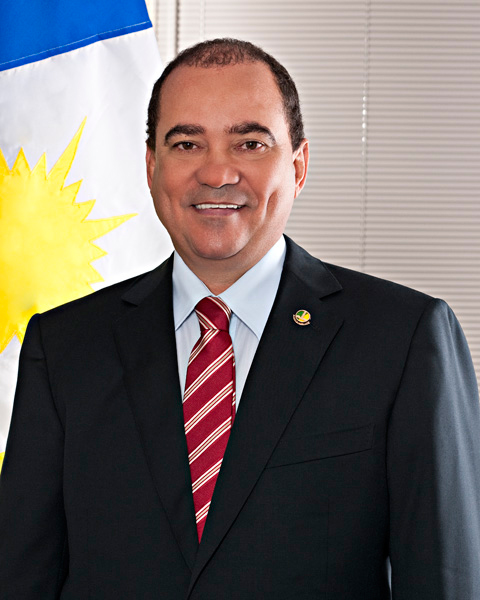
Candidate	Mauro Carlesse	Vicentinho Alves
Party	PHS	PR
Alliance	Government of Attitude	The Turn of Tocantinenses
Running mate	Wanderlei Barbosa	Divino Bethânia
popular vote	368,553	121,908
Percentage	75.14%	24.86%
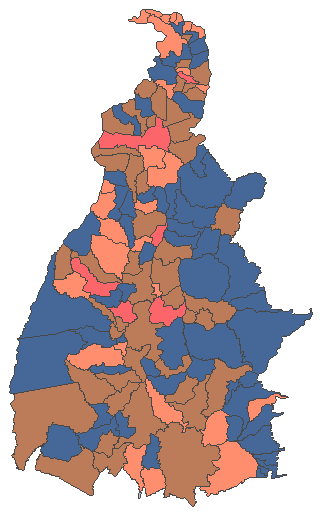
- Mauro Carlesse Vicentinho Alves Carlos Amastha Kátia Abreu
Governor before election
Mauro Carlesse
PHS
Elected Governor
Mauro Carlesse
PHS

The 2018 Tocantins gubernatorial special election was summoned by the Superior Electoral Court after the decision that removed the Governor and Vice Governor of Tocantins, who won the 2014 election, by the allegation of abuse of economic power. In the face of such sentence, the President of the Legislative Assembly, Mauro Carlesse, took office as Acting Governor until a new voting decided who would command the state government. Altogether, seven candidacies were registered for the election. Carlesse ran for Governor and defeated Senator Vicentinho Alves in the second round with more than 75% of the valid votes. The term of Carlesse ends on 1 January 2019, when the Governor-elect in the October election will take office.

== Candidates ==
=== Candidates in runoff ===
Party	Gubernatorial candidate		Vice gubernatorial candidate (Note: Same party as the presidential candidate, unless mentioned in parentheses)		Coalition
Party of the Republic (PR 22)	Vicentinho Alves	Vicentinho Alves; Senator (2011–2019); Federal Deputy (2007–2011); State Deputy (1999–2007)		Divino do Nascimento (PROS)	The Turn of Tocantinenses: Party of the Republic (PR); Republican Party of the Social Order (PROS); Solidariedade; Brazilian Woman's Party (PMB); Free Fatherland Party (PPL)
Humanist Party of Solidarity (PHS 31)	Mauro Carlesse	Mauro Carlesse; Governor of Tocantins (2018–2022); President of the Legislative Assembly of Tocantins (2017–2018); State Deputy (2015–2018)	Wanderlei Barbosa	Wanderlei Barbosa; State Deputy (2011–2018)	Government of Attitude: Humanist Party of Solidarity (PHS); Democrats (DEM); Progressive Party (PP); Brazilian Republican Party (PRB); Popular Socialist Party (PPS); Christian Labour Party (PTC); Party of National Mobilization (PMN)

=== Candidates failing to make runoff ===
Party	Gubernatorial candidate		Vice gubernatorial candidate		Coalition
Democratic Labour Party (PDT 12)	Kátia Abreu	Kátia Abreu; Senator (2007–2023); Minister of Agriculture, Livestock and Supply (2015–2016); Federal Deputy (2003–2007)	Marco Antônio Costa	Marco Antônio Costa (PSD)	Rebuilding Tocantins: Democratic Labour Party (PDT); Social Democratic Party (PSD); Social Christian Party (PSC); Avante; National Ecological Party (PEN)
Sustainability Network (REDE 18)	Márlon Reis	Márlon Reis; Judge of Law of the Court of Justice of Maranhão (1997–2016)		Edvan de Jesus Silva	—N/a
Brazilian Labour Renewal Party (PRTB 28)		Marcos Souza		Jenilson Cirqueira	—N/a
Brazilian Socialist Party (PSB 40)	Carlos Amastha	Carlos Amastha; Mayor of Palmas (2013–2018)		Célio Moura (PT)	The Real Change: Brazilian Socialist Party (PSB); Workers' Party (PT); Brazilian Labour Party (PTB); Communist Party of Brazil (PCdoB); Podemos (PODE)

=== Candidacy denied ===
Party	Gubernatorial candidate		Vice gubernatorial candidate	Coalition
Socialism and Liberty Party (PSOL 50)	Mário Lúcio Avelar	Mário Lúcio Avelar	Melk Aires	—N/a

== Debates ==
2017 Amazonas gubernatorial special election debates
No.	Date	Hosts	Moderators	Participants						
Key: P Present A Absent				PHS	PR	PSB	PDT	REDE	PRTB	PSOL
Key: P Present A Absent				Carlesse	Alves	Amastha	Abreu	Reis	Souza	Avelar
1.1	22 May 2018	TV Jovem Record	Paulo Carneiro	A	A	A	P	P	A	P
1.2	31 May 2018	TV Anhanguera Palmas, Rede Globo	Júlio Mosquera	A	P	P	P	P	P	P
2.1	21 June 2018	TV Anhanguera Palmas, Rede Globo	Fábio Castro	A	P	—N/a				

== Results ==
Candidate	Running mate	Party	First round		Second round	
Candidate	Running mate	Party	Votes	%	Votes	%
Mauro Carlesse (incumbent)	Wanderlei Barbosa	PHS	174,275	30.31	368,553	75.14
Vicentinho Alves	Divino do Nascimento (PROS)	PR	127,758	22.22	121,908	24.86
Carlos Amastha	Célio Moura (PT)	PSB	123,103	21.41		
Kátia Abreu	Marco Antônio Costa (PSD)	PDT	90,033	15.66		
Márlon Reis	Edvan de Jesus	REDE	56,952	9.91		
Marcos Souza	Jenilson Cirqueira	PRTB	2,794	0.49		
Total			574,915	100.00	490,461	100.00
Valid votes			574,915	80.81	490,461	73.94
Invalid votes			121,877	17.13	155,627	23.46
Blank votes			14,660	2.06	17,209	2.59
Total votes			711,452	100.00	663,297	100.00
Registered voters/turnout			1,018,329	69.86	1,018,329	65.14

Popular vote (first round)
Carlesse	30.31%
Alves	22.22%
Amastha	21.41%
Abreu	15.66%
Others	10.40%

Popular vote (second round)
Carlesse	75.14%
Alves	24.86%
