= Mauro Carlesse =

Brazilian politician

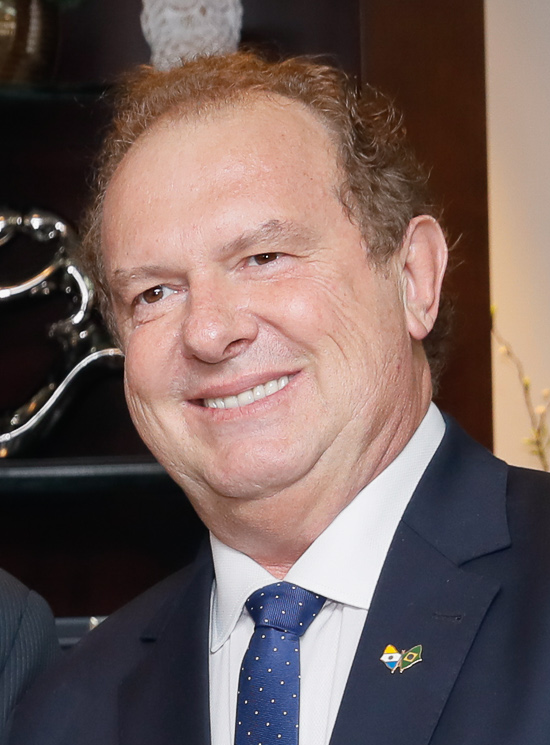
- Carlesse in May 2019

Governor of Tocantins
- In office 27 March 2018 – 11 March 2022
- Vice Governor: Wanderlei Barbosa
- Preceded by: Marcelo Miranda
- Succeeded by: Wanderlei Barbosa

President of the Legislative Assembly of Tocantins
- In office 1 February 2017 – 24 June 2018
- Preceded by: Osires Damaso
- Succeeded by: Luana Ribeiro

State Deputy of Tocantins
- In office 1 February 2015 – 24 June 2018

Personal details
- Born: 26 June 1960 (age 66) Terra Boa, Paraná, Brazil
- Party: PP (2023–present)
- Other political affiliations: PV (2011–13); PTB (2013–16); PHS (2016–19); DEM (2019–22); UNIÃO (2022); AGIR (2022-2023)

Mauro Carlesse (born 26 June 1960) is a Brazilian politician as well as a businessman. Although born in Paraná, he has spent his political career representing the state of Tocantins, having served as state governor from 2018 to 2022.

== Personal life ==
italian descent, Carlesse was born in Terra Boa in the state of Paraná, but moved to Tocantins to pursue a career in entrepreneurship. Before becoming a politician Carlesse worked as a businessman in the farming and animal husbandry industries in Tocantins. In the mid-2000s Carlesse became the president of the rural union of Gurupi.

== Political career ==
Carlesse began his political career in 2011 and joined the Green Party. The following year, he ran for mayor of Gurupi, receiving 16,713 votes or 42.78% of the total ballot, but ultimately lost the election to Laurez Moreira of the Brazilian Socialist Party.

In 2013 Carlesse changed his membership to the Brazilian Labor Party and in 2014 ran for the state legislative assembly of Tocantins. He received 12,187 votes, managing to be elected to the 8th legislature in the Tocantins Legislative Assembly.

In 2016 Carlesse joined the Humanist Party of Solidarity. On 8 July 2016 Carlesse was elected president of the Legislative Assembly for the 2017/2019 biennium. After 2018 elections the Humanist Party of Solidarity dissolved after it did not meet the membership threshold, and Carlesse joined the Democrats and took over the party's national vice presidency.

Carlesse was elected governor of Tocantins during the 2018 Brazilian gubernatorial elections, after the incumbent Marcelo Miranda did not contest the governorship.

Political offices
Preceded by Osires Damaso	President of the Legislative Assembly of Tocantins; 2017–2018	Succeeded by Luana Ribeiro
Preceded by Marcelo Miranda	Governor of Tocantins; 2018–present Acting Governor: Wanderlei Barbosa; 2021–present	Incumbent
