= 2014 Tocantins gubernatorial election =

Election for governor of the state of Tocantins, Brazil

- 5 October 2014
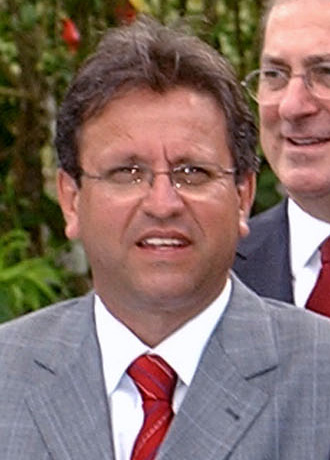

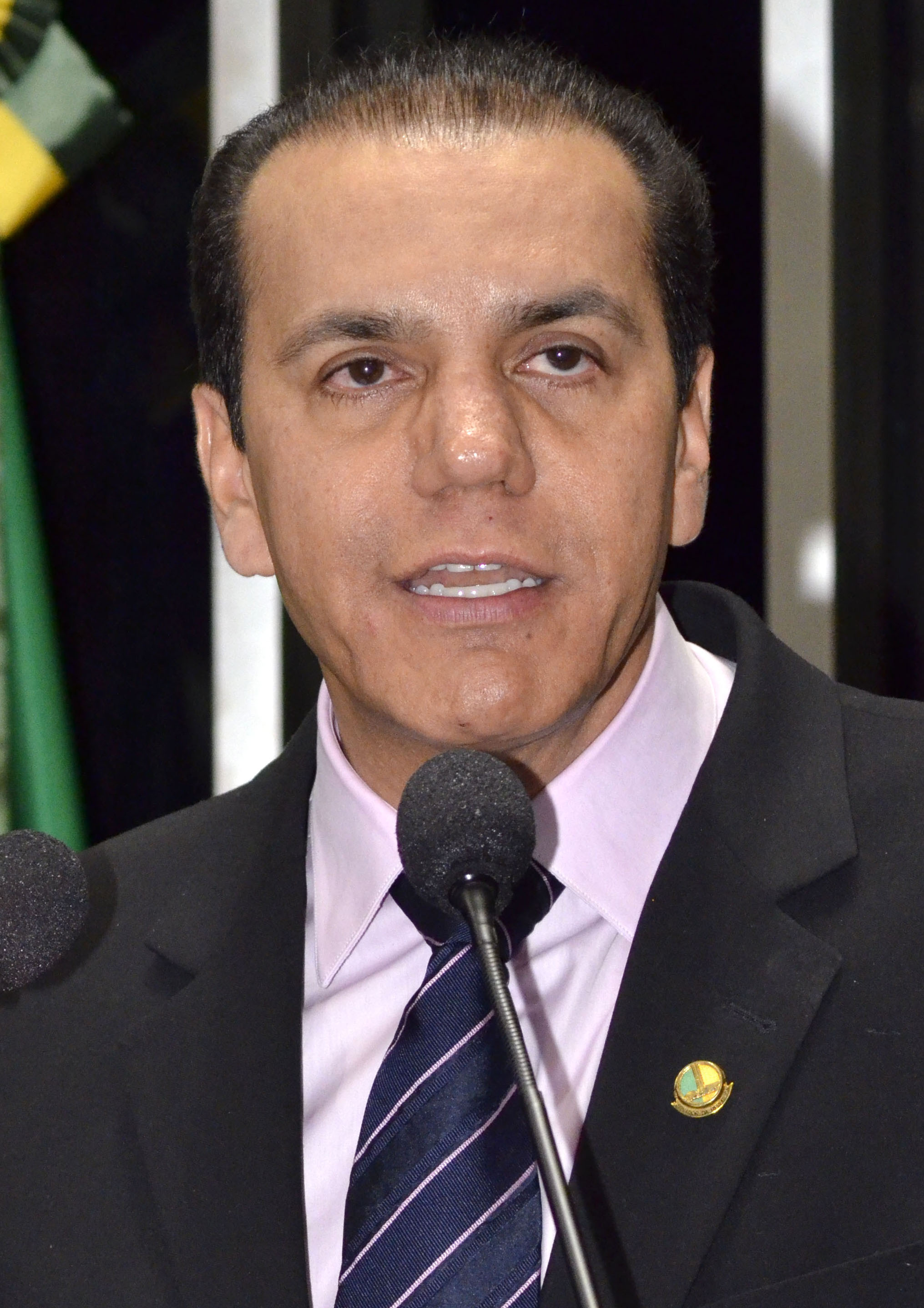
Nominee	Marcelo Miranda	Sandoval Cardoso	Ataídes Oliveira
Party	MDB	Solidarity	PROS
Running mate	Cláudia Lelis	Angelo Agnolin	Cinthia Ribeiro
Popular vote	360,640	314,392	24,874
Percentage	51.30%	44.72%	3.54%
Governor before election
Sandoval Cardoso
Solidarity
Elected Governor
Marcelo Miranda
MDB

The Tocantins gubernatorial election was held on 5 October 2014 to elect the next governor of the state of Tocantins, Brazil. If no candidate had received more than 50% of the vote, a second-round runoff election would have been held on 26 October. Governor Sandoval Cardoso ran for his first full term after becoming governor in 2014, but lost to former Governor Marcelo Miranda in the first round.

== Results ==
Tocantins gubernatorial election, 2014
Party	Candidate	Votes	%	±%
MDB	Marcelo Miranda	360,640	51.30%	
Solidarity	Sandoval Cardoso (inc.)	314,392	44.72%	
PROS	Ataídes Oliveira	24,874	3.54%	
PCB	Potengy	1,873	0.27%	
PSOL	Eula Angelim	1,234	0.18%	
Majority		46,248	6.58%	
MDB gain from Solidarity		Swing		
