= Dolores Nunes =

Brazilian lawyer and politician (1941–2023)

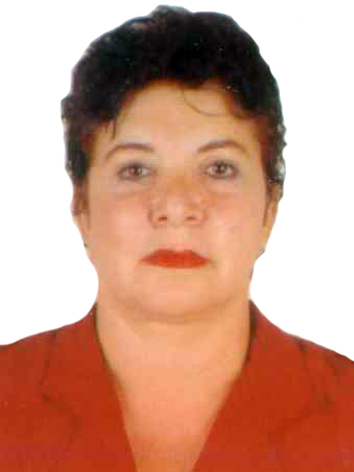
- Nunes in 2011

Member of the Chamber of Deputies of Brazil for Tocantins
- In office 1995–1999

Member of the Legislative Assembly of the State of Tocantins
- In office 1991–1995

Personal details
- Born: Maria das Dores Braga Nunes; 4 April 1941 Natividade, Tocantins, Brazil
- Died: 8 September 2023 (aged 82) Palmas, Tocantins, Brazil
- Party: PSDB; PST; PP; PPB; PFL
- Education: Faculdade Anhanguera
- Occupation: Lawyer

Maria das Dores Braga Nunes (4 April 1941 – 8 September 2023) was a Brazilian lawyer and politician.

A member of multiple political parties, she served in the Chamber of Deputies from 1995 to 1999 as a member of Progressistas. She had also been the vice-mayor of the town of Gurupi from 2013 to 2021, with Laurez da Rocha Moreira as mayor.

Nunes died of COVID-19 in Palmas, Tocantins, on 8 September 2023, at the age of 82. Her daughter is the current mayor of Gurupi, Josi Nunes.
