= 2010 Tocantins gubernatorial election =

- October 3, 2010
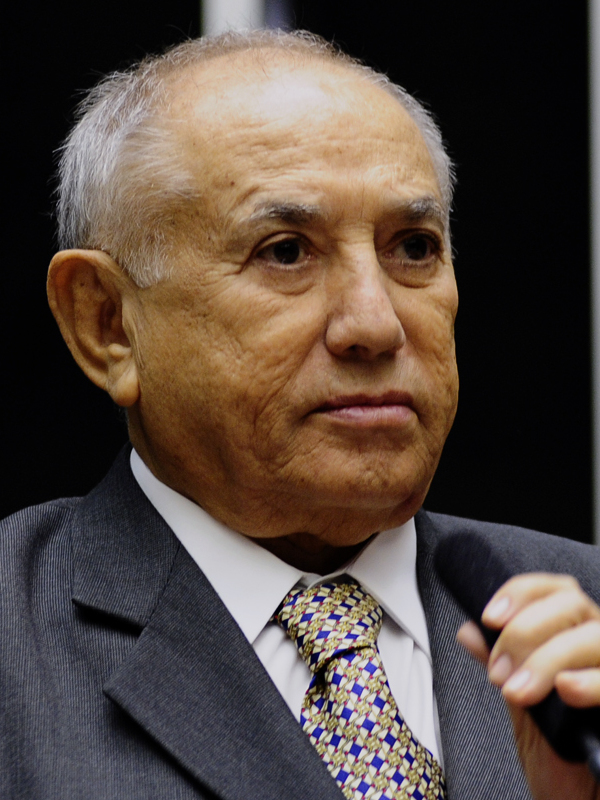

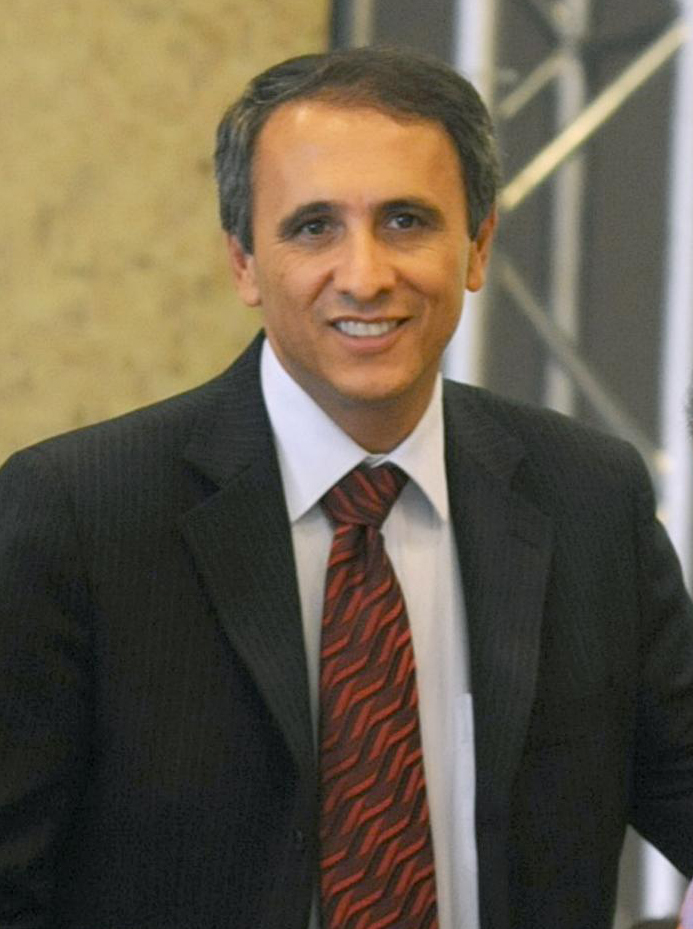
Nominee	Siqueira Campos	Carlos Gaguim
Party	PSDB	MDB
Running mate	João Oliveira	Valderez Castelo Branco
Popular vote	349,592	342,429
Percentage	50.52%	49.48%
Governor before election
Carlos Gaguim
MDB
Elected Governor
Siqueira Campos
PSDB

The Tocantins gubernatorial election was held on October 3, 2010, to elect the next governor of Tocantins. Incumbent Governor Carlos Gaguim was running for his first full term, but lost narrowly to the PSDB's Siqueira Campos.

== Candidates ==
Candidate	Running mate	Coalition
Carlos Gaguim; PMDB	Valderez Castelo Branco; PT	"Força do Povo" (PMDB, PT, PP, PDT, PSL, PPS, PSDC, PHS, PSB, PRP, PCdoB)
Siqueira Campos; PSDB	João Oliveira; DEM	"Tocantins Levado a Sério" (PSDB, DEM, PRB, PTB, PTN, PSC, PR, PRTB, PMN, PTC, PV, PTdoB)

== Election results ==
Tocantins Gubernatorial Election
Party	Candidate	Votes	%	±%
PSDB	Siqueira Campos	349,592	50.52%	
MDB	Carlos Gaguim (incumbent)	342,429	49.48%	
Majority		7,163	1.04%	
PSDB gain from MDB		Swing		
