= Sandoval Cardoso =

Brazilian politician (born 1977)

- Cardoso in 2026

Member-elect of the Chamber of Deputies
- Assuming office 1 February 2027
- Constituency: Tocantins

Governor of Tocantins
- In office 4 April 2014 – 1 January 2015; Interim: 4 April – 4 May 2014
- Vice Governor: Tom Lyra
- Preceded by: Siqueira Campos
- Succeeded by: Marcelo Miranda

Member of the Legislative Assembly of Tocantins
- In office 1 February 2007 – 4 May 2014
- Constituency: At-large

Personal details
- Born: Sandoval Lôbo Cardoso; 19 March 1977 (age 49) Goiânia, Goiás, Brazil
- Party: PODE (2026–present)
- Other political affiliations: PMDB (2006–2013); Solidariedade (2013–2026)

Sandoval Lôbo Cardoso (born 19 March 1977) is a Brazilian politician who was elected member of the Chamber of Deputies in 2026. From May to December 2014, he served as governor of Tocantins. He was a member of the Legislative Assembly of Tocantins from 2007 to 2014, and served as president of the Assembly from 2013 to 2014.

Political offices
Preceded by Siqueira Campos	Governor of Tocantins; 2014–2015	Succeeded by Marcelo Miranda
