= Siqueira Campos =

Siqueira Campos (1898–1930) was a Brazilian military officer and revolutionary.

Siqueira Campos may also refer to:

- Siqueira Campos, Paraná, a municipality in Paraná, Brazil
- Siqueira Campos (politician), Brazilian politician
