= Iratã Abreu =

Brazilian politician (born 1986)

Member-elect of the Chamber of Deputies
- Assuming office 1 February 2027
- Constituency: Tocantins

Member of the Municipal Chamber of Palmas
- In office 1 January 2013 – 1 January 2017
- Constituency: At-large

Personal details
- Born: Iratã Abreu Silvestre; 19 March 1986 (age 40) Goiânia, Goiás, Brazil
- Party: PSDB (since 2026)
- Parent: Kátia Abreu (mother)
- Relatives: Irajá Abreu (brother)

Iratã Abreu Silvestre (born 19 March 1986) is a Brazilian politician who was elected member of the Chamber of Deputies in 2026. From 2013 to 2016, he was a municipal councillor of Palmas. He is the son of Kátia Abreu and the brother of Irajá Abreu.
