= Luana Ribeiro =

Brazilian politician (born 1978)

President of the Legislative Assembly of Tocantins
- In office 28 March 2018 – 31 January 2019
- Preceded by: Mauro Carlesse
- Succeeded by: Toinho Andrade

Personal details
- Born: 19 June 1978 (age 48)
- Party: Social Democratic Party (since 2024)
- Parent: João Ribeiro (father)
- Relatives: Maria da Conceição Gayer (mother-in-law); Gustavo Gayer (brother-in-law)

Luana Matilde Ribeiro Lima (born 19 June 1978) is a Brazilian politician. She has been a member of the Legislative Assembly of Tocantins since 2024, having previously served from 2007 to 2023. In 2018, she served as president of the assembly.
