= Vicentinho Alves =

Brazilian politician (born 1957)

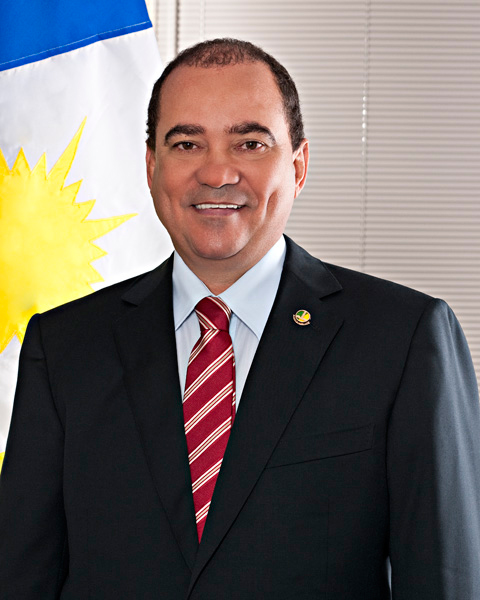

Senator for Tocantins
- In office 1 February 2011 – 1 February 2019

Member of the Chamber of Deputies
- In office 1 February 2007 – 1 February 2011
- Constituency: Tocantins

Member of the Legislative Assembly of Tocantins
- In office 1 February 1999 – 1 February 2007
- Constituency: At-large

Personal details
- Born: Vicente Alves de Oliveira; 1 October 1957 (age 69) Porto Nacional, Tocantins, Brazil
- Party: Solidariedade (since 2023)
- Other political affiliations: See list: PDT (1988–1997); PFL (1997–2005); PSDB (2005–2006); PL (2006); PR (2006–2013); SDD (2013–2014); PL (2014–2022); PP (2022–2023)
- Profession: Livestock farmer and airplane pilot

Vicente Alves de Oliveira (born 1 October 1957) is a Brazilian politician. He had represented Tocantins in the Brazilian Senate from 2011 to 2019. Previously he was a deputy from Tocantins from 2007 to 2011. He is a member of the Liberal Party (PL).
