= Laurez da Rocha Moreira =

Brazilian lawyer and politician

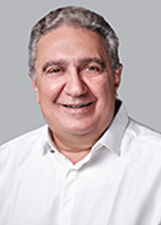

Vice Governor of Tocantins
- Incumbent
- Assumed office 1 January 2023
- Governor: Wanderlei Barbosa
- Preceded by: Wanderlei Barbosa

Mayor of Gurupi
- In office 1 January 2013 – 31 December 2020
- Preceded by: Alexandre Abdalla
- Succeeded by: Josi Nunes

Federal deputy for Tocantins
- In office 1 February 2007 – 31 December 2012

State deputy for Tocantins
- In office 1 February 1995 – 31 January 2007

Councilman for Dueré
- In office 1 January 1983 – 31 December 1987

Personal details
- Born: 3 July 1957 (age 68) Dueré, Goiás (now Tocantins), Brazil
- Party: PDT (since 2022)
- Other political affiliations: PDS (1988–1993); PPR (1993–1995); PP (1995–2005); PFL (2005–2007); PSB (2007–2017); PSDB (2017–2021); Avante (2021–2022)

Laurez da Rocha Moreira (born 3 July 1957) is a Brazilian lawyer and politician who currently has served as the vice-governor of the state of Tocantins since 2023, with Wanderlei Barbosa as governor. He is currently affiliated with the Democratic Labour Party (PDT).

Prior to assuming the position as vice-governor, he was the mayor of the town of Gurupi from 2013 to 2020. His vice-mayor was Dolores Nunes, and Rocha Moreira was succeeded by her daughter Josi Nunes. He was also both a federal deputy from and a state deputy in the state of Tocantins.
