= List of governors of Tocantins =

This is the list of governors of the Brazilian state of Tocantins.

#	Name	Took office	Left office	Party	Notes	Photo
1	José Wilson Siqueira Campos	January 1, 1989	March 15, 1991	PDC	First governor of Tocantins. First term.	
2	Moisés Nogueira Avelino	March 15, 1991	December 31, 1994	PMDB		
3	José Wilson Siqueira Campos	January 1, 1995	April 3, 1998	PPR	Second term.	
4	Raimundo Nonato Pires dos Santos	April 3, 1998	December 31, 1998	PFL	Elected as lieutenant-governor.	none available
5	José Wilson Siqueira Campos	January 1, 1999	December 31, 2002	PFL	Third term.	
6	Marcelo Miranda	January 1, 2003	December 31, 2006	Elected by PFL.	First term. Later Miranda defected to PSDB, and then to PMDB.	
6	Marcelo Miranda	January 1, 2007	September 9, 2009	Elected by PFL.	Mandate revoked by the Superior Electoral Court on June 25, 2009.	
7	Carlos Henrique Gaguim	September 9, 2009	December 31, 2010	PMDB	Elected indirectly by State Assembly.	
8	José Wilson Siqueira Campos	January 1, 2011	May 9, 2014	PSDB	Fourth term.	
9	Sandoval Cardoso	April 4, 2014 May 4, 2014	May 4, 2014 December 31, 2014	SD	Acting governor. Governor indirectly elected by the Legislative Assembly.	
10	Marcelo Miranda	January 1, 2015 April 6, 2018	March 27, 2018 April 19, 2018	PMDB	Elected governor. His mandate was revoked for the second time by the Superior Electoral Court on March 22, 2018. Return to office by preliminary decision of Justice Gilmar Mendes of the Federal Supreme Court.	
11	Mauro Carlesse	March 27, 2018 April 19, 2018 (Note: Acting Governor until July 8; Carlesse was sworn in as governor on July 9, 2018.)	April 6, 2018 December 31, 2018	PHS	President of the Legislative Assembly. Temporarily assumed the position after the removal of Gov. Marcelo Miranda. With the confirmation of the dismantling of the gov. Miranda, he takes office again until the gubernatorial special election, being elected to the position.	
11	Mauro Carlesse	January 1, 2019	March 11, 2022	PSL	Temporarily removed from office between October 20, 2021, and March 11, 2022, by order of the Superior Court of Justice. Resigned from office on March 11, 2022.	
12	Wanderlei Barbosa	March 11, 2022	December 31, 2022	Republicanos	Acting Governor between October 20, 2021, and March 11, 2022. Definitively assumed the position of Governor after the resignation of Mauro Carlesse.	
12	Wanderlei Barbosa	January 1, 2023	Present	Republicanos	Re-elected governor.	
