= Léo Barbosa =

Brazilian politician (born 1989)

Member of the Legislative Assembly of Tocantins
- Incumbent
- Assumed office 1 January 2019

Personal details
- Born: 5 May 1989 (age 37)
- Party: Republicans (since 2022)
- Parent: Wanderlei Barbosa (father)

Yhgor Leonardo Castro Leite, better known as Léo Barbosa (born 5 May 1989), is a Brazilian politician serving as a member of the Legislative Assembly of Tocantins since 2019. He is the son of Wanderlei Barbosa.
