= Wanderlei Barbosa =

Brazilian politician

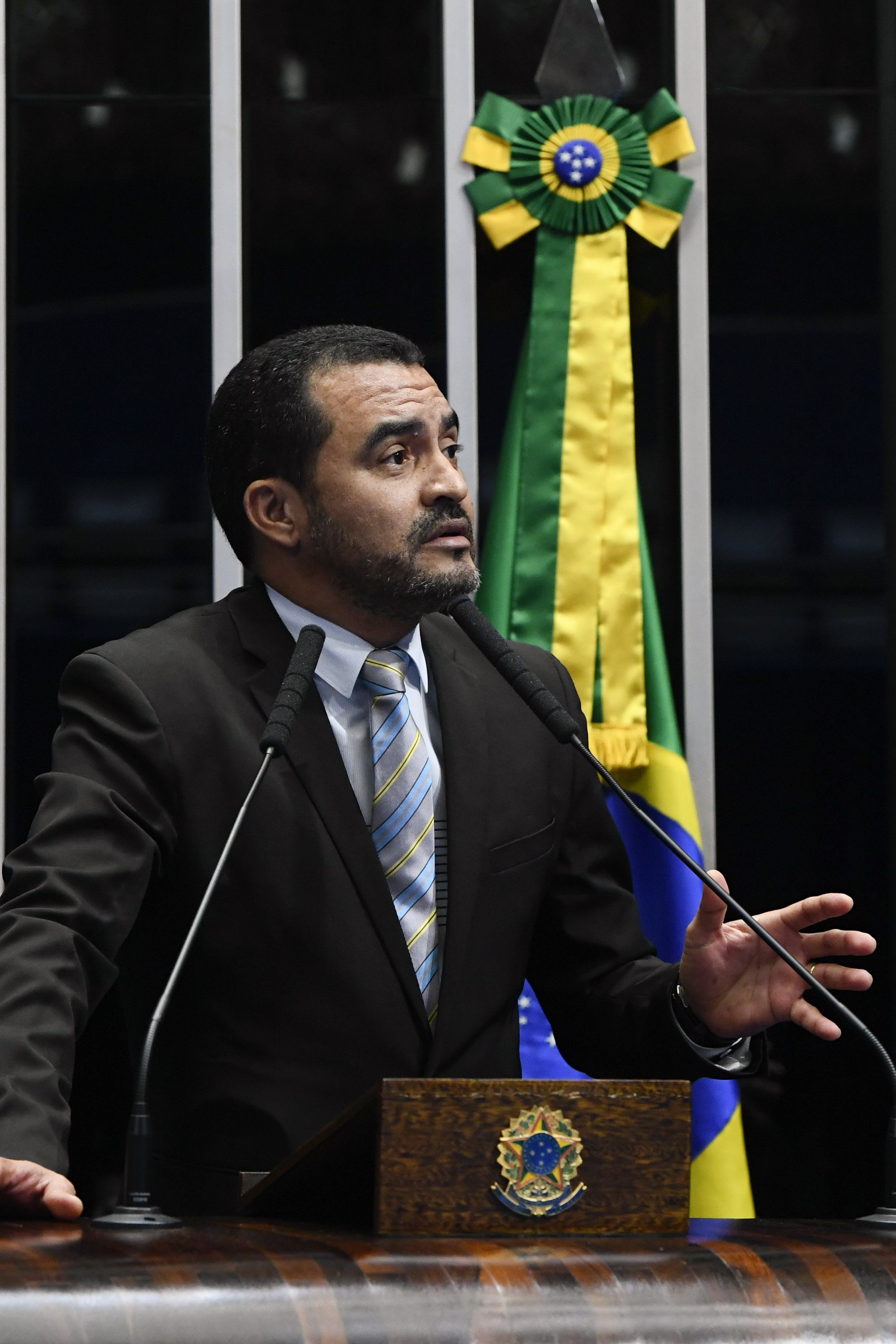

Governor of Tocantins
- Incumbent
- Assumed office 11 March 2022
- Vice Governor: None (2022); Laurez da Rocha Moreira (2023–present)
- Preceded by: Mauro Carlesse

Vice Governor of Tocantins
- In office 9 July 2018 – 11 March 2022
- Governor: Mauro Carlesse
- Preceded by: Cláudia Lelis
- Succeeded by: Laurez da Rocha Moreira (2023)

State deputy for Tocantins
- In office 1 February 2011 – 9 July 2018

Councilman for Palmas
- In office 1 January 1997 – 1 February 2011

Councilman for Porto Nacional
- In office 1 January 1989 – 1 January 1997

Personal details
- Born: Wanderlei Barbosa Castro; 12 March 1964 (age 62) Porto Nacional, Goiás (now Tocantins), Brazil
- Party: Republicanos (since 2022)
- Other political affiliations: PFL (1986–2003); PDT (2003–2007); PSB (2007–2012); PEN (2012–2013); Solidariedade (2013–2018); PHS (2018–2019); PODE (2019–2020); REP (2022-incumbant)
- Spouse: Blandina Vieira Leite
- Children: 3, including Léo

Wanderlei Barbosa Castro (born 12 March 1964 in Porto Nacional) is a Brazilian businessman and politician who has been the governor of Tocantins since 2022, after the removal of then-governor Mauro Carlesse. Prior to being governor, he was vice-governor from 2018 to 2022 under Carlesse. He is currently a member of the Republicanos party.

== Personal life ==
Born in Porto Nacional, Barbosa is the son of rancher Fenelon Barbosa Sales, the first mayor of the state capital Palmas from the Partido da Frente Liberal, and Maria Rosa de Castro Sales, a teacher who was the first Secretary of Education of Palmas. Wanderlei is married to Blandina Vieira Leite, and his son, Léo Barbosa, is currently a state deputy for Tocantins.

== Career ==
Barbosa was first elected as a councilman for Porto Nacional in 1989. In 1996, he moved to Palmas, where he was again elected as councilman from 1997 to 2011. He was the president of the municipal assembly from 2003 to 2004, and again from 2009 to 2010. He was first elected as a state deputy in Tocantins in 2010, then reelected in 2014.

In 2018, Barbosa was elected vice-governor of Tocantins, with Carlesse as governor. In 2022, he was elected in his own right as governor with 481,496 votes, or 58.14% of the vote.

Political offices
| Preceded by Cláudia Lelis | Vice Governor of Tocantins; 2018–2022 | Vacant Title next held by Laurez Moreira |
| Preceded by Mauro Carlesse | Governor of Tocantins; 2022–present | Incumbent |
