= Siqueira Campos (politician) =

Brazilian politician (1928–2023)

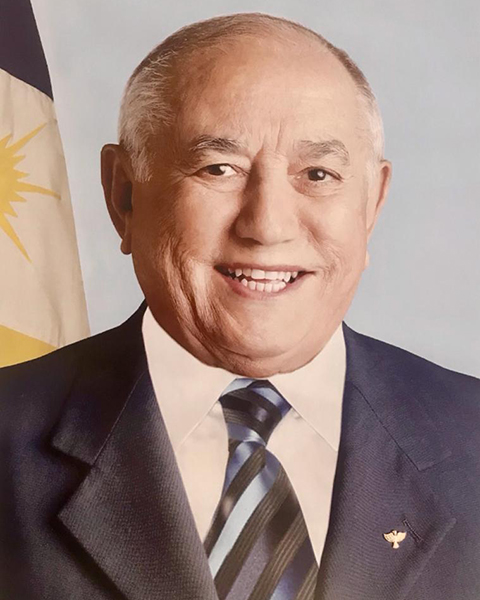
- Campos in 2019

Member of the Federal Senate of Brazil for Tocantins
- In office 16 July 2019 – 14 August 2019

Governor of Tocantins
- In office 1 January 2011 – 5 April 2014
- Preceded by: Carlos Gaguim
- Succeeded by: Sandoval Cardoso
- In office 1 January 1999 – 1 January 2003
- Preceded by: Raimundo Boi
- Succeeded by: Marcelo Miranda
- In office 1 January 1995 – 4 April 1998
- Preceded by: Moisés Avelino
- Succeeded by: Raimundo Boi
- In office 1 January 1989 – 15 March 1991
- Preceded by: position established
- Succeeded by: Moisés Avelino

Personal details
- Born: José Wilson Siqueira Campos; 1 August 1928 Crato, Ceará, Brazil
- Died: 4 July 2023 (aged 94) Palmas, Tocantins, Brazil

José Wilson Siqueira Campos (1 August 1928 – 4 July 2023) was a Brazilian politician. A member of multiple conservative political parties, he served as Governor of Tocantins on four occasions.

Campos died from an infection in Palmas, Tocantins on 4 July 2023, at the age of 94.

== Tocantins government ==
His government was marked by several works, including: Lajeado Plant, Dairy Basins, More than 200,000 jobs, More than 14 km of concrete bridges, North-South Line, Agrotins, Dona Regina Hospital, Irrigation Project Works, Prodecer Project by Pedro Afonso, Interior Hospitals, Kartódromo, Stadium, State Schools (Majority), Airport, Bus station, Palmas General Hospital, Rural Electrification, Sunflower Square, Araguaia Palace, University Buildings, Highways such as Porto-Arraia and Transpico, Junior Pioneers, Indigenous Education, Asphalt Climbing the Taquaruçu Mountains, Potable water, Tropical Medicine, Industrial Districts, 50,000 affordable homes, Taquari and Jacuba, Campos Limpos Agricultural Project, Redesat, City Hall Building, Aureny I/II/III/IV, PM general command headquarters, Cesamar Park, Tractor Distribution, Tourism in Jalapão and Cantão, Young Force, Palmas Lake Bridge, and the Construction of Palmas.
