= Ataídes Oliveira =

Brazilian politician

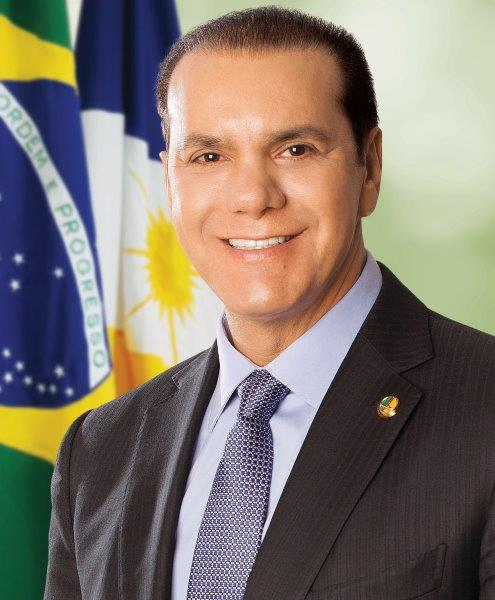

Senator from Tocantins
- Incumbent
- Assumed office December 23, 2013

Personal details
- Born: December 18, 1959 (age 66) Estrela do Norte, Goiás
- Party: Brazilian Social Democracy Party
- Profession: Businessman

Ataídes Oliveira (born December 18, 1959) is a Brazilian politician. He has represented Tocantins in the Federal Senate since 2013. He is a member of the Brazilian Social Democracy Party.

Ataídes Oliveira is a businessman in the fields of consortia, civil construction, and vehicle resale in Tocantins. As a member of the PSDB party, he was elected in the 2010 state elections in Tocantins as the first alternate senator for João Ribeiro. With the death of the incumbent, he definitively assumed the position of senator on December 23, 2013, with a term lasting until January 31, 2019.
