= Irajá Abreu =

Brazilian politician

- Official portrait

Senator for Tocantins
- Incumbent
- Assumed office 1 February 2019

Member of the Chamber of Deputies
- In office 1 February 2011 – 1 February 2019
- Constituency: Tocantins

Personal details
- Born: 3 February 1983 (age 43) Goiânia, Goiás, Brazil
- Party: PSD (2011–present)
- Other political affiliations: PFL (2003–07); DEM (2007–11)
- Parent: Kátia Abreu (mother)
- Relatives: Iratã Abreu (brother)
- Profession: Entrepreneur

Irajá Abreu (born 3 February 1983), more commonly known as Irajá, is a Brazilian politician and businessperson. Although born in Goiás, has spent his political career representing Tocantins, having served as state senator since 2019 and previously state deputy from 2011 to 2019.

== Personal life ==
Abreu was born to Irajá Silvestre and Kátia Abreu. Prior to becoming a politician Abreu worked as a businessman in the agricultural industry. Abreu's mother Kátia is also a politician who has served as a senator and government minister, and Abreu has publicly defended his mother against her critics.

== Political career ==
Abreu voted against the impeachment motion of then-president Dilma Rousseff. He would later vote in favor of opening a similar corruption investigation against Rousseff's successor Michel Temer, and voted in favor of the 2017 Brazilian labor reforms.

In the 2018 Brazilian general election Abreu was elected to the national senate with 214,355 votes. At the age of 35, he broke the record as the youngest ever individual elected to the national senate.
