= Kátia Abreu =

Brazilian politician

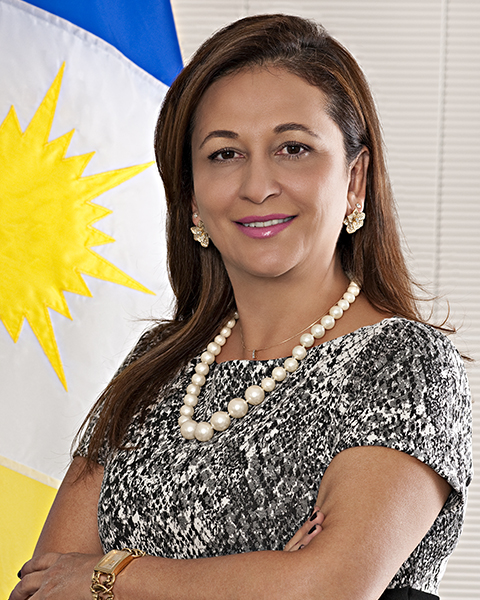
- Official portrait, 2011

Senator for Tocantins
- In office 1 February 2007 – 1 February 2023

Minister of Agriculture, Livestock and Supply
- In office 1 January 2015 – 12 May 2016
- President: Dilma Rousseff
- Preceded by: Neri Geller
- Succeeded by: Blairo Maggi

Member of the Chamber of Deputies
- In office 1 February 2003 – 1 February 2007
- Constituency: Tocantins

Personal details
- Born: 2 February 1962 (age 64) Goiânia, Goiás, Brazil
- Party: PP (2020–present)
- Other political affiliations: PPB (1995–1998); DEM (1998–2011); PSD (2011–2013); MDB (2013–2017); PDT (2018–2020)
- Spouses: Irajá Silvestre (m. 1984; died 1987) Moisés Gomes (m. 2015)
- Children: 3, including Irajá and Iratã
- Education: Pontifical Catholic University of Goiás (PsyB)
- Profession: Rancher
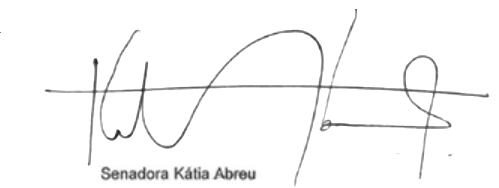
- Signature

Kátia Regina de Abreu (2 February 1962) is a Brazilian politician, serving as a Senator for Tocantins since 2007. She was previously elected as a congresswoman for Tocantins from 2003 to 2007. After her departure from the Democratic Labour Party in March 2020, Kátia joined the Progressistas.

On 23 December 2014, then President Dilma Rousseff appointed Abreu as Minister of Agriculture, to serve during the president's second term, amidst controversies involving environmentalists, including Greenpeace. Abreu took office on 1 January 2015, during Rousseff's second inauguration. Abreu was replaced by Blairo Maggi, following the impeachment of Dilma.

In November 2017, she was expelled from the Brazilian Democratic Movement Party for contributing to the opposition. In 2018, she joined the Democratic Labour Party, supporting Ciro Gomes' presidential campaign.

Political offices
Preceded by Neri Geller	Minister of Agriculture, Livestock and Supply; 2015–2016	Succeeded by Blairo Maggi
Party political offices
Preceded by Jefferson Peres	PDT nominee for Vice President of Brazil; 2018	Succeeded by Ana Paula Matos
