= Carlos Gaguim =

Brazilian politician (born 1961)

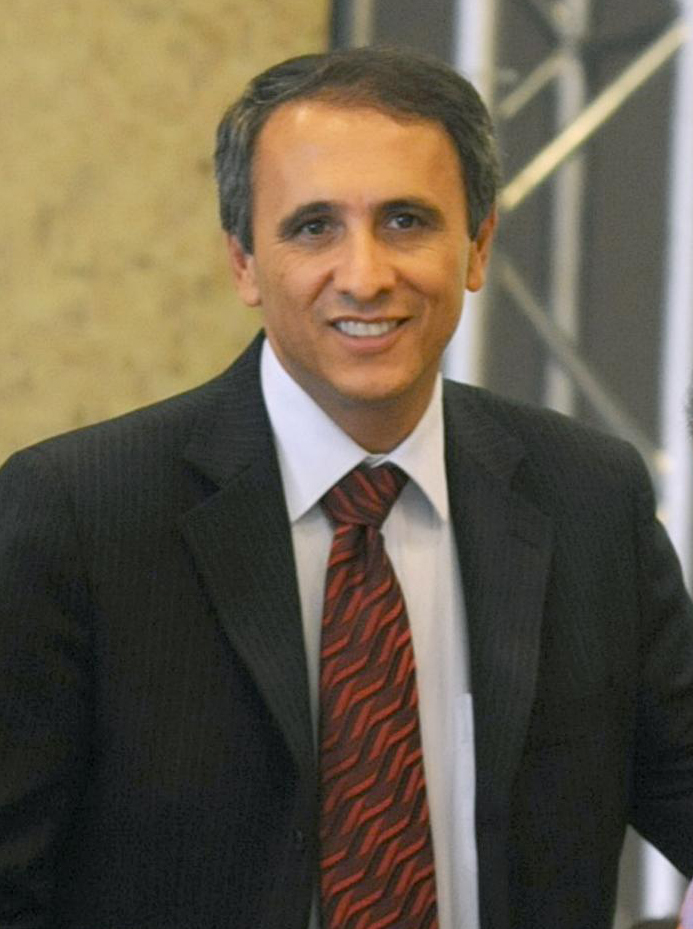
- Gaguim in 2009

Member of the Chamber of Deputies
- Incumbent
- Assumed office 1 February 2015
- Constituency: Tocantins

Governor of Tocantins
- In office 9 September 2009 – 31 December 2010
- Preceded by: Marcelo Miranda
- Succeeded by: Siqueira Campos

Personal details
- Born: 21 April 1961 (age 65)
- Party: Brazil Union (since 2022)

Carlos Henrique Amorim, better known as Gaguim (born 21 April 1961), is a Brazilian politician serving as a member of the Chamber of Deputies since 2015. From 2009 to 2010, he served as governor of Tocantins.
