= Terra Boa, Paraná =

Terra Boa
- Municipality
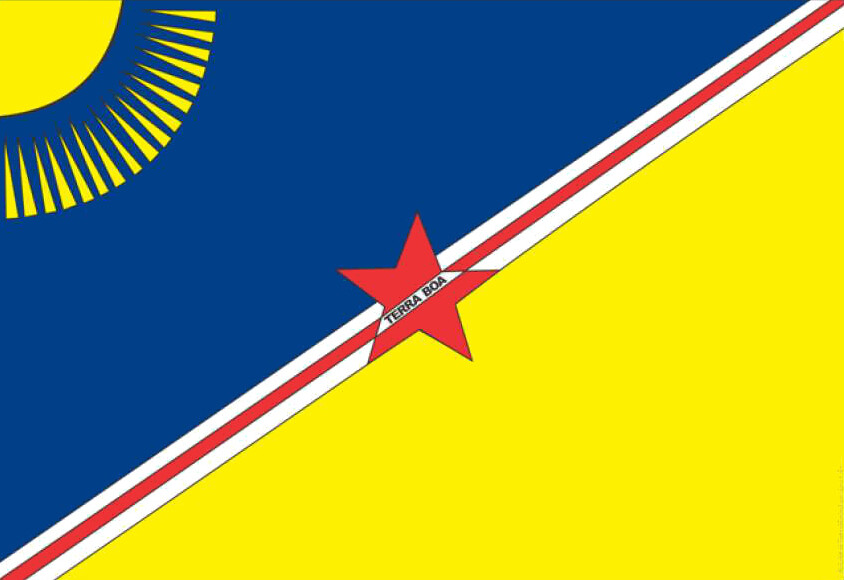
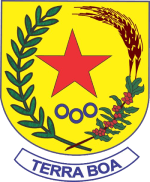
- Flag Seal

- Location in Paraná state

- Location in Brazil
- Coordinates: 23°46′04″S 52°26′38″W
- Country: Brazil
- Region: South
- State: Paraná
- Mesoregion: Centro Ocidental Paranaense
- Microregion: Campo Mourão
- Emancipated: 13 July 1955

Government
  - Mayor: Valter Peres (PSD)

Area
  - Total: 320.85 km^{2} (123.88 sq mi)
- Elevation: 825 m (2,707 ft)

Population (2020)
  - Total: 17,200
  - Density: 53.6/km^{2} (139/sq mi)
- Demonym: Terraboense
- Time zone: UTC−3 (BRT)
- Postal code: 87240-xxx
- Area code: +55 44
- HDI (2010): 0,728 - high

Terra Boa is a municipality in the micro-region of Campo Mourão in the Brazilian state of Paraná. The population is 17,200 (2020 est.) in an area of 320.85 km². The elevation is 825 m. The neighbouring municipalities are Cianorte, Engenheiro Beltrão, Jussara and Peabiru.
