= Gurupi Airport =

Brazilian Airport

Comte. Jacinto Nunes Airport Aeroporto Comte. Jacinto Nunes
- IATA: GRP; ICAO: SWGI; LID: TO0004

Summary
- Airport type: Public
- Operator: Infraero (2023–present)
- Serves: Gurupi
- Opened: 1989
- Time zone: BRT (UTC−03:00)
- Elevation AMSL: 350 m (1,150 ft)
- Coordinates: 11°44′22″S 049°08′00″W
- Website: www4.infraero.gov.br/aeroporto-gurupi/

Map
- Location in Brazil

Runways
Direction	Length		Surface
Direction	m	ft	Surface
12/30	1,730	5,676	Asphalt

Statistics (2025)
- Passengers: 16,028 ▲8%
- Aircraft Operations: 5,412 ▲2%
- Metric tonnes of cargo: 0
- Statistics: Infraero; Sources: Airport Website, ANAC, DECEA

Comte. Jacinto Nunes Airport (IATA: GRP, ICAO: SWGI) is the airport serving Gurupi, Brazil.

It is operated by contract by Infraero.

== History ==
On June 2, 2023 the Mayor of Gurupi signed a contract of operation with Infraero. Previously the airport was operated by the municipality.

== Access ==
The airport is located 7 km (4 mi) from downtown Gurupi.

== See also ==
- List of airports in Brazil
