= 2010 Paraná gubernatorial election =

2010 October Paraná election

- October 3, 2010
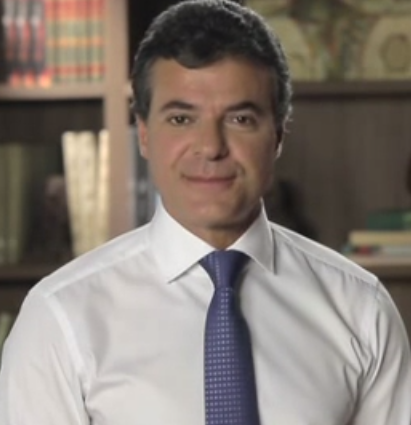

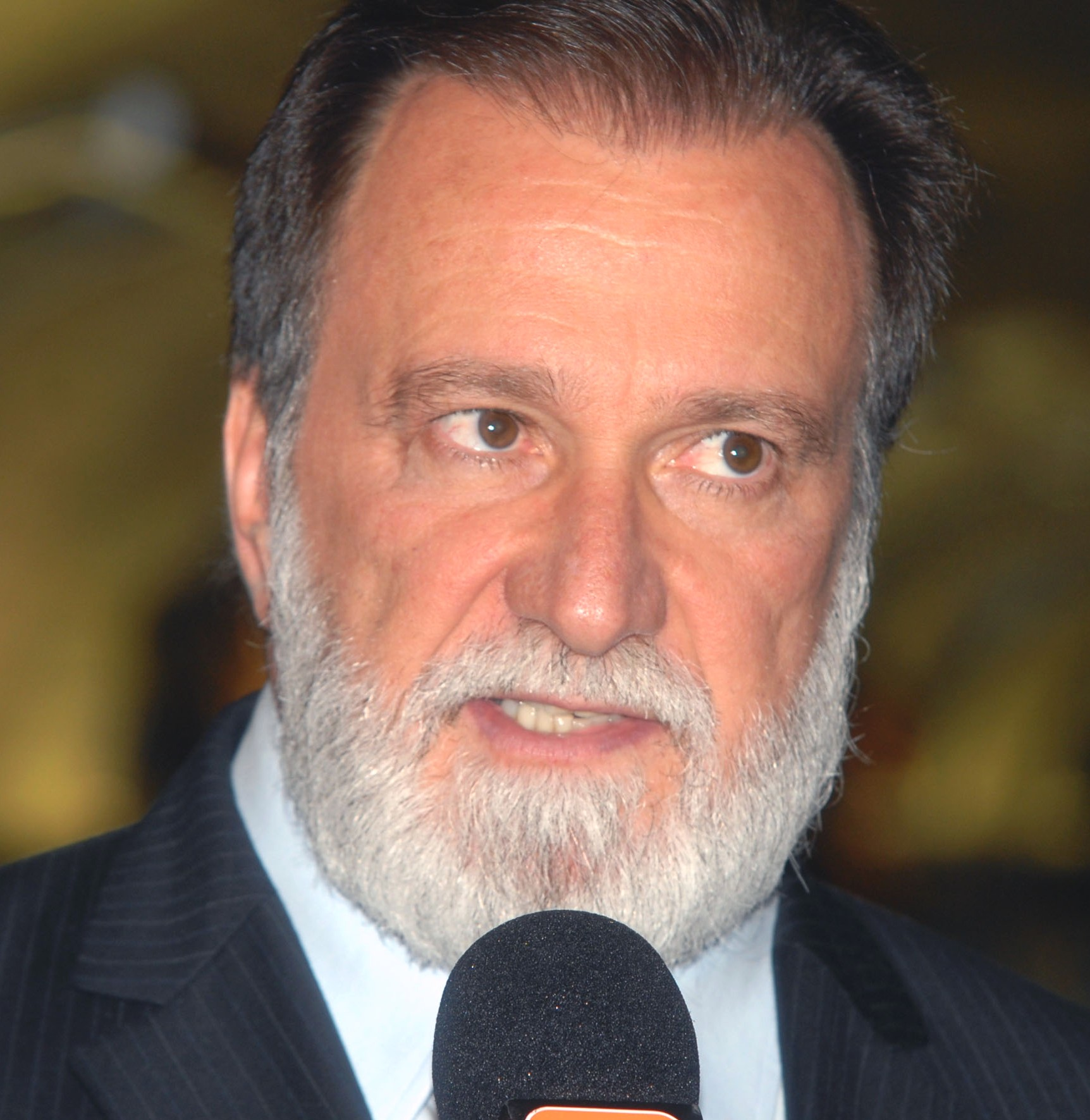
Nominee	Beto Richa	Osmar Dias
Party	PSDB	PDT
Running mate	Flávio Arns	Rodrigo Rocha Loures
Popular vote	3,039,774	2,645,341
Percentage	52.44%	45.63%
Governor before election
Orlando Pessuti
MDB
Elected Governor
Beto Richa
PSDB

The Paraná gubernatorial election was held on October 3, 2010, to elect the next governor of Paraná. The 2 people running for Governor were Beto Richa of the PSDB and Osmar Dias. Beto Richa won election for his first term as governor.
