= 2010 Mato Grosso do Sul gubernatorial election =

- October 3, 2010
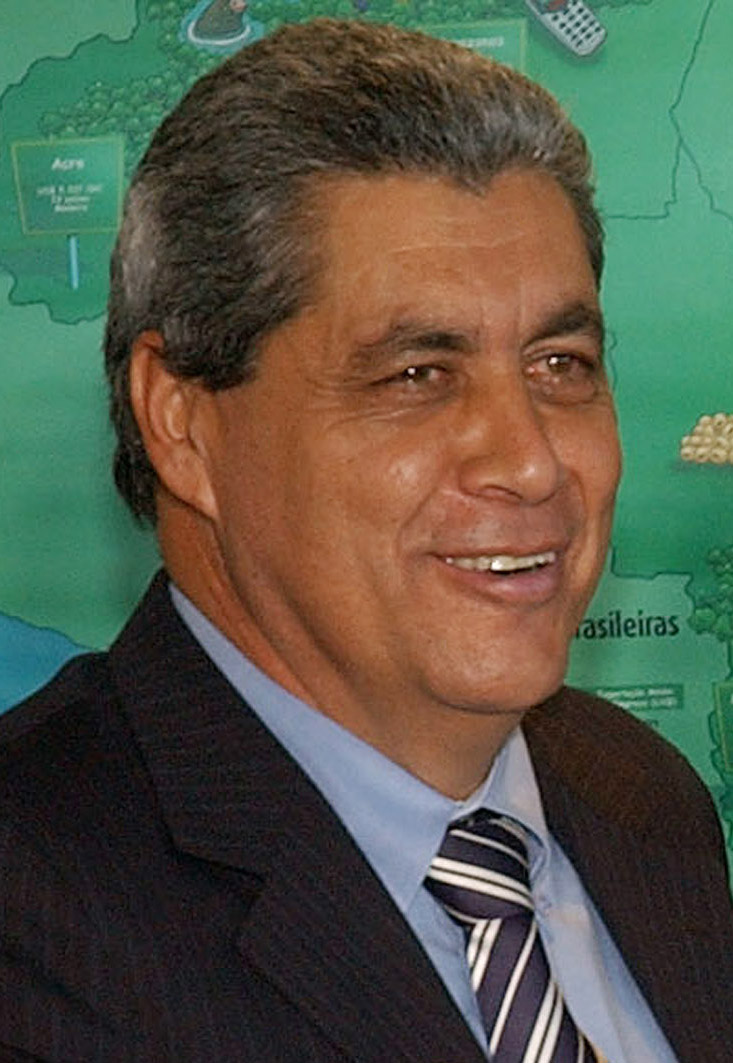

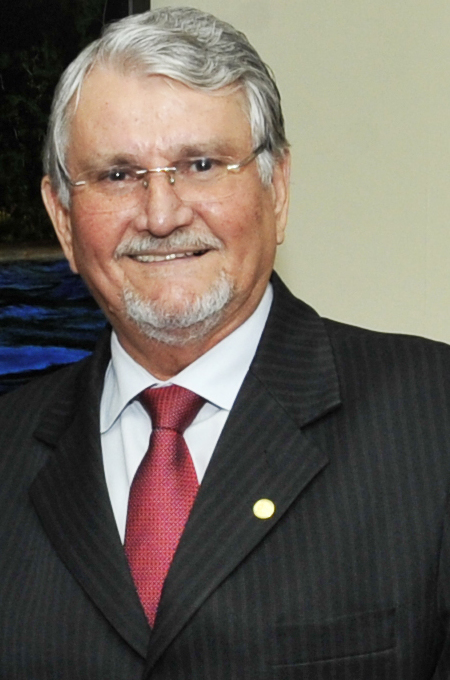
Nominee	André Puccinelli	Zeca do PT
Party	MDB	PT
Running mate	Simone Tebet	Tatiana Ujacow
Popular vote	704,407	534,601
Percentage	56%	42.5%
Governor before election
André Puccinelli
MDB
Elected Governor
André Puccinelli
MDB

The 2010 Mato Grosso do Sul gubernatorial election was held on October 3, 2010, to elect the next governor of Mato Grosso do Sul. The PMDB's incumbent Governor André Puccinelli won election to a second term.

== Candidates ==
Candidate	Running mate	Coalition
José Orcírio Miranda dos Santos (Zeca do PT); PT	Tatiana Ujacow; PV	"The People's Strength" (PT, PV, PP, PCdoB, PDT, PSL, PSC, PSDC, PRP)
André Puccinelli; PMDB	Simone Tebet; PMDB	"Love, Work and Faith" (PMDB, DEM, PSDB, PRB, PTB, PPS, PSB, PR, PTN, PRTB, PHS, PMN, PTC, PTdoB)
Nei Braga; PSOL	Ivone Teodoro; PSOL	-

== Election results ==
Mato Grosso do Sul Gubernatorial Election, 2010
Party	Candidate	Votes	%	±%
MDB	André Puccinelli	704,407	56%	
PT	Zeca do PT	534,601	42.5%	
PSOL	Nei Braga	18,943	1.51%	
Majority		169,806	13.5%	
MDB hold		Swing		
