= 2010 Santa Catarina gubernatorial election =

- October 3, 2010; First turn
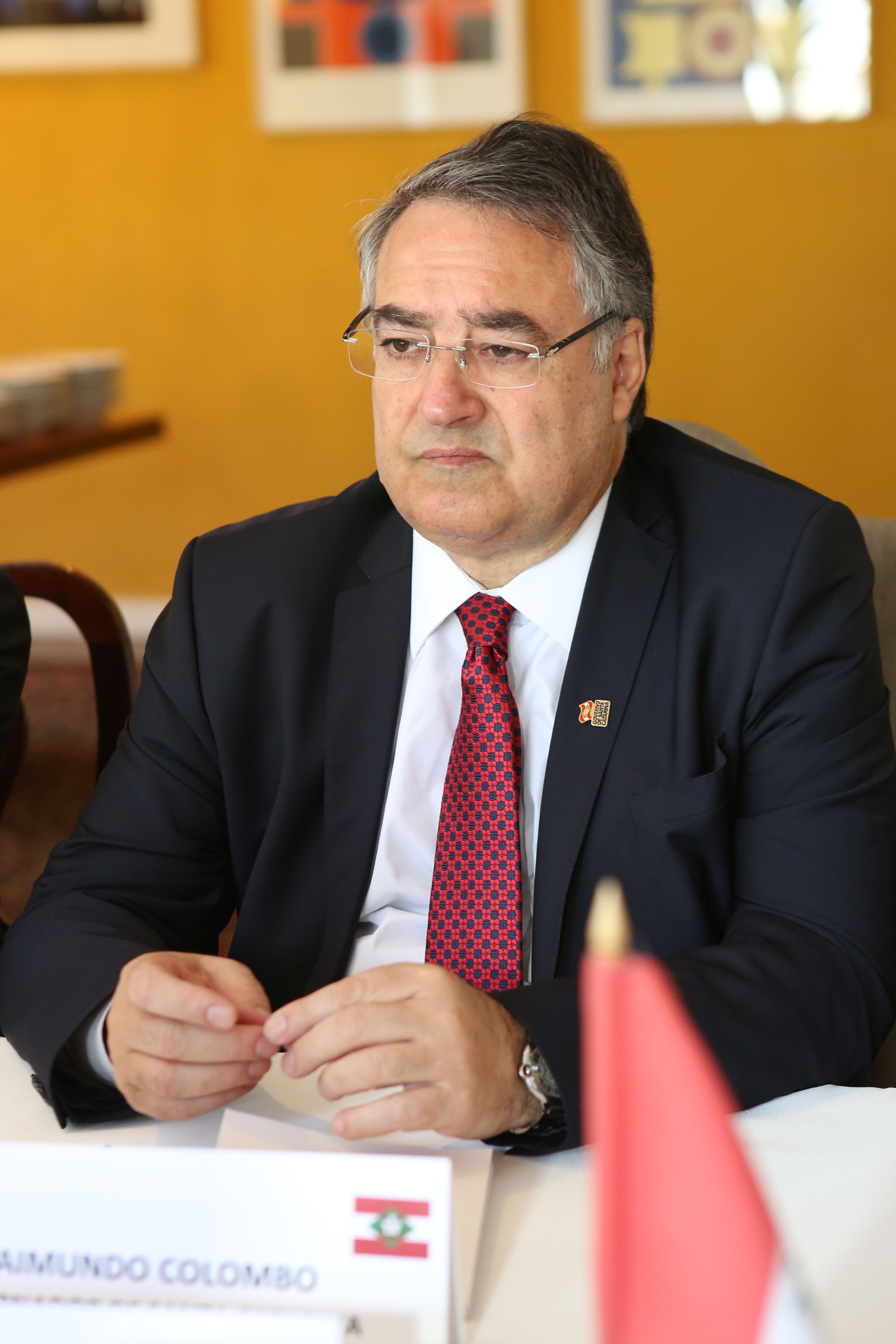

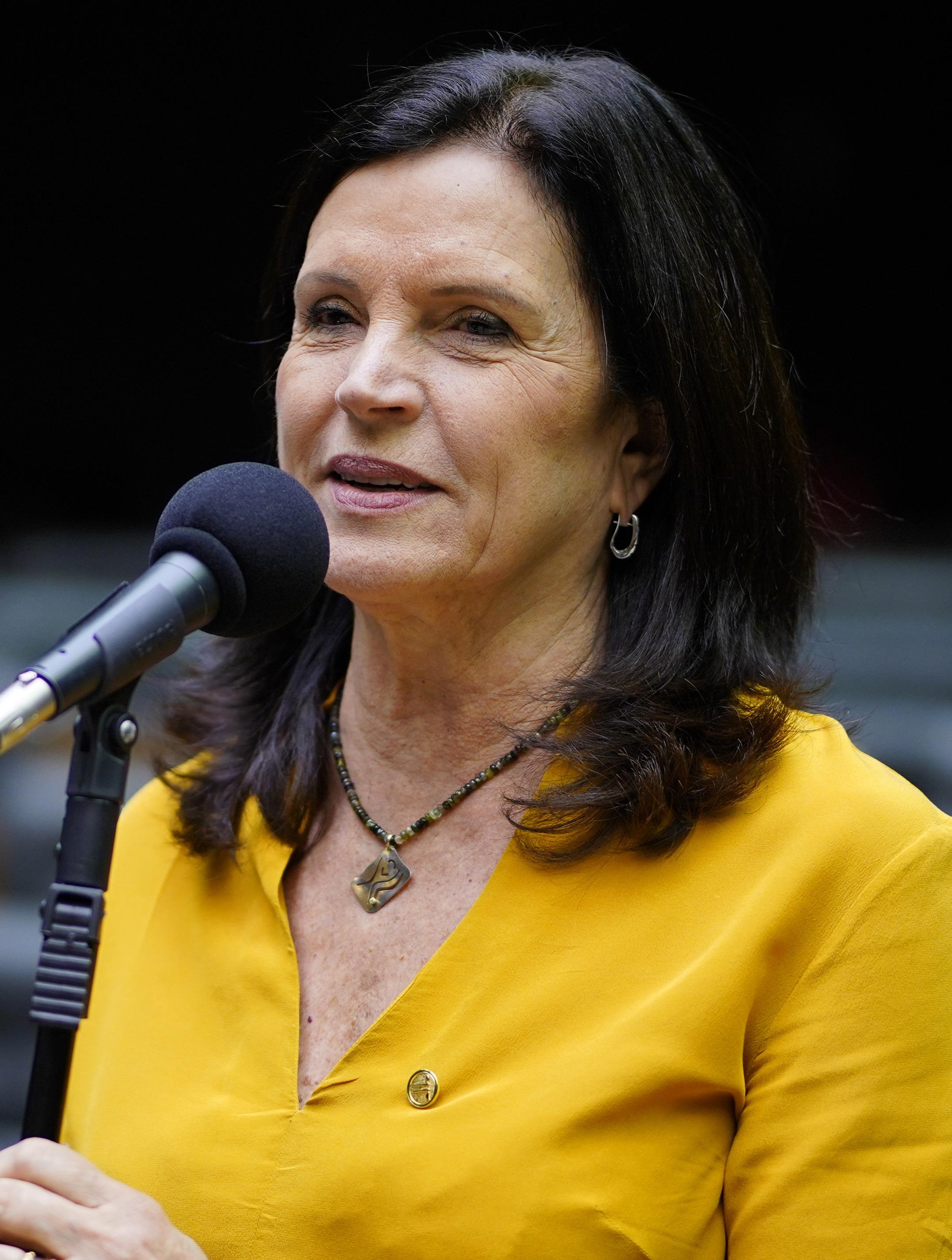

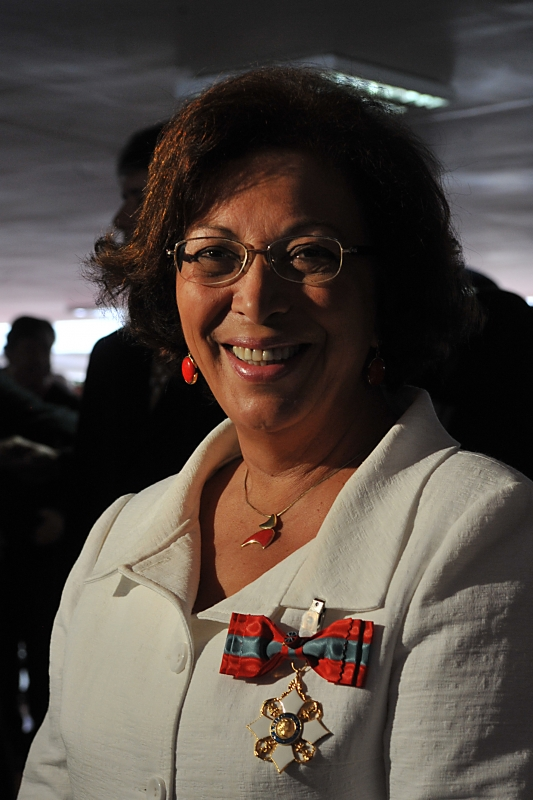
Nominee	Raimundo Colombo	Ângela Amin	Ideli Salvatti
Party	DEM	PP	PT
Running mate	Eduardo Pinho Moreira	Manoel Dias	Guido Bretzke
Popular vote	1.815.304	857.698	754.223
Percentage	52,72%	24,91%	21,9%
Governor before election
Luiz Henrique da Silveira
MDB
Elected Governor
Raimundo Colombo
DEM

The 2010 Santa Catarina gubernatorial election was held on October 3, as part of the general elections in Brazil. Raimundo Colombo of the Democrats was elected as governor. One of the losing candidates, Ideli Salvatti, was chosen by president Dilma Rousseff to assume the Ministry of Fishing and Aquaculture.

== Opinion polling ==
Date	Institute	Candidate								None / Undecided
Date	Institute	Amadeu (PCB)	Angela Amin (PP)	Carmelito (PMN)	Gilmar Salgado (PSTU)	Ideli Salvatti (PT)	Professor Valmir (PSOL)	Raimundo Colombo (DEM)	Rogério Noaves (PV)	None / Undecided
August 3–5, 2010	Ibope	1%	38%	1%	1%	15%	1%	23%	—	12% / 7%
August 24–26, 2010	Ibope	1%	31%	—	—	16%	1%	27%	1%	18% / 5%
September 21–23, 2010	Ibope	—	27%	—	—	16%	—	43%	—	7% / 5%
