= 2010 Roraima gubernatorial election =

State election in Brazil

- October 31, 2010
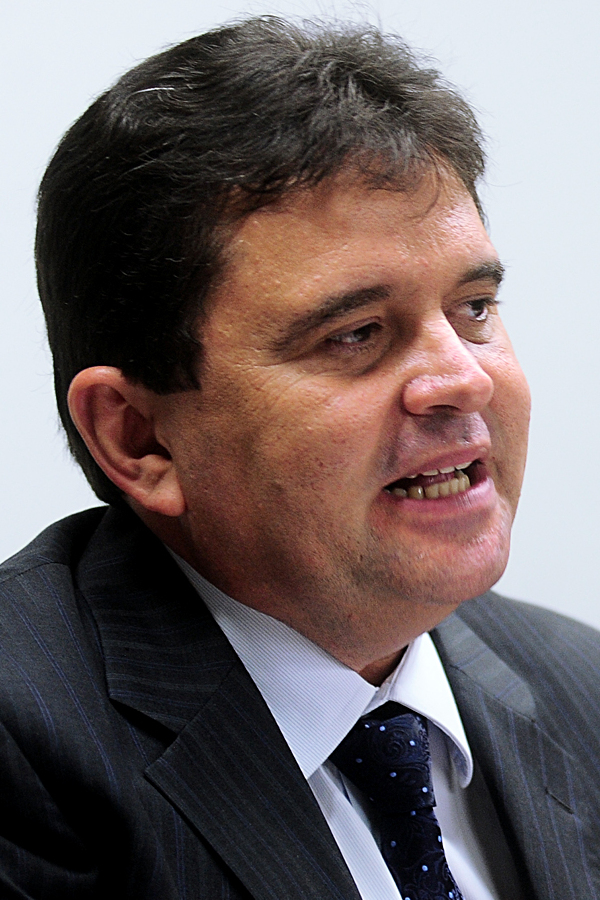

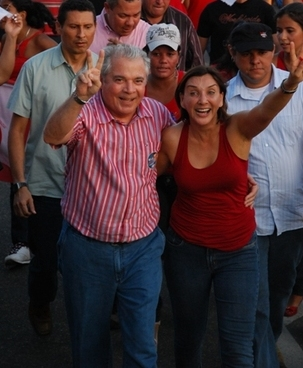
Nominee	Anchieta	Neudo Campos
Party	PSDB	PP
Running mate	Chico Rodrigues	Marília Pinto
Popular vote	107,466	105,707
Percentage	50.41%	49.59%
Governor before election
Anchieta
PSDB
Elected Governor
Anchieta
PSDB

The state elections Roraima in 2010 happened on October 3 as part of general elections that year in Brazil. At this time, elections were held in all 26 Brazilian states and the Federal District. Citizens eligible to vote elected the president, the governor and two senators per state, plus state and federal deputies. Since no presidential candidate, and governor of Rondônia received more middle of the valid votes, a runoff is carried out in the 31 October at the presidential election second round was between Rousseff's (PT) and José Serra (PSDB), with victory Dilma; already in the government of Rondonia was among Neudo Campos and Anchieta in Anchieta victory. Under the Federal Constitution, the President and the governors are directly elected for a term of four years, with a limit of two terms, so the president Luiz Inácio Lula da Silva was unable to stand, since he was elected in 2002 and reelected in 2006. Already Anchieta, elected in 2006, tried a re-election and won it.
