= 2010 Pernambuco gubernatorial election =

- October 3, 2010
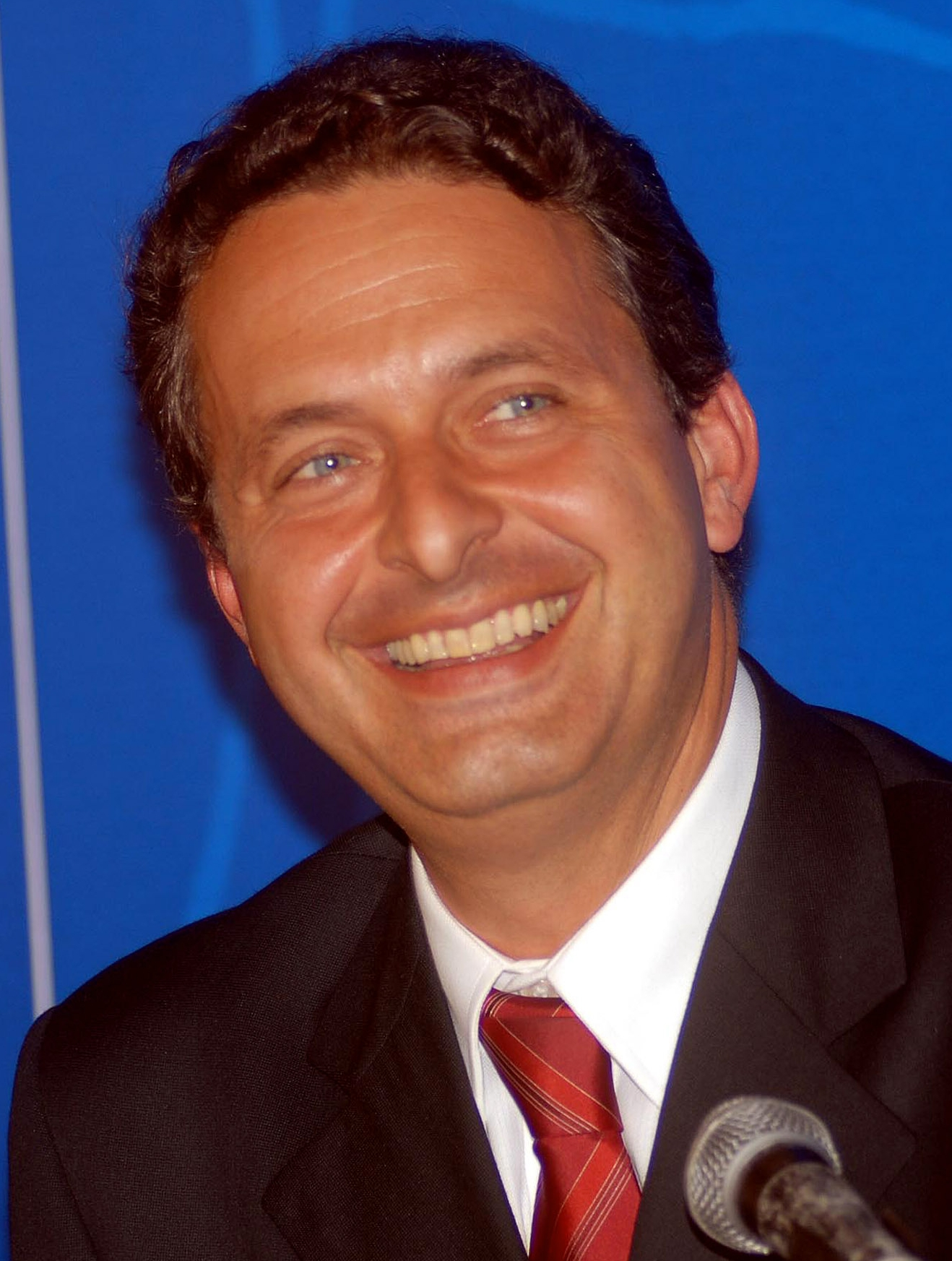

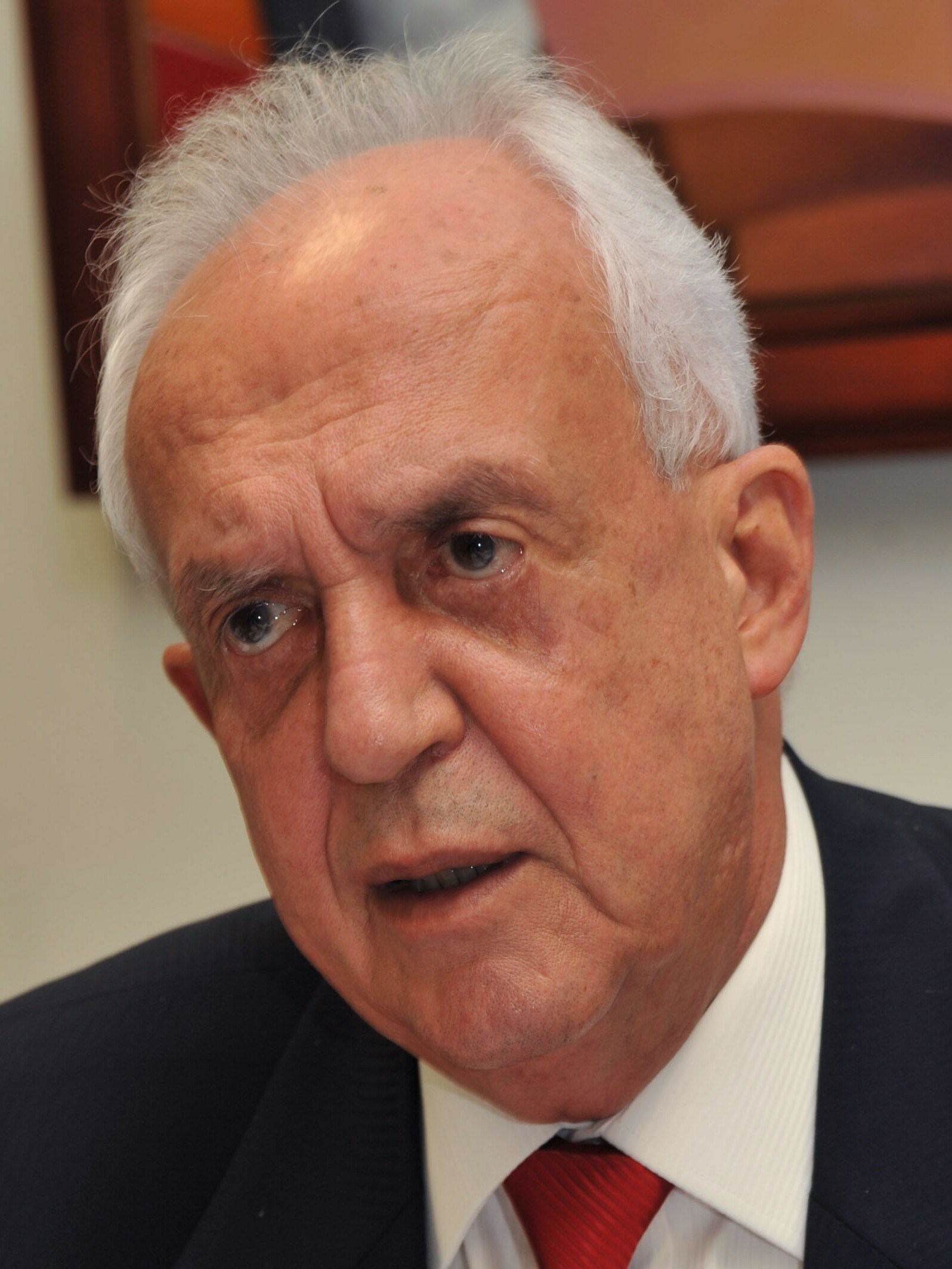
Nominee	Eduardo Campos	Jarbas Vasconcelos
Party	PSB	MDB
Running mate	João Soares Lyra Neto	Miriam Lacerda
Popular vote	3,450,874	585,724
Percentage	82.84%	14.06%
Governor before election
Eduardo Campos
PSB
Elected Governor
Eduardo Campos
PSB

The Pernambuco gubernatorial election was held on October 3, 2010 to elect the next governor of Pernambuco. The PSB's Eduardo Campos won reelection in a landslide.
