= Gurupi =

Municipality in Tocantins, Brazil

- Município de Gurupi; Municipality of Gurupi
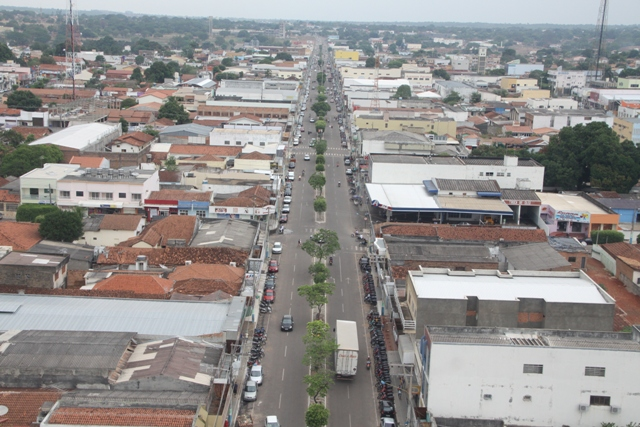
- View of central Gurupi

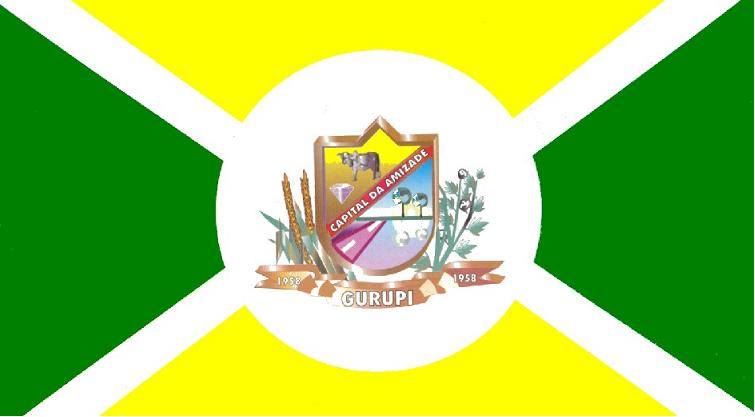
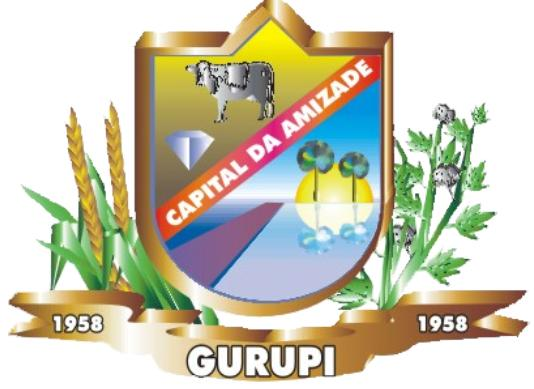
- Flag Coat of arms

- Location of Gurupi in the state of Tocantins

- Location of Gurupi in Brazil
- Coordinates: 11°43′48″S 49°04′08″W
- Region: Norte
- State: Tocantins
- Founded: 14 November 1958

Government
  - Mayor: Josi Nunes

Area
  - Total: 1,846.65 km^{2} (713.00 sq mi)
  - Land: 1,836.091 km^{2} (708.919 sq mi)

Population (2020)
  - Total: 87,545
  - Density: 46.09/km^{2} (119.4/sq mi)
- Time zone: UTC−3 (BRT)
- Postal code: 77400000

Gurupi, Tocantins is a city and a municipality in the Brazilian state of Tocantins. The estimated population was 87,545 inhabitants in 2020, the third-largest in the state, and the total area of the municipality was 1,836 km^{2}. The elevation is around 287 meters in the city.

== Geography ==
It is located in the south of the state of Tocantins, between latitude 11 and 12, 240 km. from Palmas, the recently built capital of this state that was formed from the state of Goiás. It is 596 km. from Brasília. It lies between two great rivers that flow in the direction of the Amazon: the Araguaia and Tocantins rivers.

The soil is fertile, allowing agriculture and cattle raising. The climate is hot tropical, hot all year, with a rainy season between the months of October to April and a dry season between the months of May to September. The average annual temperature is around 35 °C.

== History ==
The history of the city is connected to the construction of the Belém-Brasília highway, reason for the appearance and development of many other cities along its extension in the former north of the state of Goiás.

== Etymology ==
The name Gurupi is a Tupi word meaning "pure diamond". It consists of two basic elements: "guru" (diamond) and "pi" (foot, way, base, pure origin).

== Economy, urban design, and infrastructure ==
Gurupi is a major agricultural producer of soybeans and sugar cane, while becoming an important cotton producer too.

The city is served by Gurupi Airport.

The avenues of the city have the names of Brazilian states, while the streets have the names of historical figures.

== Education ==
There is a campus of the Federal University of Tocantins with a course in agronomy. In addition, there is a municipal public college, Faculdade Unirg, which offers 14 courses.

== Sport ==
The local football team is Gurupi EC who play at the 3000 capacity Estádio Gilberto Resende. They compete in the Campeonato Tocantinense which they have won 6 times, but have made 3 Série C appearances; in 1995, 1996 and in 2004.

== See also ==
- List of municipalities in Tocantins
