= Marcelo Miranda (politician) =

Brazilian politician (born 1961)

Marcelo Miranda (born 10 October 1961) is an ex-governor of the Brazilian state of Tocantins. He is a member of the Brazilian Democratic Movement.
