= Legislative Assembly of the State of Tocantins =

Legislative Assembly of Tocantins Assembleia Legislativa do Tocantins
- 10th Legislature
- Tocantins coat of arms

Type
- Type: Unicameral

History
- Founded: January 1, 1989

Leadership
- President: Amélio Cayres, Republicans
- Leader of government: Eduardo do Dertins, Cidadania

Structure
- Seats: 24
- Political groups: List: Republicanos (7); PL (4); PSD (3); PSDB (2); UNIÃO (2); Cidadania (1); PCdoB (1); PDT (1); PSB (1); PV (1); Solidariedade (1)

Elections
- Voting system: Proportional representation (D'Hondt method)
- Last election: October, 2022
- Next election: October, 2026

Meeting place
- Palácio Dep. João D'Abreu, Palmas

Website
- www.al.to.br

The Legislative Assembly of the State of Tocantins (Aleto; Portuguese: Assembleia Legislativa do Estado do Tocantins) is the legislative body of the state of Tocantins in Brazil. It consists of 24 state deputies, elected statewide by proportional representation for 4-year electoral terms. It's based on the state capital, the city of Palmas, at the Sunflower Square.

== Current legislature ==
=== Board of the Assembly ===
The board for the period of 2023/24 is composed by the deputiesː

Posição	Nome	Partido
Presidente	Amelio Cayres	Republicanos
1º Vice-presidente	Léo Barbosa	Republicanos
2º Vice-presidente	Vanda Monteiro	UNIÃO
1º Secretário	Vilmar de Oliveira	Solidarity
2º Secretário	Moisemar Marinho	PSB
3º Secretário	Luciano Oliveira	PSD
4º Secretário	Jair Farias	UNIÃO
