= Tocantins =

State of Brazil

- State
- Flag Coat of arms
- Motto: "Co yvy ore retama" (Translated from Tupi: "This land is ours")
- Anthem: Hino do Tocantins
- Location in Brazil
- Coordinates: 10°11′S 48°20′W
- Country: Brazil
- Capital and largest city: Palmas

Government
  - Type: Unitary state
  - Governor: Wanderlei Barbosa (Republicanos)
  - Vice Governor: Laurez da Rocha Moreira (PSD)
  - Senators: Eduardo Gomes (PL); Irajá Abreu (PSD); Dorinha Rezende (UNIÃO)
  - Legislature: Legislative Assembly of Tocantins

Area
  - Total: 277,620.91 km^{2} (107,190.03 sq mi)
  - Rank: 10th

Population (2022)
  - Total: 1,511,460
  - Rank: 24th
  - Density: 5.44433/km^{2} (14.1008/sq mi)
  - Rank: 22nd
- Demonym: Tocantinense

GDP (2024)
  - Total: R$68.088 billion (US$12.635 billion)

HDI
  - Year: 2024
  - Category: 0.797 – high (11th)
- Time zone: UTC−3 (BRT)
- Postal Code: 77000-000 to 77999-000
- ISO 3166 code: BR-TO
- Website: www.to.gov.br

Tocantins (Brazilian Portuguese: [tokɐ̃ˈtʃĩs] (Note: The presented pronunciation is in the Brazilian Portuguese variant spoken in Tocantins (and most of Brazil).)) is one of the 26 states of Brazil. It is the newest state, formed in 1988 and encompassing what had formerly been the northern two-fifths of the state of Goiás. Tocantins covers 277,620.91 square kilometres (107,190.03 mi^{2}) and had an estimated population of 1,595,994 in 2026. Construction of its capital, Palmas, began in 1989; most of the other cities in the state date to the Portuguese colonial period. With the exception of Araguaína, there are few other cities with a significant population in the state. The government has invested in a new capital, a major hydropower dam, railroads and related infrastructure to develop this primarily agricultural area. The state has 0.75% of the Brazilian population and is responsible for 0.5% of the Brazilian GDP.

Tocantins has attracted hundreds of thousands of new residents, primarily to Palmas. It is building on its hydropower resources. The Araguaia and Tocantins rivers drain the largest watershed that lies entirely inside Brazilian territory. The Rio Tocantins has been dammed for hydropower, creating a large reservoir that has become a center of recreation. Because it is in the central zone of the country, Tocantins has characteristics of the Amazon Basin, and also semi-open pastures, known as cerrado. Bananal Island, in the southwest of the State, is the second largest fluvial island in the world. Tocantins is also home to the Araguaia National Park, the Carajás Indian reservations, and Jalapão State Park, which is about 250 kilometres (160 mi) from Palmas. There, the rivers create oases in the dry landscape, attracting many ecotourists to the region.

== Etymology ==
The name "Tocantins" refers to the Tocantins River, which itself derives from the Tupi language words tukã´, "toucan", and tï, "beak", literally "Toucan's beak".

== Geography ==
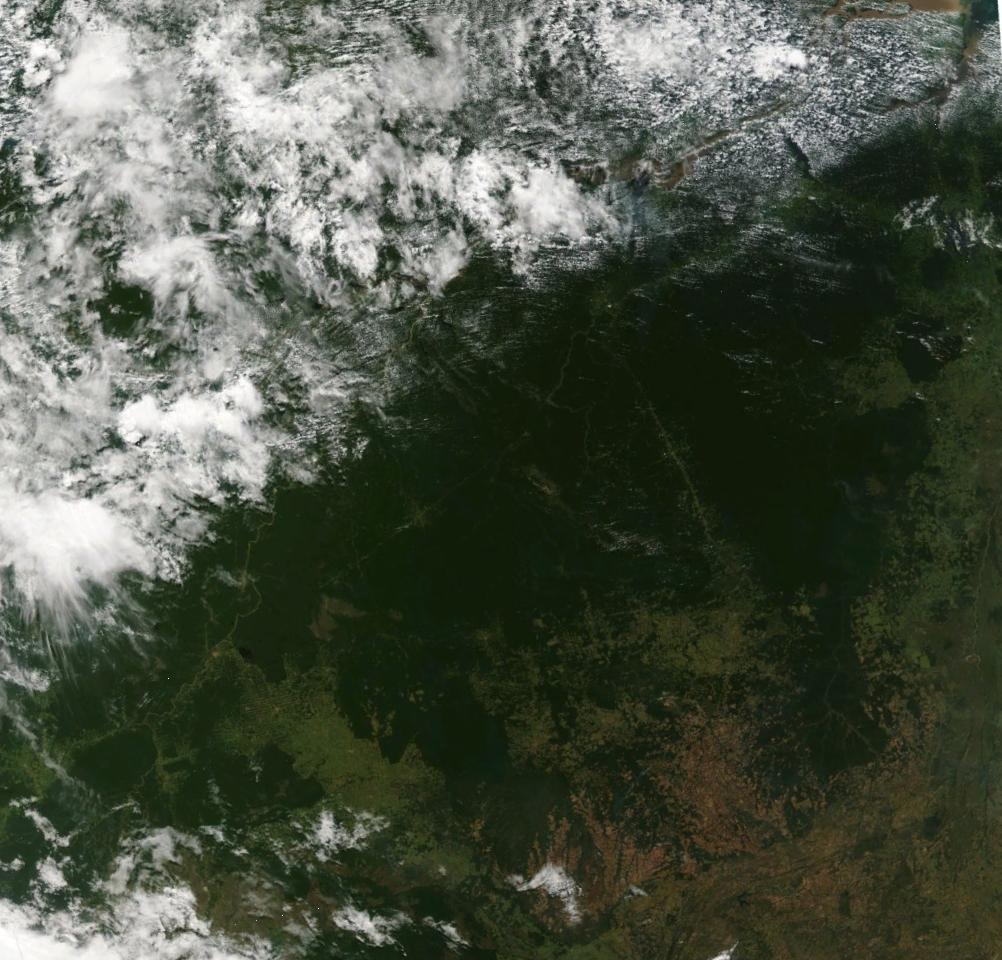
Amazon rainforest

The geography of Tocantins is varied. It straddles both the Amazon rainforest and the coastal savanna. Many rivers (including the Tocantins River) traverse the state. Researchers have identified more than 20 archaeologically significant sites related to indigenous cultures.

Tocantins is bordered to the northeast by the states of Maranhão and Piauí, Bahia to the east, Goiás to the south, Mato Grosso to the west, and Pará to the northwest. Tocantins was created from the northern two-fifths of Goiás state in 1989 and is divided into 139 municipalities.

Following its separation from Goiás, the new state was transferred from Brazil's Central-West Region to the North Region.

=== Climate ===
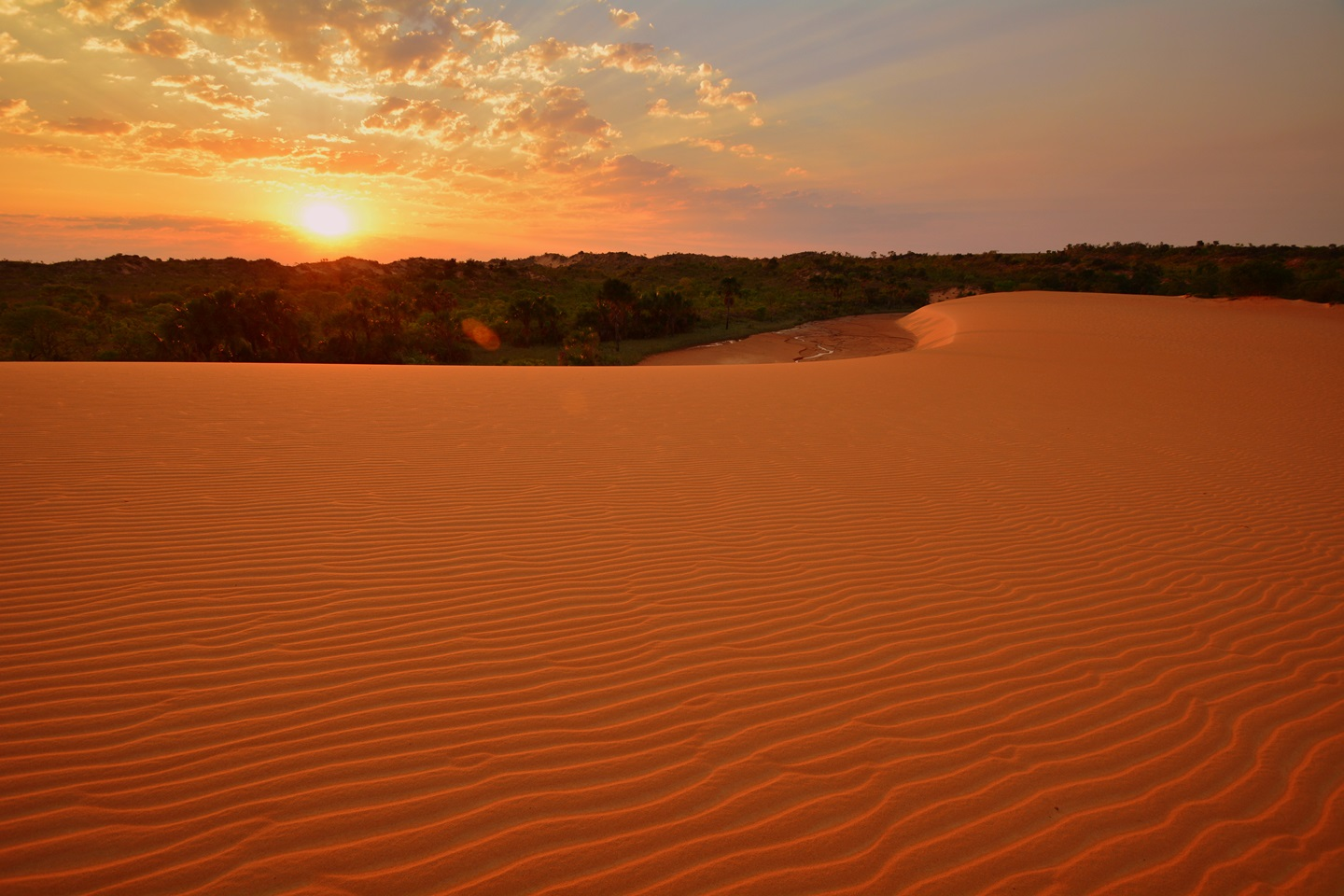
Jalapão in Tocantins

Most of Tocantins (except the extreme western and northern regions) is situated within a vast Brazilian area known as the cerrado. The cerrado region's typical climate is hot and semi-humid, with pronounced seasonal variation marked by a dry winter from May through October. The average annual rainfall is around 1500 mm.

=== Vegetation ===
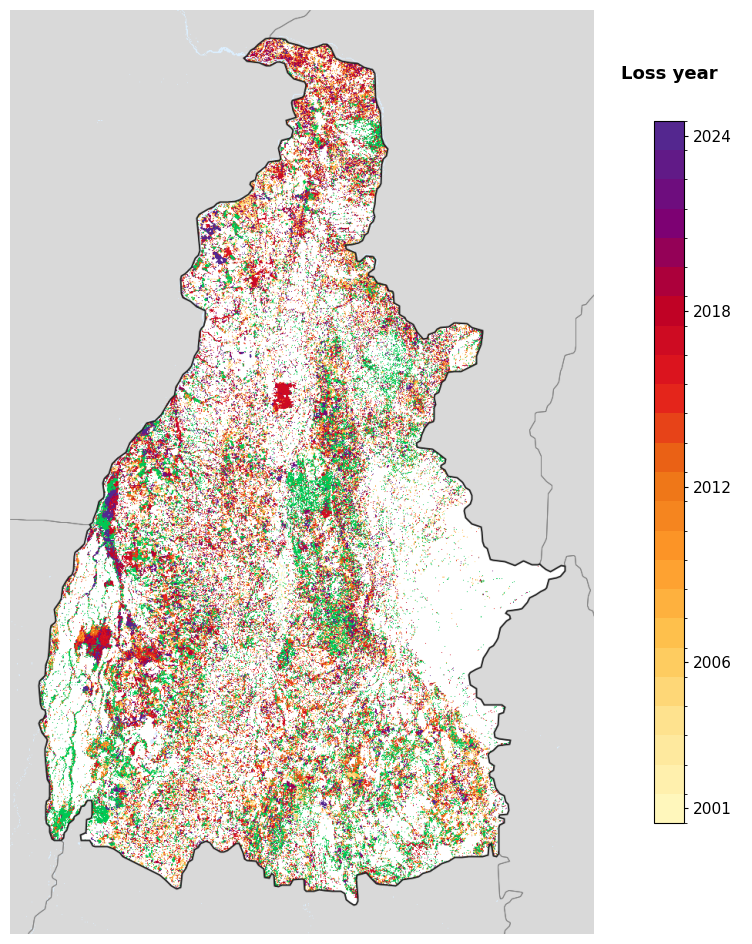
Tree-cover loss year in Tocantins, 2001-2024, from the Global Forest Change dataset.

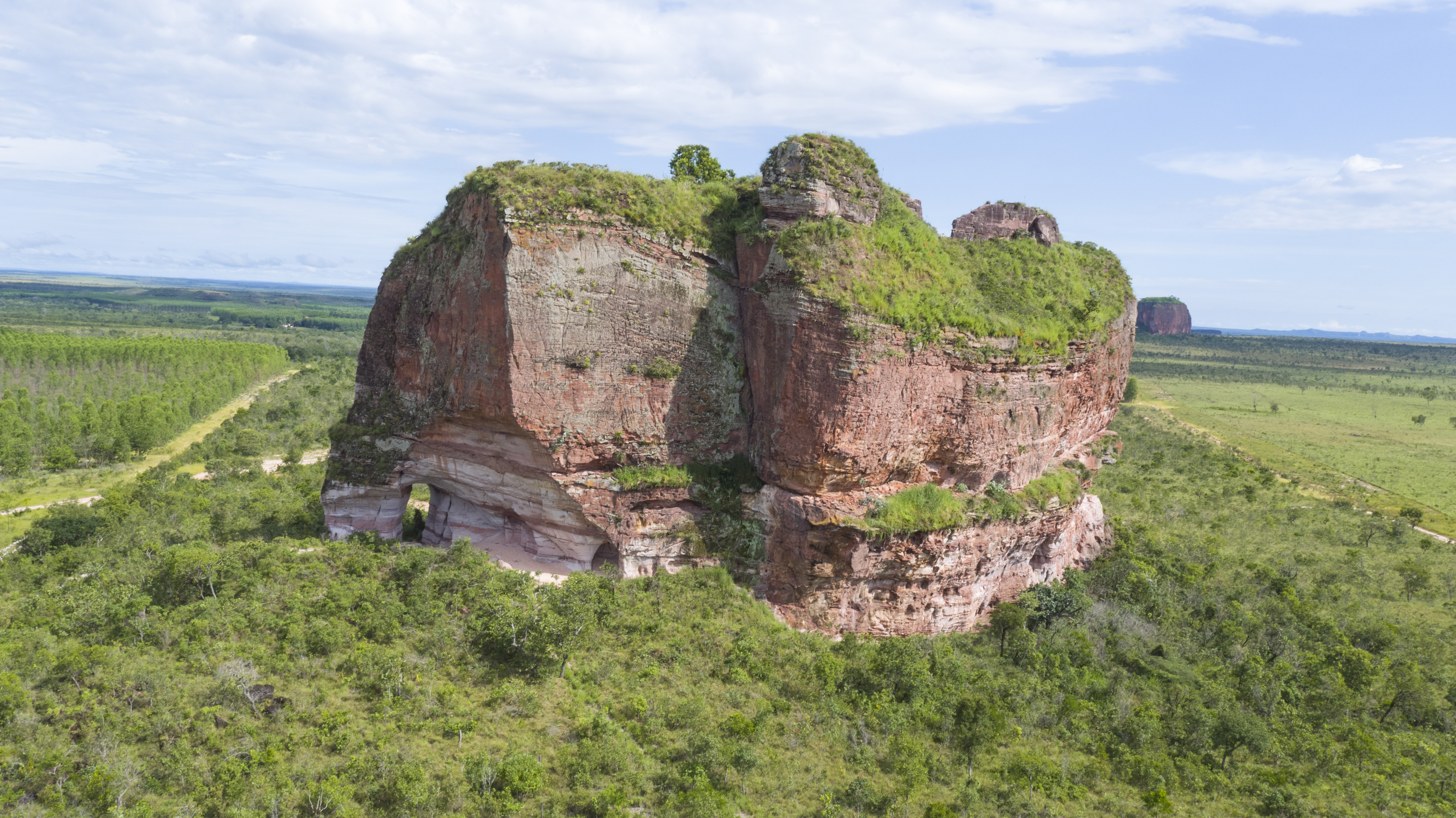
Serra Geral do Tocantins Ecological Station

The "cerrado" landscape cover 87% of Tocantins and is characterized by extensive savanna formations crossed by gallery forests and stream valleys. Cerrado includes various types of vegetation. Humid fields and "buriti" palm paths are found where the water table is near the surface. Alpine pastures occur at higher altitudes and mesophytic forests on more fertile soils. In the north of Tocantins the cerrado gives place to a zone of transition for the Amazon biome, near Tocantins River.

The savanna formations are not homogenous. There is great variation between the amount of woody and herbaceous vegetation, forming a gradient from completely open "cerrado" — open fields dominated by grasses — to the closed, forest-like "cerrado" and the "cerradão" ("big cerrado"), a closed canopy forest. Intermediate forms include the dirty field, the "cerrado" field, and the "cerrado" sensu stricto, according to a growing density of trees.

The "cerrado" trees have characteristic twisted trunks covered by a thick bark, and leaves that are usually broad and rigid. Many herbaceous plants have extensive roots to store water and nutrients. The plant's thick bark and roots serve as adaptations for the periodic fires which sweep the cerrado landscape. The adaptations protect the plants from destruction and make them capable of sprouting again after the fire.

As in many savannas in the world, the "cerrado" ecosystems have been coexisting with fire since ancient times. Initially they developed adaptations to natural fires caused by lightning or volcanic activity.

Along the western boundary of the state is the floodplain of the Araguaia River, which includes extensive wetlands and Amazon tropical forest ecosystems. Bananal Island, formed by two branches of the Araguaia, is said to be the largest river island in the world. It consists mostly of marshlands and seasonally flooded savannas, with gallery forest. Where the two branches meet again they form an inland delta called Cantão, a typical Amazonian igapó flooded forest. The Araguaia is also one of the main links between the Amazonian lowlands and the Pantanal wetlands to the south, but the river is not fully navigable.

== History ==
Map of the province of Araguaia, that would be created during the Empire of Brazil, 1873. Today, Tocantins lies in this area. National Archives of Brazil.

Before 1988, Tocantins made up the northern two-fifths or one-third of Goiás. While part of Goiás, this region was isolated due to precariously navigable rivers and mountainous terrain. As a result, the southern area of the state became more developed, particularly after this area was selected in 1956 as the site for the development of the new capital of Brasília and the Federal District. Economic underdevelopment and cultural differences led to the creation of organizations like the Casa do Estudante do Norte Goiano (CENOG) and Comissão de Estudantes do Norte de Goiás (CONORTE) that vouched for Tocantins to emancipate from Goiás.

In the 1970s, the population of northern Goiás lobbied the government to establish a separate state. In the 1988 Constitution, the State of Tocantins was created and admitted as a new Brazilian state.

Since its establishment and investment by the government, as in the new capital of Palmas, Tocantins has been the fastest-growing Brazilian state. Its thriving economy is based on agriculture and agro-industry, attracting thousands of migrants from all over the country. The construction of the long-planned North–South Railway is expected to further boost economic growth.

== Demographics ==
According to the 2022 census, there were 1,511,460 people residing in the state. The population density was 5.45/km^{2} (14.1/sq mi).

Urbanization: 71.5% (2004); Population growth: 2.6% (1991–2000); Houses: 355,502 (2005).

The 2022 census revealed the following numbers: 939,260 Pardos (brown, multiracial) people (62.1%), 350,613 White people (23.2%), 199,394 Black people (13.2%), 18,735 Amerindian people (1.2%), 3,405 Asian people (0.2%).

=== Largest cities ===
Largest cities or towns in Tocantins (2011 census by the Brazilian Institute of Geography and Statistics)
Rank		Mesoregion	Pop.	Rank		Mesoregion	Pop.
1	Palmas	Oriental	235,315	11	Dianópolis	Oriental	19,110
2	Araguaína	Ocidental	153,350	12	Formoso do Araguaia	Ocidental	18,428
3	Gurupi	Ocidental	77,655	13	Augustinópolis	Ocidental	15,965
4	Porto Nacional	Oriental	49,143	14	Taguatinga	Oriental	15,053
5	Paraíso do Tocantins	Ocidental	44,432	15	Miranorte	Ocidental	12,626
6	Araguatins	Ocidental	31,324	16	Goiatins	Oriental	12,064
7	Colinas do Tocantins	Ocidental	30,879	17	Pedro Afonso	Oriental	11,542
8	Guaraí	Ocidental	23,212	18	Xambioá	Ocidental	11,484
9	Tocantinópolis	Ocidental	22,608	19	Wanderlândia	Ocidental	10,978
10	Miracema do Tocantins	Ocidental	20,692	20	Nova Olinda	Ocidental	10,686

Historical population
Year	Pop.	±%
1940	165,188	—
1950	204,041	+23.5%
1960	328,486	+61.0%
1970	537,563	+63.6%
1980	738,688	+37.4%
1991	920,116	+24.6%
2000	1,157,690	+25.8%
2010	1,383,445	+19.5%
2022	1,511,460	+9.3%

== Economy ==
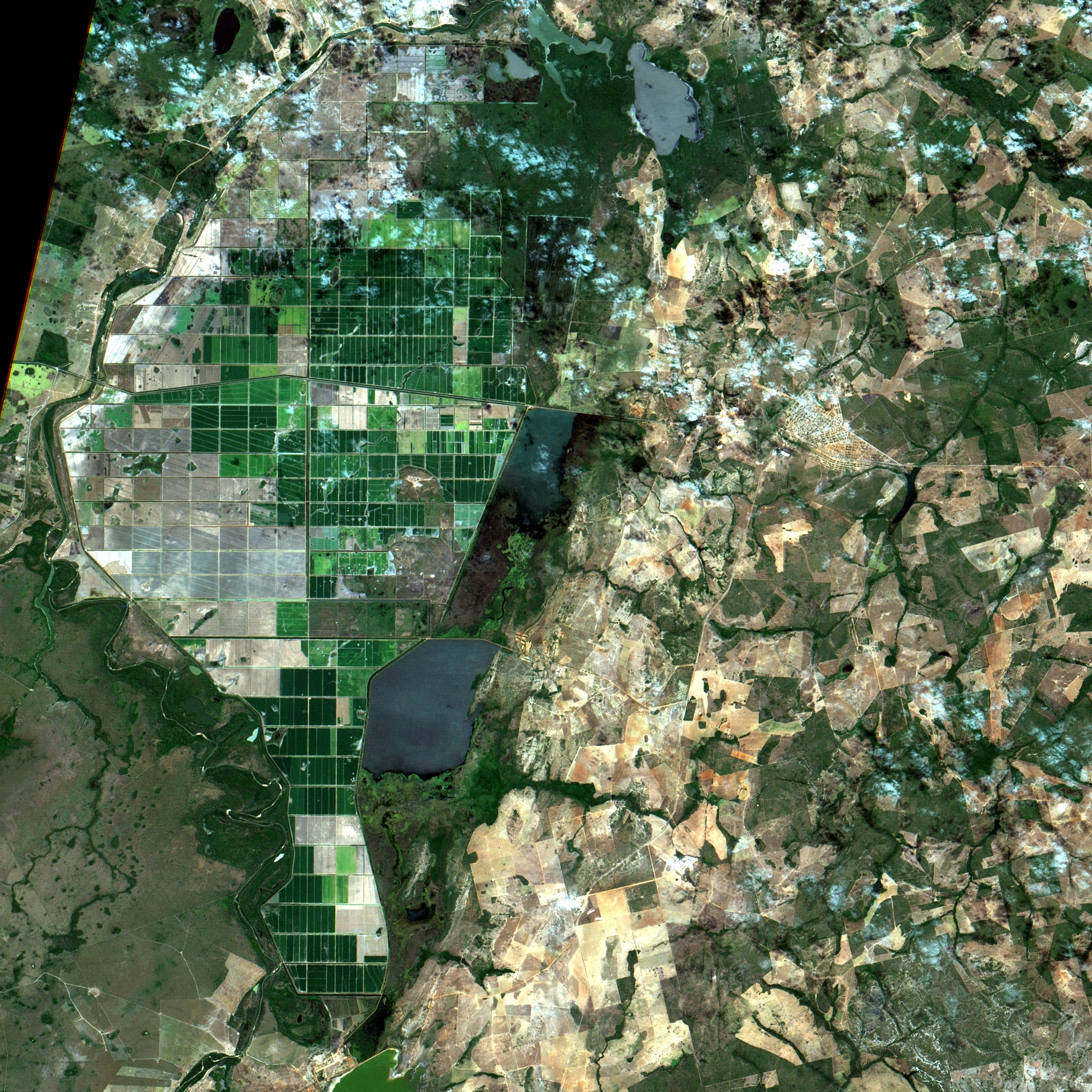
Irrigated rice in Formoso do Araguaia

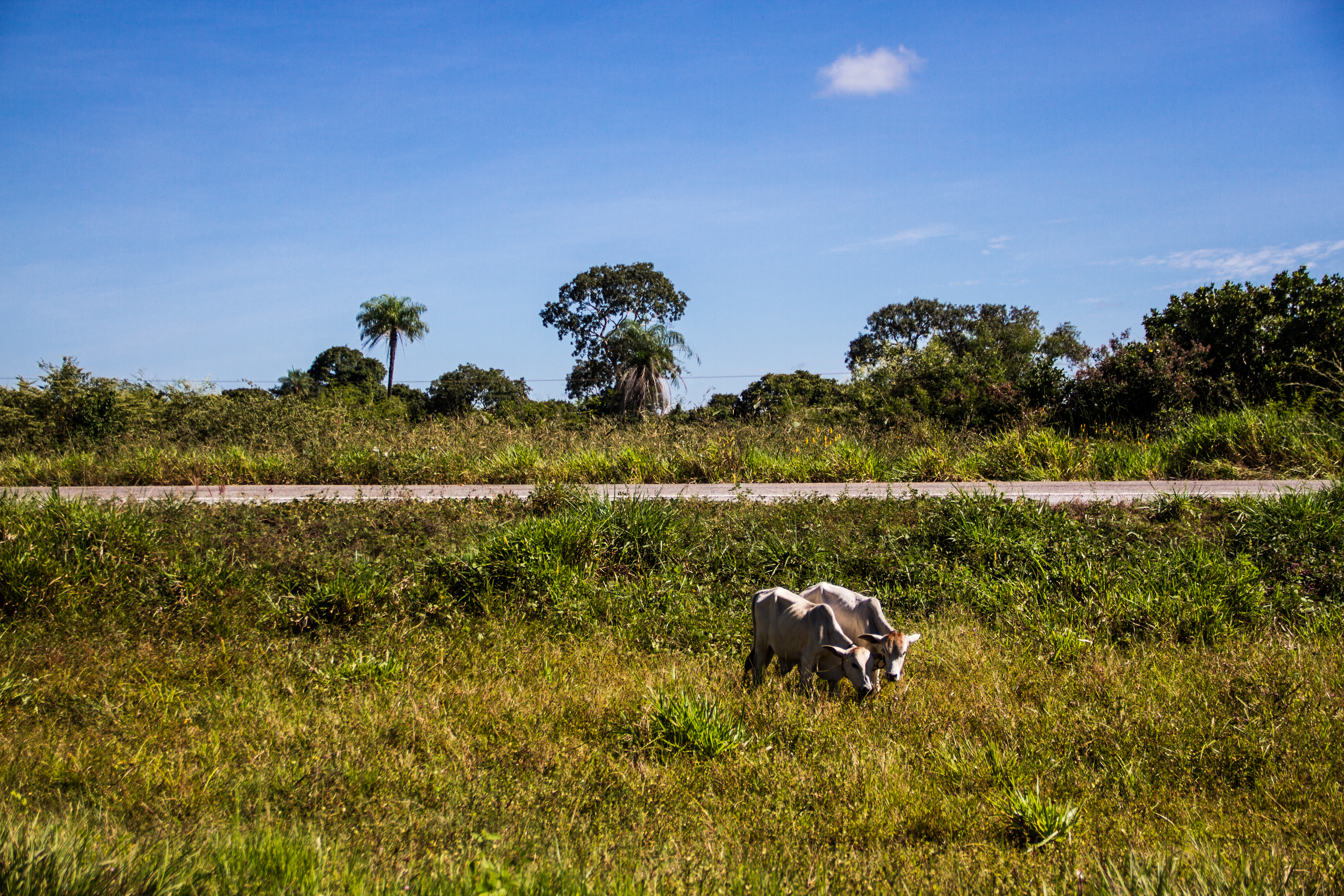
Cattle in Tocantins

The service sector is the largest component of GDP at 59.9%, followed by the industrial sector at 27.2%. Agriculture represents 12.9% of GDP (2004). Tocantins exports: soybean 89.2%, beef 10.5% (2002). Tocantins' economy is based on an aggressive expansionist model of agro-exports and is marked by consecutive records of primary hyper-surpluses: its exports reveal its strong agricultural inclination. Following the example of neighboring states (Mato Grosso and Goiás), it is becoming a major grain producer (soy, corn, rice).

As with much of Brazil, Tocantins' economy is also dependent on cattle ranching. The state's pineapple plantations is considerable. In the state's north, charcoal and oils are extracted from the babaçu palm tree.

The gross value of the state's agricultural production was estimated at more than R$7.6 billion in 2019.

In soy, Tocantins is the largest producer in the northern region of Brazil. In the 2019 harvest, Tocantins harvested 3 million tons.

In maize, the state harvested close to 1 million tonnes in 2019.

In 2019 Tocantins was the leader in rice production in the North region, becoming the 3rd largest producer in Brazil. Harvested more than 670 thousand tons in the 2016/2017 harvest.

Regarding pineapple, in 2018 Tocantins was the 6th largest producer state in Brazil, with 69 million fruits.

In 2019 the state's cattle herd was 8 million animals.

About industry, Tocantins had an industrial GDP of R$4.5 billion in 2017, equivalent to 0.4% of the national industry. It employs 30,234 workers in the industry. The main industrial sectors are: Construction (34.1%), Industrial Services of Public Utility, such as Electricity and Water (28.4%), Food (22.5%), Non-metallic minerals (5.2%) and Chemicals (1.5%). These 5 sectors concentrate 91.7% of the state's industry.

Its industry is mainly agroindustry, centralized in six districts located in five pole cities: Palmas, Araguaína, Gurupi, Porto Nacional and Paraíso do Tocantins. Its industry is still small and focused mainly on domestic consumption.

In the tertiary sector (commerce and services), its main activities are concentrated in the capital Palmas and also in the cities that are located on the side of the Belém-Brasília Highway (BR-153 and BR-226). This highway is vital for Tocantins, as it cuts the state from north to south and allows for a better performance in the economic growth of the cities located on its banks, serving as a warehouse for road transport and services for travelers. In addition, the Belém-Brasília Highway also facilitates the flow of production from Tocantins to other states and to ports on the coast.

== Infrastructure ==
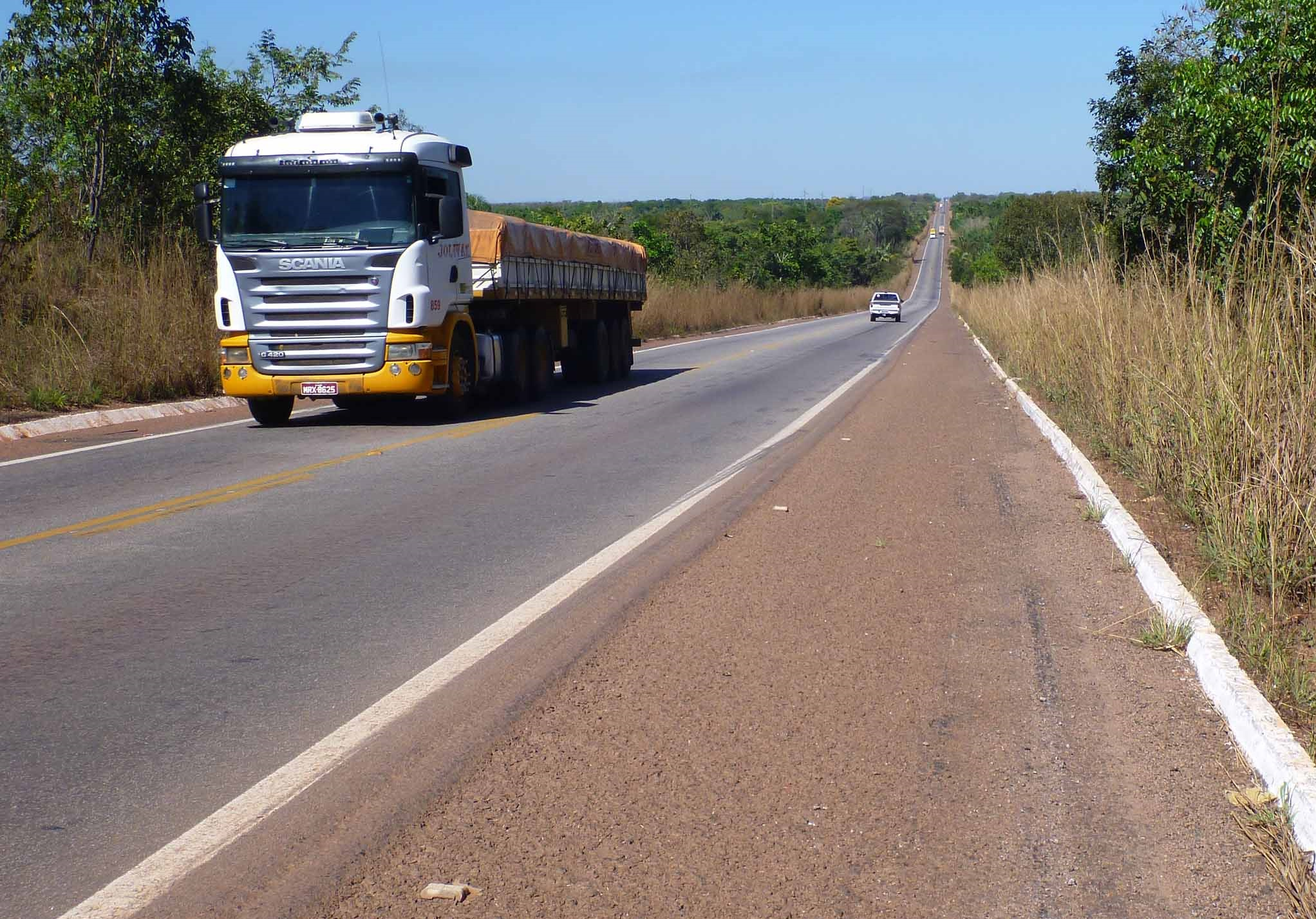
The BR-153 (also known as Belém–Brasília Highway) is the main highway of the Tocantins state.

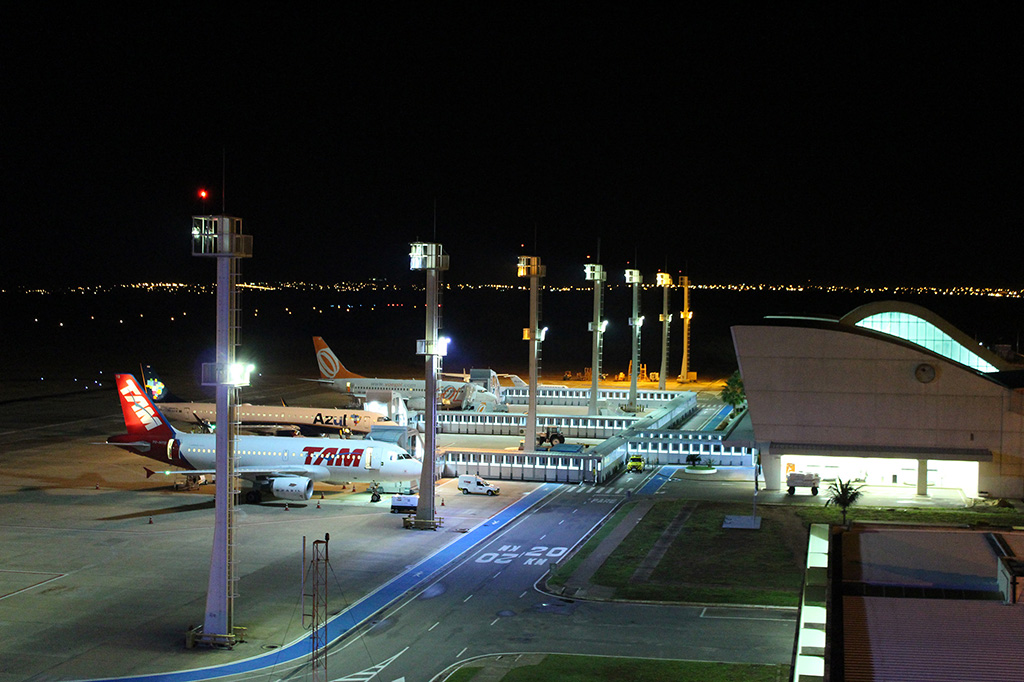
Palmas Airport

The main federal highways in Tocantins are BR-153 and BR-226, which together form the road axis of the Belém-Brasília Highway. The others are BR-010, BR-235, and BR-242. These last highways still have many sections that are unpaved or even incomplete. In Tocantins, the Belém-Brasília Highway (BR-153 and BR-226) was the first highway to be built and paved in the state, having been built during the late 1950s.

Tocantins has three airports served by regular flights: Palmas Airport, Araguaína Airport and Gurupi Airport. All other airports in the state are served only by air taxi companies.

The North–South Railway (or EF-151) is in the construction process, being operated regularly from Aguiarnópolis to Porto Nacional by VLI while the West–East Integration Railway (or EF-334) is still in the planning phase on the stretch that will pass through the state. The railway already connects Açailândia to Anápolis, but the section south of Porto Nacional is not operated regularly as there are no yards for loading/unloading wagons. Valec is still studying the concession model for the railway.

The state's main waterways are the Tocantins River and Araguaia River waterways.

== Flag ==
The message of the flag is the phrase "where the sun rises for all". In the middle of the flag is the golden yellow sun, with its rays symbolically targeting to the future of the state. The sun is placed on a white band, where the white color represents peace. The blue in the upper left and the yellow in the bottom right represent the waters and the soil of the state. The colors date back to a flag used by the Autonomous Government of Palmas in the 19th century.

The flag was adopted with the state flag law (law no 094/89) of November 17, 1989.

== Cities ==
Tocantins contains 139 municipalities. For statistical purposes, the Brazilian Institute of Geography and Statistics (IBGE) divides the state into two mesoregions containing eight micro-regions. These statistical divisions were revised in 2017.

Important cities include:

- Tocantinópolis
- Colinas do Tocantins
- Araguaína
- Gurupi
- Palmas, capital of the state
- Dianópolis
- Porto Nacional

== Represented in popular culture ==
Survivor: Tocantins was the setting for the eighteenth season of the United States reality show Survivor, filmed in the microregion of Jalapão in Tocantins. The premiere aired February 12, 2009.
