= List of quilombola communities in Tocantins =

The following is a list of quilombola communities in Tocantins as designated by the Palmares Cultural Foundation and awarded land title by the Instituto Nacional de Colonização e Reforma Agrária through the provisions of the 1988 Constitution. In addition, this list may include territories which received title through state-level agricultural reform agencies. This is not to be confused with the larger list of quilombola communities throughout Brazil, most of which are designated by the Palmares Cultural Foundation but not awarded land title by INCRA or equivalent state agencies.

== List of communities ==
Region	State	Municipality	Quilombola community
North	TO	Almas	Baião
North	TO	Almas	Poço Dantas
North	TO	Aragominas	Pé do Morro
North	TO	Aragominas	Projeto da Baviera
North	TO	Araguatins	Ilha São Vicente
North	TO	Arraias	Fazenda Lagoa dos Patos e Fazendas Káagados
North	TO	Arraias	Lagoa da Pedra
North	TO	Arraias, Paranã	Mimoso
North	TO	Brejinho de Nazaré	Córrego Fundo
North	TO	Brejinho de Nazaré	Curralinho do Pontal
North	TO	Brejinho de Nazaré	Malhadinha
North	TO	Brejinho de Nazaré	Manoel João
North	TO	Chapada da Natividade	Chapada da Natividade
North	TO	Chapada da Natividade	São José
North	TO	Conceição do Tocantins	Água Branca
North	TO	Conceição do Tocantins	Matões
North	TO	Dianópolis	Lajeado
North	TO	Dois Irmãos do Tocantins	Santa Maria das Mangueiras
North	TO	Esperantina	Carrapiché
North	TO	Esperantina	Ciríaco
North	TO	Esperantina	Praiachata
North	TO	Filadélfia	Grotão
North	TO	Jaú do Tocantins	Rio das Almas
North	TO	Lagoa do Tocantins, Novo Accordo, Santa Tereza do Tocantins	Barra do Aroeira
North	TO	Mateiros	Ambrósio, Carrapato e Formiga
North	TO	Mateiros	Boa Esperança
North	TO	Mateiros	Margens do Rio Novo, Riachão e Rio Preto
North	TO	Mateiros	Mumbuca
North	TO	Monte do Carmo	Mata Grande
North	TO	Muricilândia	Dona Juscelina
North	TO	Natividade	Redenção
North	TO	Paranã	Claro, Ouro Fino e Prata
North	TO	Ponte Alta do Tocantins	Lagoa Azul
North	TO	Porto Alegre do Tocantins	Laginha
North	TO	Porto Alegre do Tocantins	São Joaquim
North	TO	Santa Fé do Araguaia	Cocalinho
North	TO	Santa Rosa do Tocantins	Morro de São João
North	TO	São Félix do Tocantins	Povoado do Prata

== List of territories ==
Quilombola territories titled or in the process of being titled in Brazil.
Order	quilombola land	Communities	County	State	Issuing body	Families	Claimed area (ha)	Title Size (ha)	Title date (dd/mm/year)	Notes
187	Barra do Aroeira	Barra do Aroeira	Santa Tereza do Tocantins	Tocantins	ITERTINS	174	62.315,3819	197,6504	29/07/2021	Current title is 1% of claimed area
187	Barra do Aroeira	Barra do Aroeira	Santa Tereza do Tocantins	Tocantins	ITERTINS	174	62.315,3819	714,9511	05/08/2021	Current title is 1% of claimed area
	Ilha de São Vicente	Ilha de São Vicente	Araguatins	Tocantins	INCRA	48	2.479,2844	2.479,2844	20/11/2023	
