= Microregion of Jalapão =

Jalapão
- Microregion
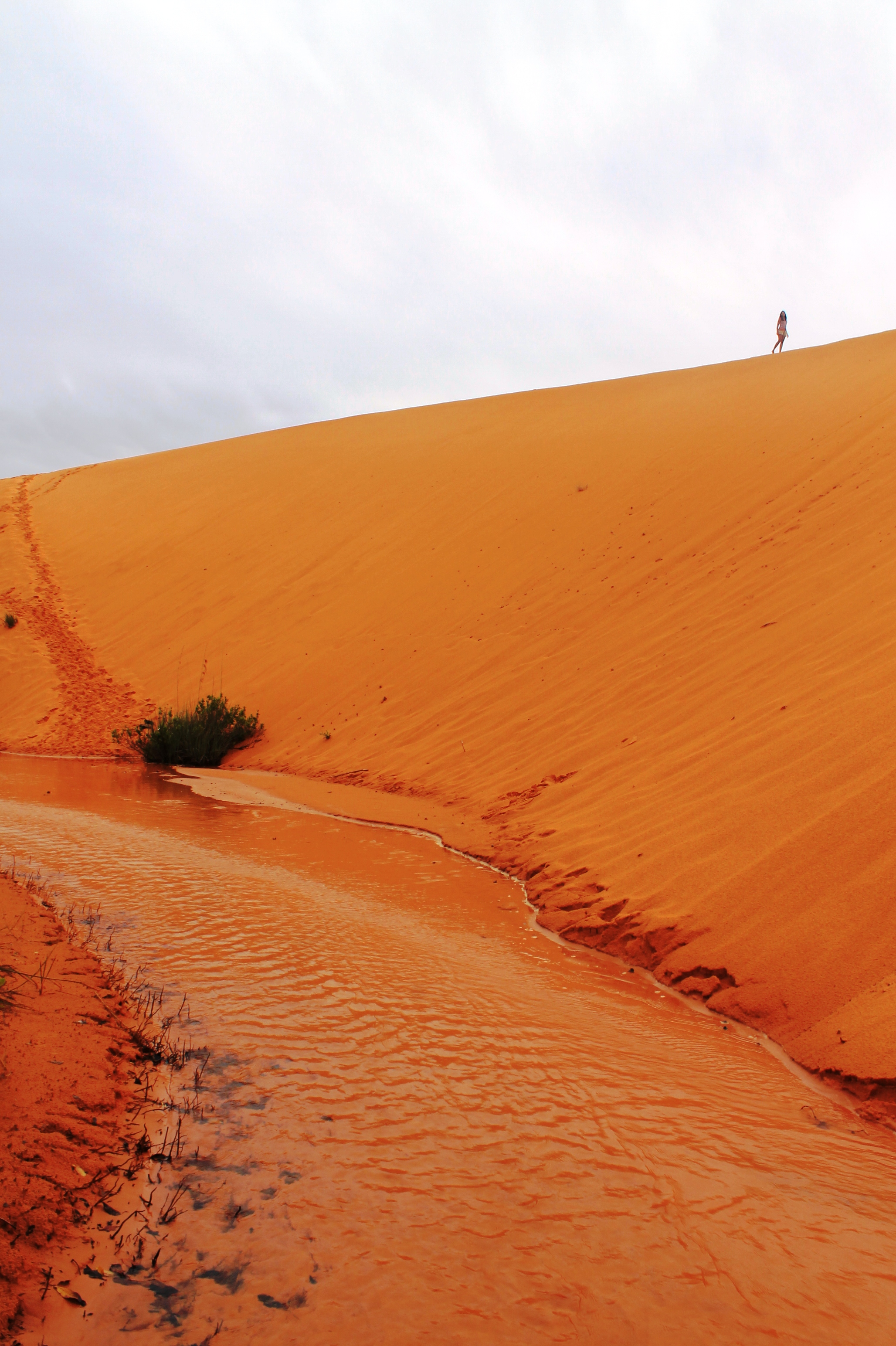
- Dunes in Jalapão

- Location within Brazil
- Coordinates: 10.359°S 46.699°W
- Country: Brazil
- State: Tocantins
- Microregion: Jalapão

Jalapão is a semi-arid microregion in the state of Tocantins, Brazil. Parts of the microregion have dramatic landscapes with large orange sand dunes, towering rock formations and fast-flowing clear rivers and streams. This is attractive to tourists, and led to Jalapão being chosen for a season of the US version of the Survivor TV series.

== Geography ==
The Jalapão region has an area of 34,000 square kilometres (13,000 sq mi) and covers the municipalities of Lagoa do Tocantins, Lizarda, Santa Tereza do Tocantins, Mateiros, Novo Acordo, Ponte Alta do Tocantins and São Félix do Tocantins. It has an arid savanna climate with orange sand dunes and rock formations, but is crossed by many fast-flowing rivers and streams. Conservation units include the Jalapão State Park, the Nascentes do Rio Parnaíba National Park, the Serra Geral do Tocantins Ecological Station, the Serra da Tabatinga Environmental Protection Area and the Jalapão Environmental Protection Area.

== Tourism ==
The region is a destination for adventure tourism and ecotourism, with the main attractions in Mateiros, Novo Acordo, Ponte Alta and São Félix. The dunes of fine orange sand reach 40 metres (130 ft) in height. The Cachoeira da Velha, a horseshoe-shaped waterfall 100 metres (330 ft) wide and 15 metres (49 ft) high. The Mumbuca and Prata villages, formerly quilombo, let tourists experience the local culture. The Serra do Espirito Santo is an interesting rock formation.

The 18th season of Survivor TV series, Survivor: Tocantins, was shot in the Jalapão region. (Note: One of the Survivor "tribes" from that season was named Jalapao, after the region.) Residents and local media complained about areas being closed and environmental damage. The producers said the closures were temporary in the areas where filming was being done, and they were committed to restore any damage.

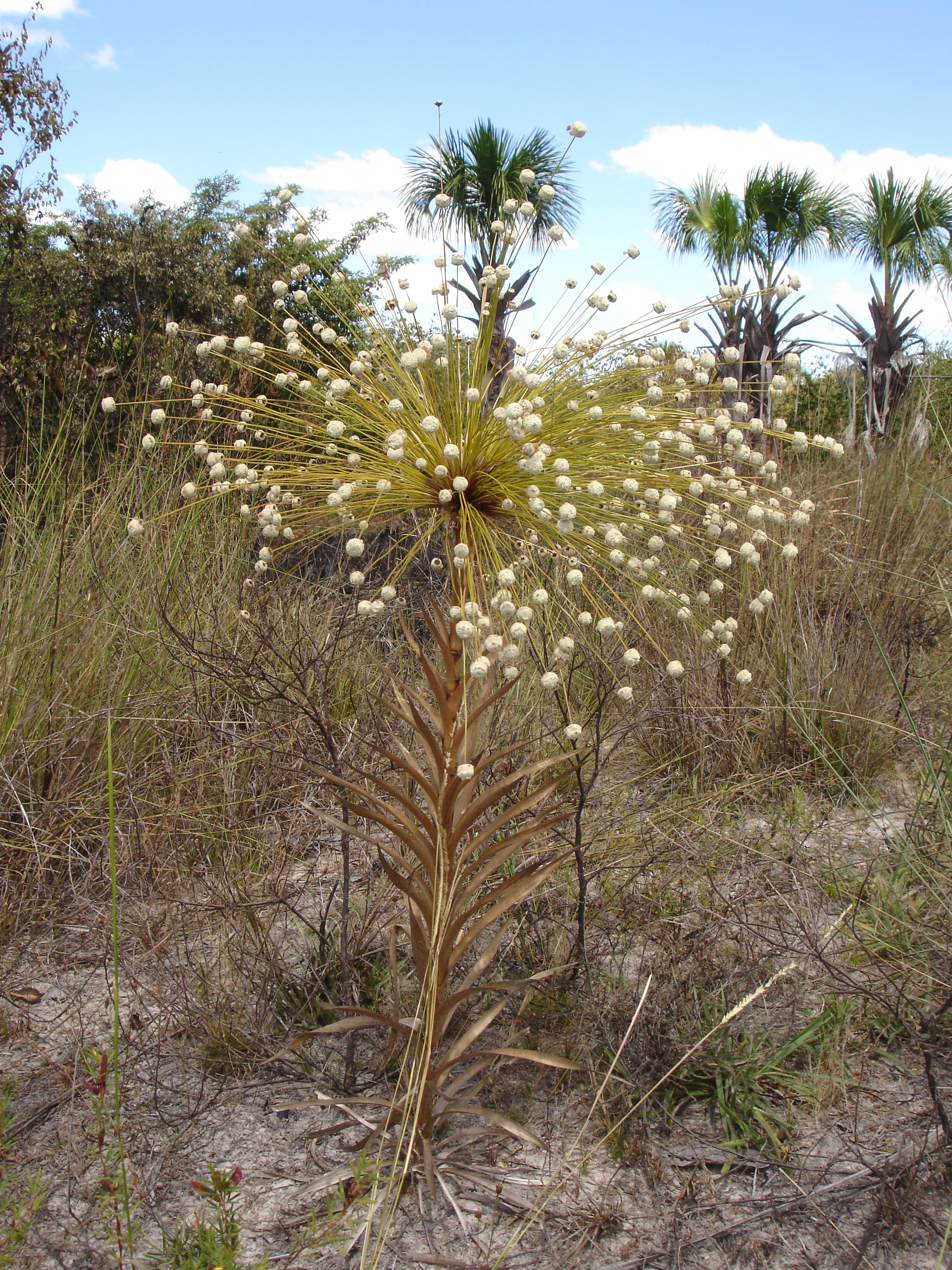

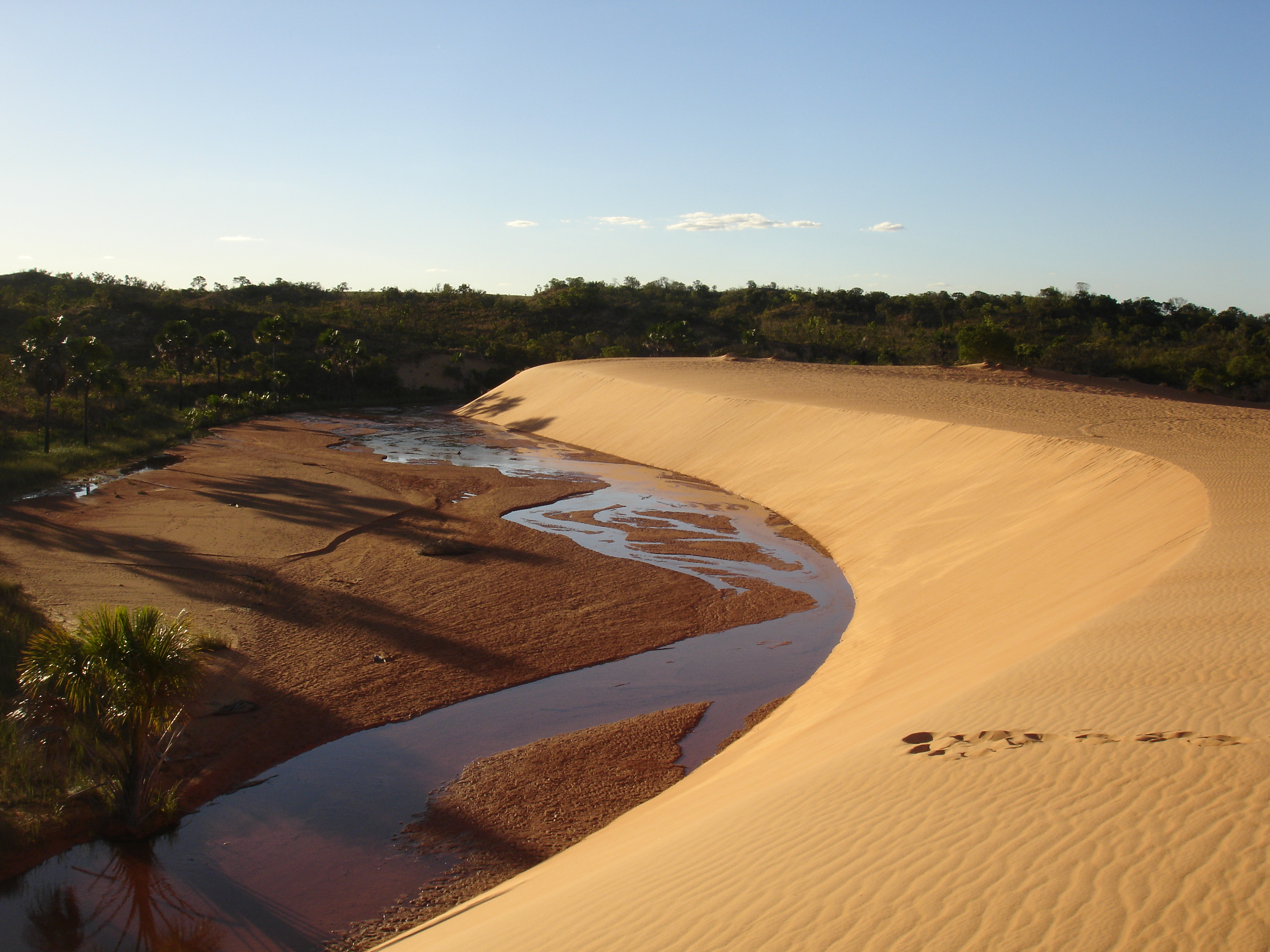

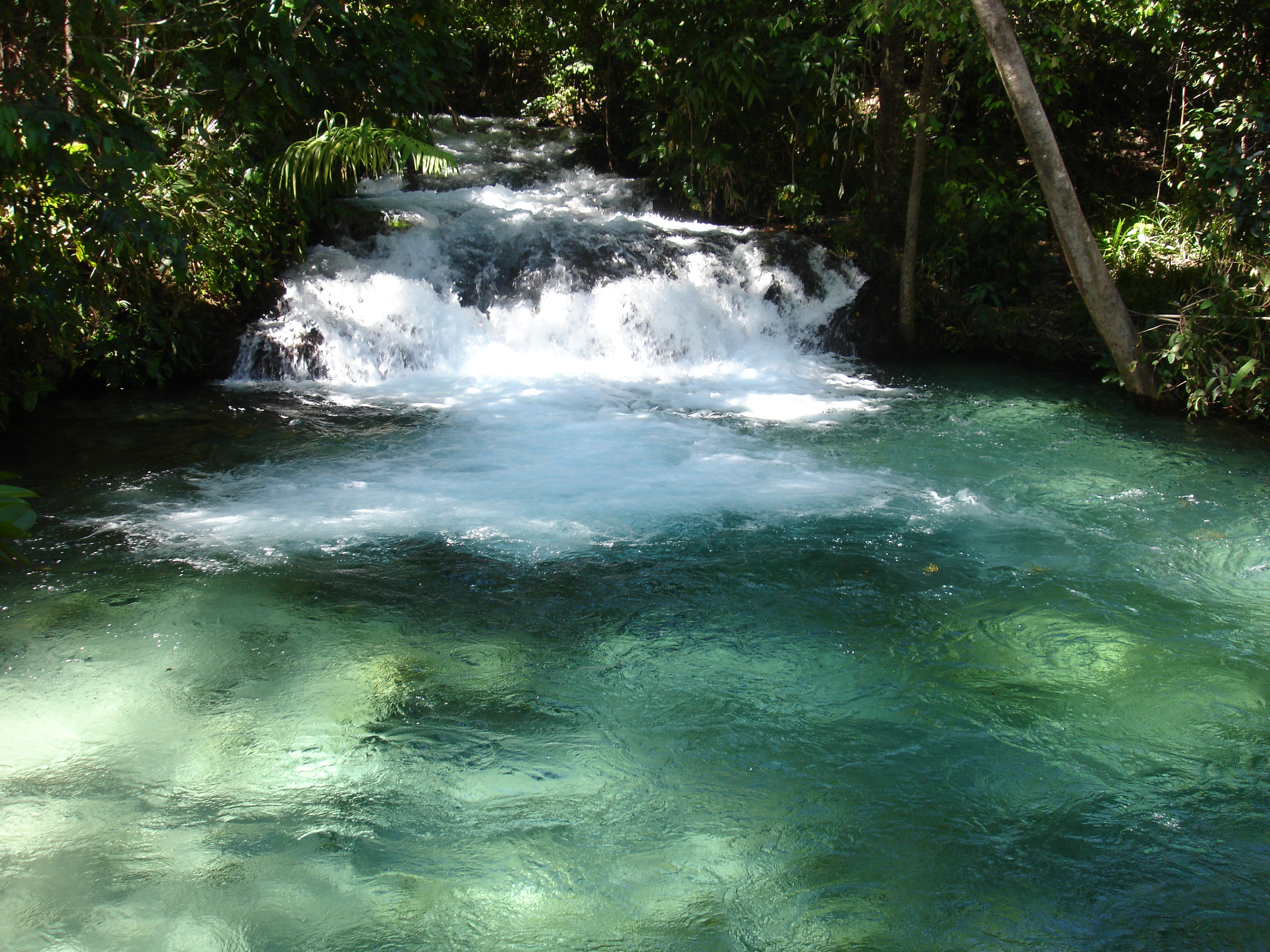

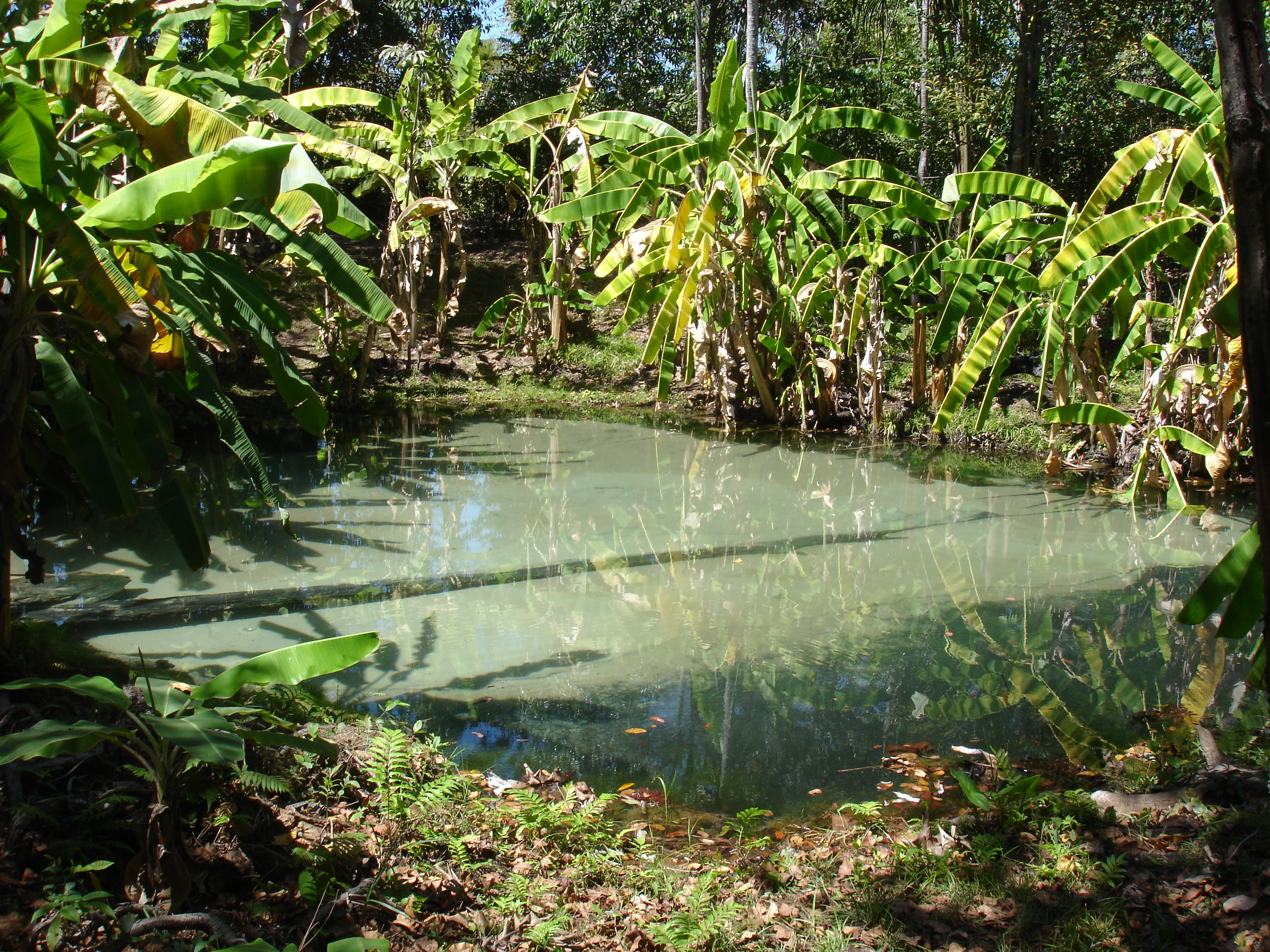

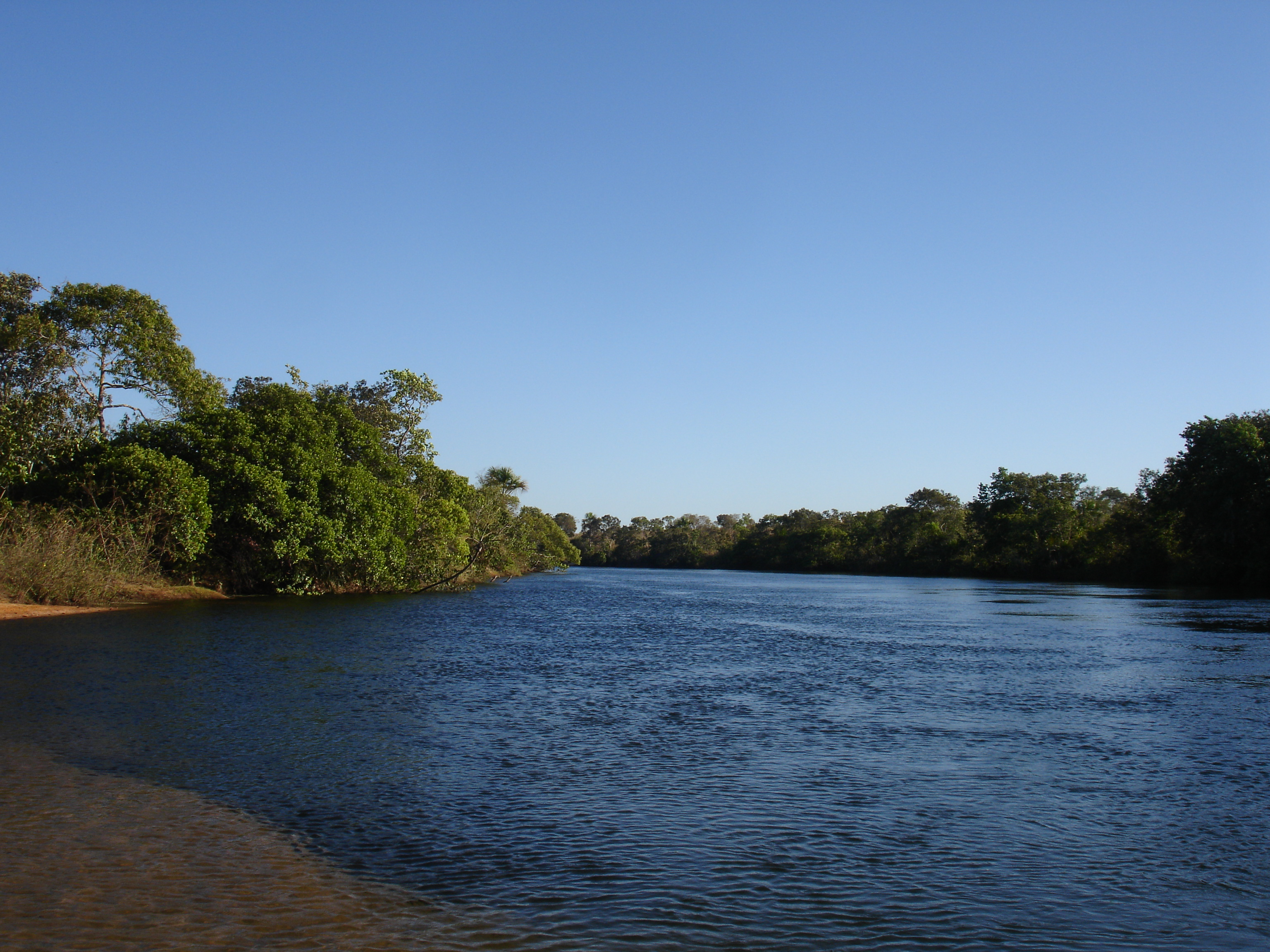

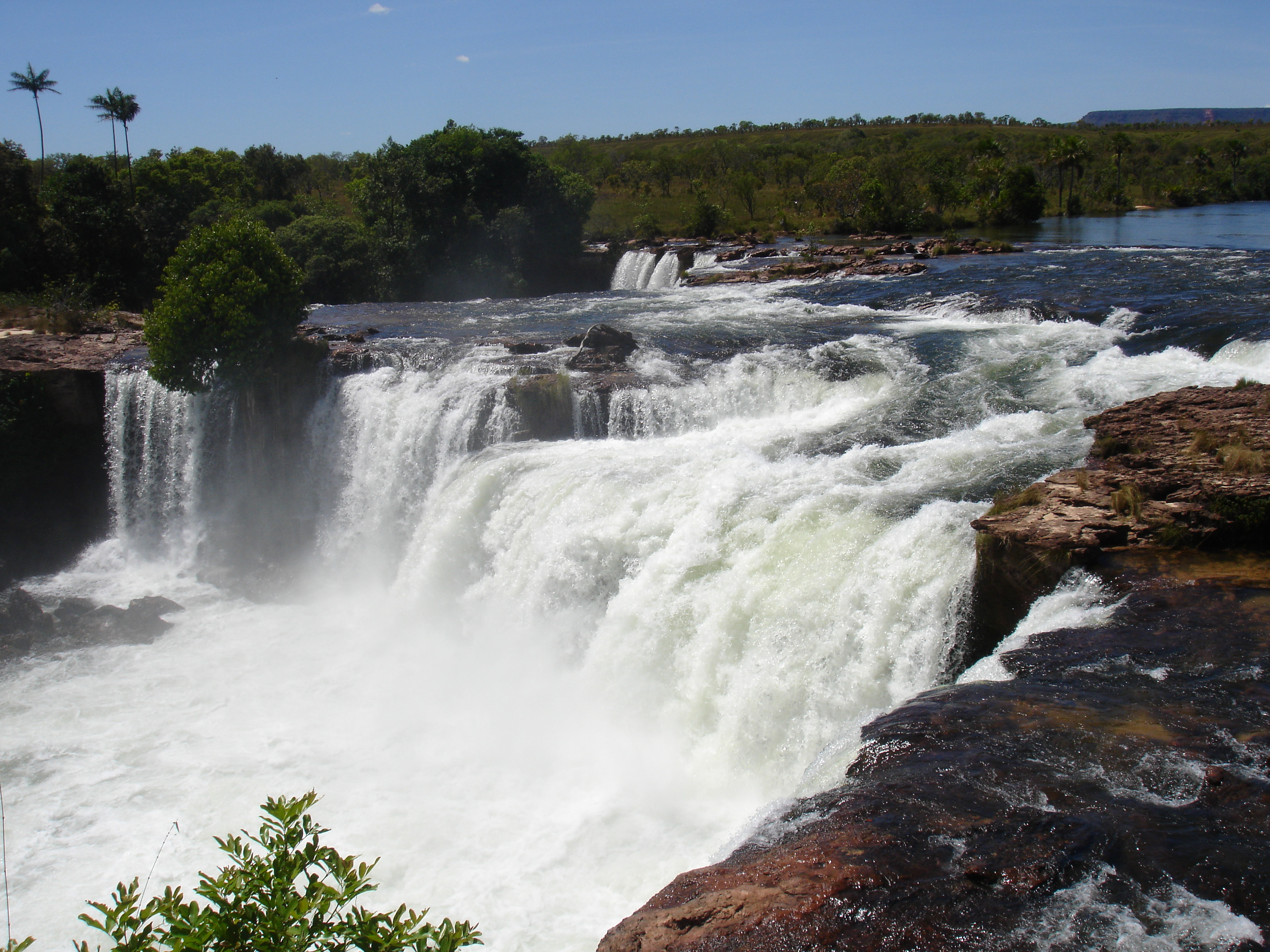

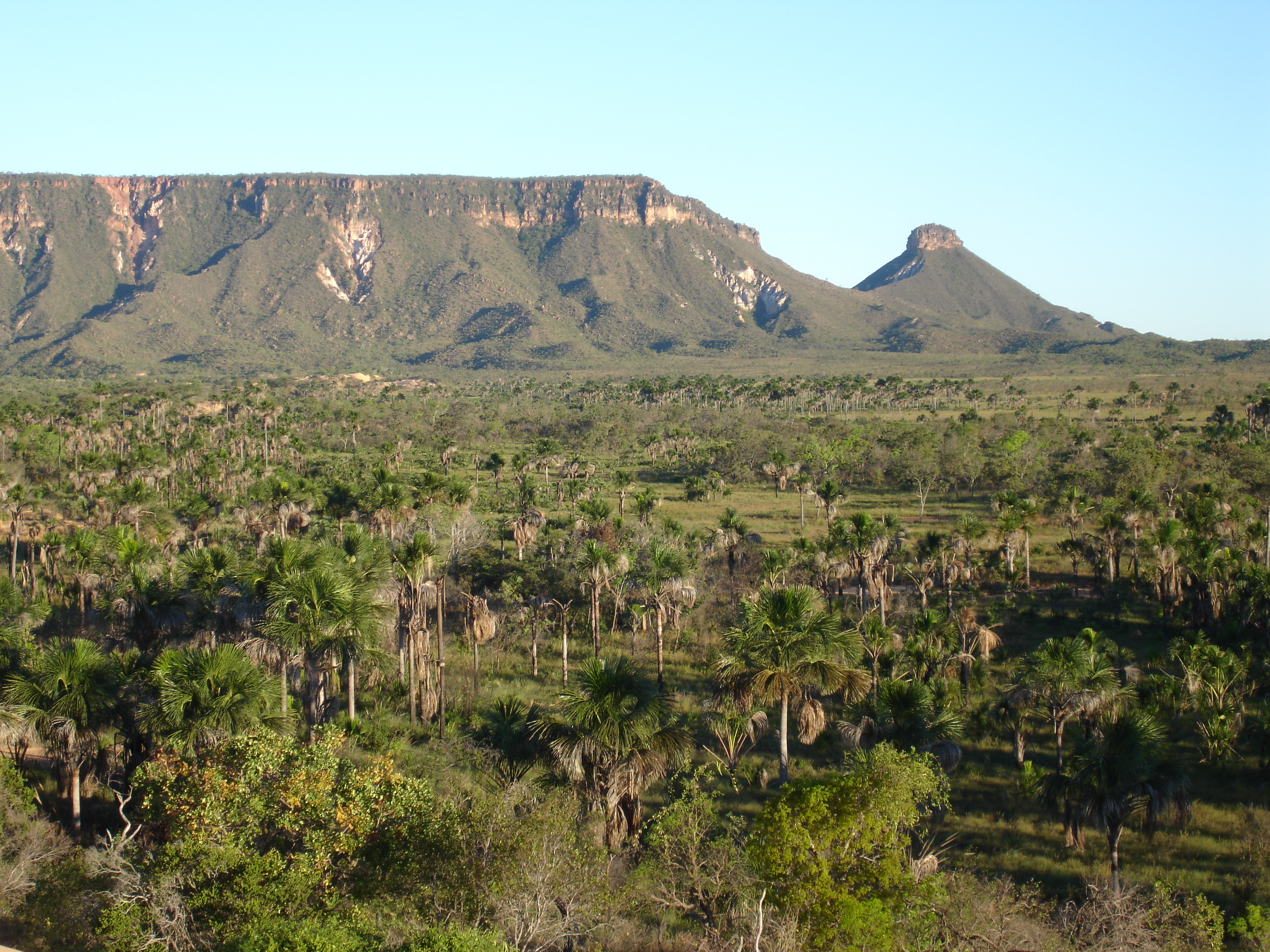

== Sources ==
- "Como chegar/Mapa", Turismo Tocantins (in Portuguese)
- "Encantos do Jalapão", Turismo Tocantins (in Portuguese)
- Sara Uhelski (December 2008), "E a polêmica continua… Jalapão x Survivor", Vivo Verde (in Portuguese)
