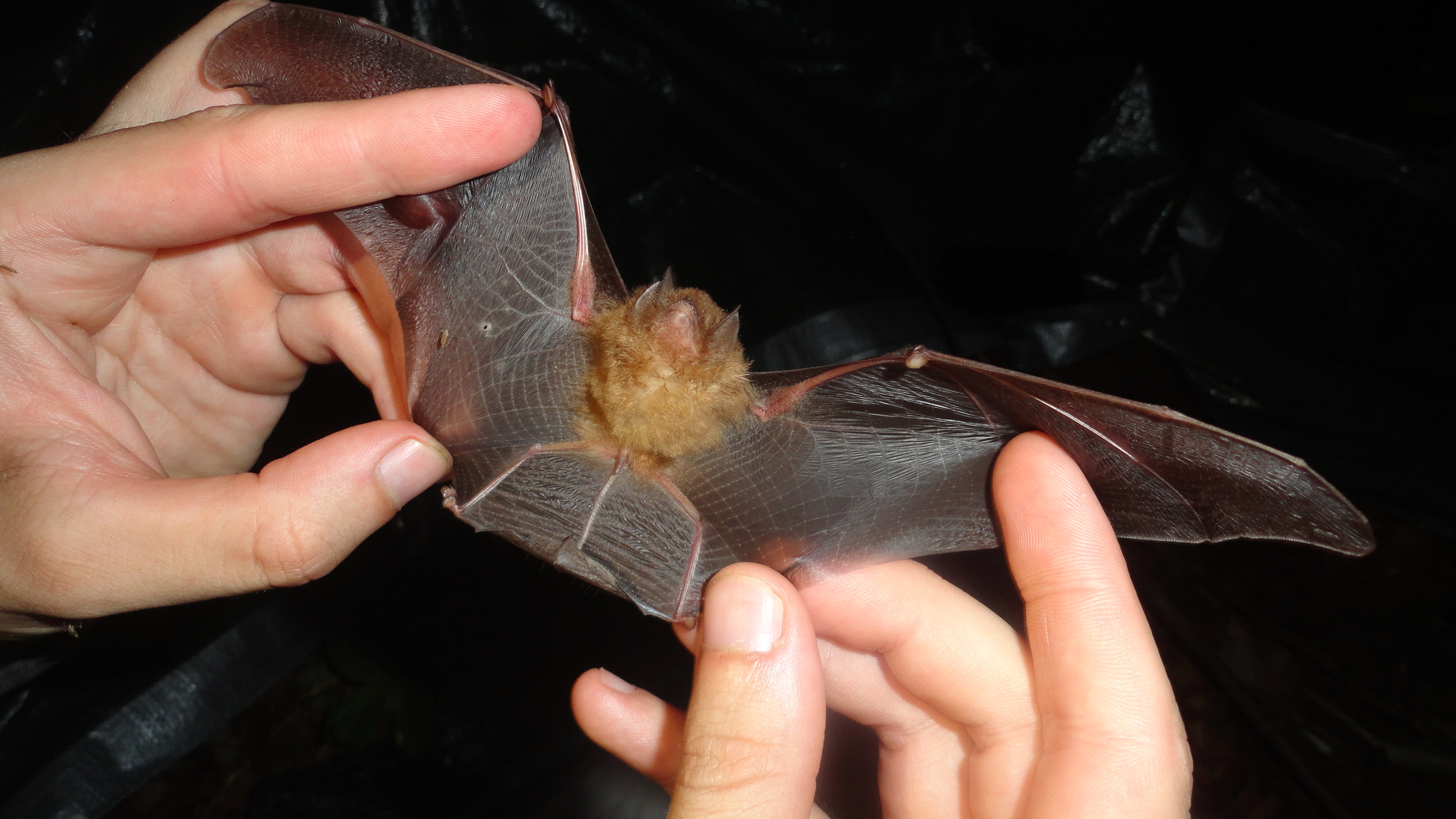

Conservation status
- Least Concern (IUCN 3.1)

Scientific classification
- Kingdom: Animalia
- Phylum: Chordata
- Class: Mammalia
- Order: Chiroptera
- Family: Thyropteridae
- Genus: Thyroptera
- Species: T. discifera

Binomial name
- Thyroptera discifera Lichtenstein & Peters, 1855

= Peters's disk-winged bat =

Species of bat

Peters's disk-winged bat (Thyroptera discifera) is a bat species mainly found in South and Central America. It belongs to the family Thyropteridae, a small group of disk-winged bats. They are the smallest species of their genus and are characterized by yellowish brown ventral pelage that is slightly paler than that on the back. They have a distinguishing feature of circular, suction disks at the base of their thumbs and hind feet. They use these suction disks to cling onto young unfurling banana or heliconia leaves to roost while avoiding rain and predators. They are very similar in appearance and easily confused with Thyroptera tricolor which has a paler venter than dorsum, and two cartilaginous projections on the calcar.

== Description ==
Bats in the family Thyropteridae do not have a noseleaf but instead have warts above their nostrils. They are smaller bats with long and slender snouts. T. discifera is the smallest of the family and possess thick lips, small eyes, and fairly large ears that extend from the eyes to the edge of the mouth. The tragus is present and the ears are covered in hair on the front side. Their entire body is also covered in fine, long hairs usually reddish brown in color. Suction disks are contained on the feet along with those at the base of their thumbs. The head and body length range from 37 to 47 millimetres (1.5 to 1.9 in) with a tail length of 24 to 33 millimetres (0.94 to 1.30 in). Their diet consists mostly of insects.

== Distribution and habitat ==
Peters' disk-winged bats can be found in Peru to northern South America. Previous material thought to be that of T. tricolor has been found to be T. discifera and the range has been extended over 1,000 km to the east and documentation of presence in the Atlantic Forest of Cerrado of Brazil has been found. They are distributed from Nicaragua southward to Bolivia and eastern Brazil where they inhabit lowland, secondary and semi-deciduous forests. Their habitat consists of rainforests and surrounding dry forests. The species has also been found in small agricultural plots and banana plantations.

Many species of bats coexist in the Amazonian lowlands. The lack of proper natural history makes it hard to determine population density and size.

In 2018, it was assessed for the IUCN Red List of Threatened Species as Least Concern.
