= Novo River (Sono River tributary) =

Novo River Rio Novo
- Location within Brazil

Location
- Country: Brazil

Physical characteristics
- Source
  - location: Mateiros, Tocantins
  - coordinates: 10.795094°S 46.330606°W
- Mouth
  - location: Do Sono River
  - coordinates: 10.182454°S 46.935580°W

Basin features
- River system: Do Sono River

The Novo River is a river of Tocantins state, Brazil. It is a headwater of the Do Sono River.

The river forms to the south of the 158,885 hectares (392,610 acres) Jalapão State Park, a fully protected conservation unit created in 2001. It runs north along the west boundary of the park to the point where it meets the Soninho River from the left to form the Do Sono River.

== See also ==
- List of rivers of Tocantins
