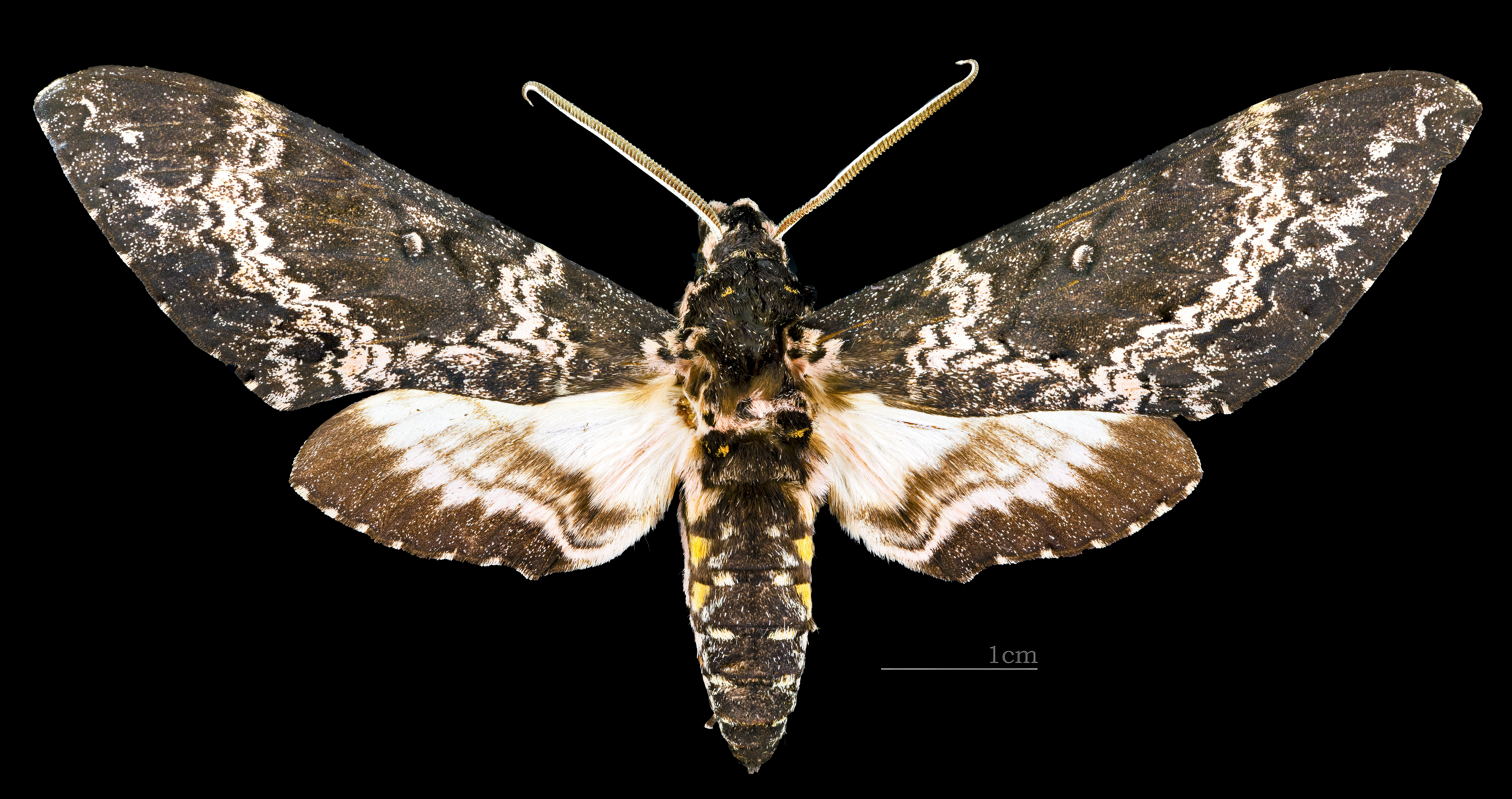
- Male dorsal
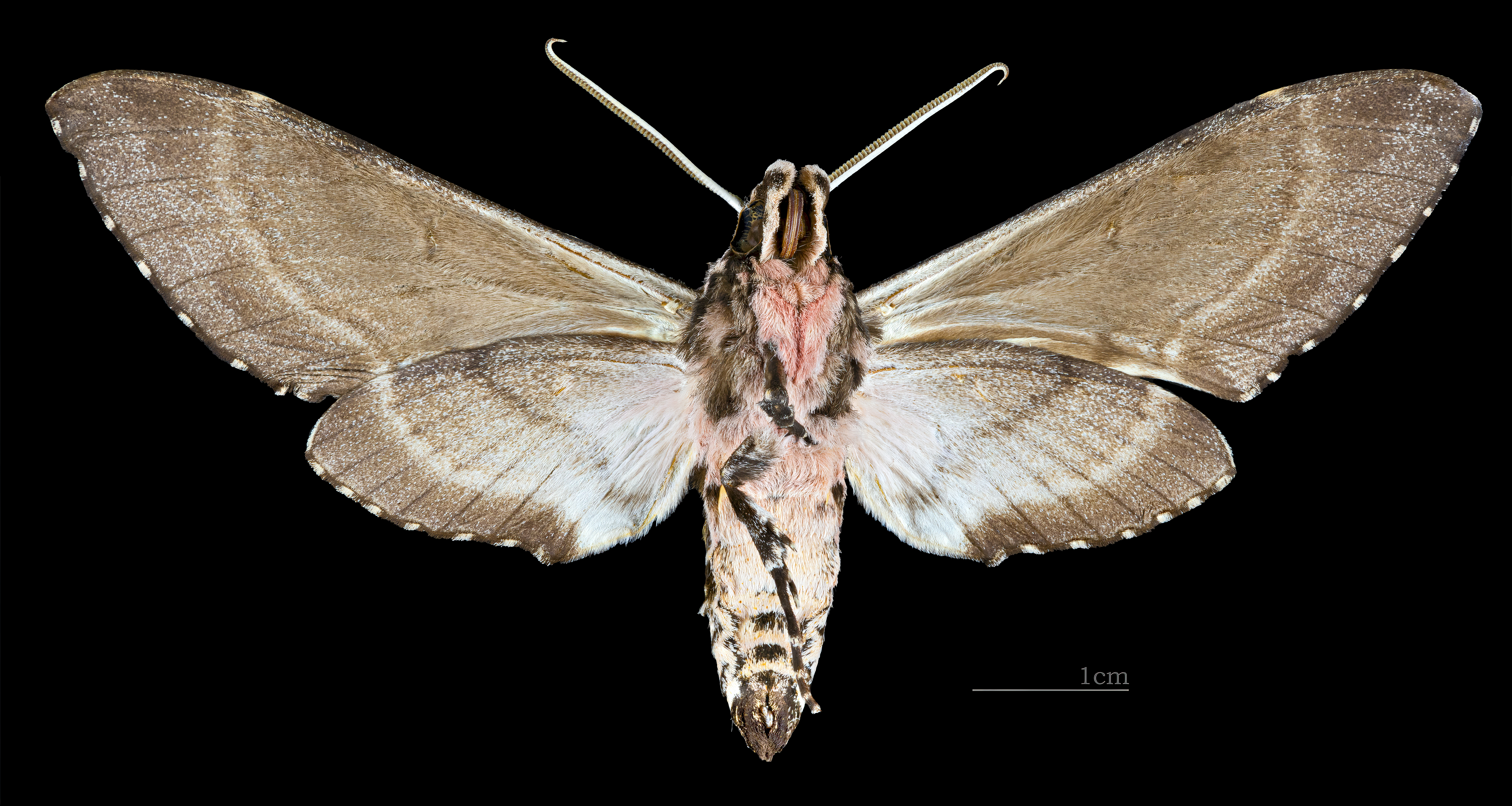
- Male ventral

Scientific classification
- Kingdom: Animalia
- Phylum: Arthropoda
- Class: Insecta
- Order: Lepidoptera
- Family: Sphingidae
- Genus: Manduca
- Species: M. manducoides

Binomial name
- Manduca manducoides (Rothschild, 1895)

Synonyms
- Phlegethontius manducoides Rothschild, 1895; Protoparce breyeri Köhler, 1924

= Manduca manducoides =

Species of moth

Manduca manducoides is a moth of the family Sphingidae.

== Distribution ==
It is known from Bolivia, Argentina, Paraguay and Brazil.

== Description ==
It is can be distinguished from other species in the genus Manduca by the dark forewing upperside with few paler markings, the hindwing upperside with an extensive white basal area and the underside of the thorax and abdomen which are suffused with pink. There are three yellow side patches located on the abdomen. The underside of the wings is greyish brown.

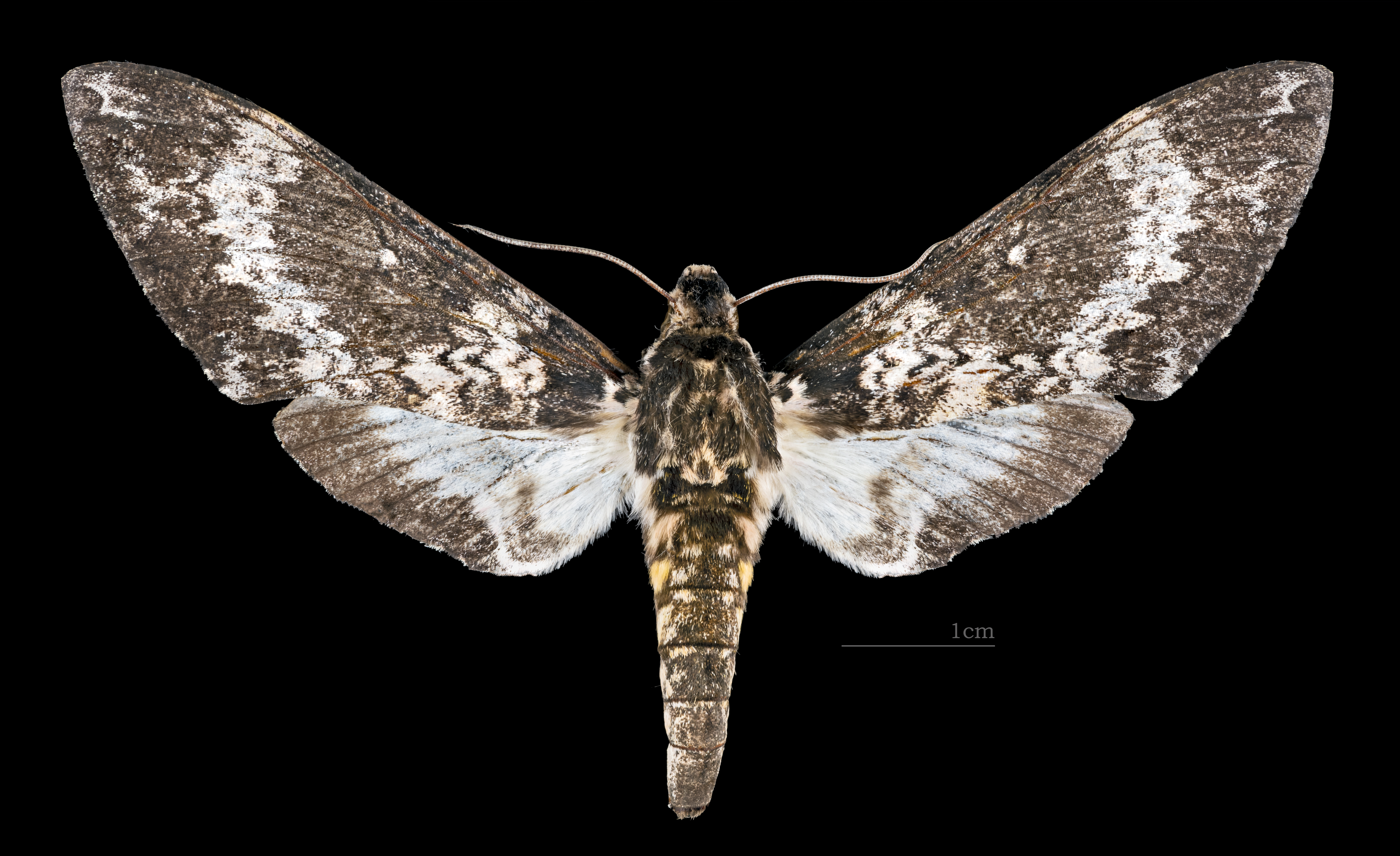
Manduca manducoides ♀

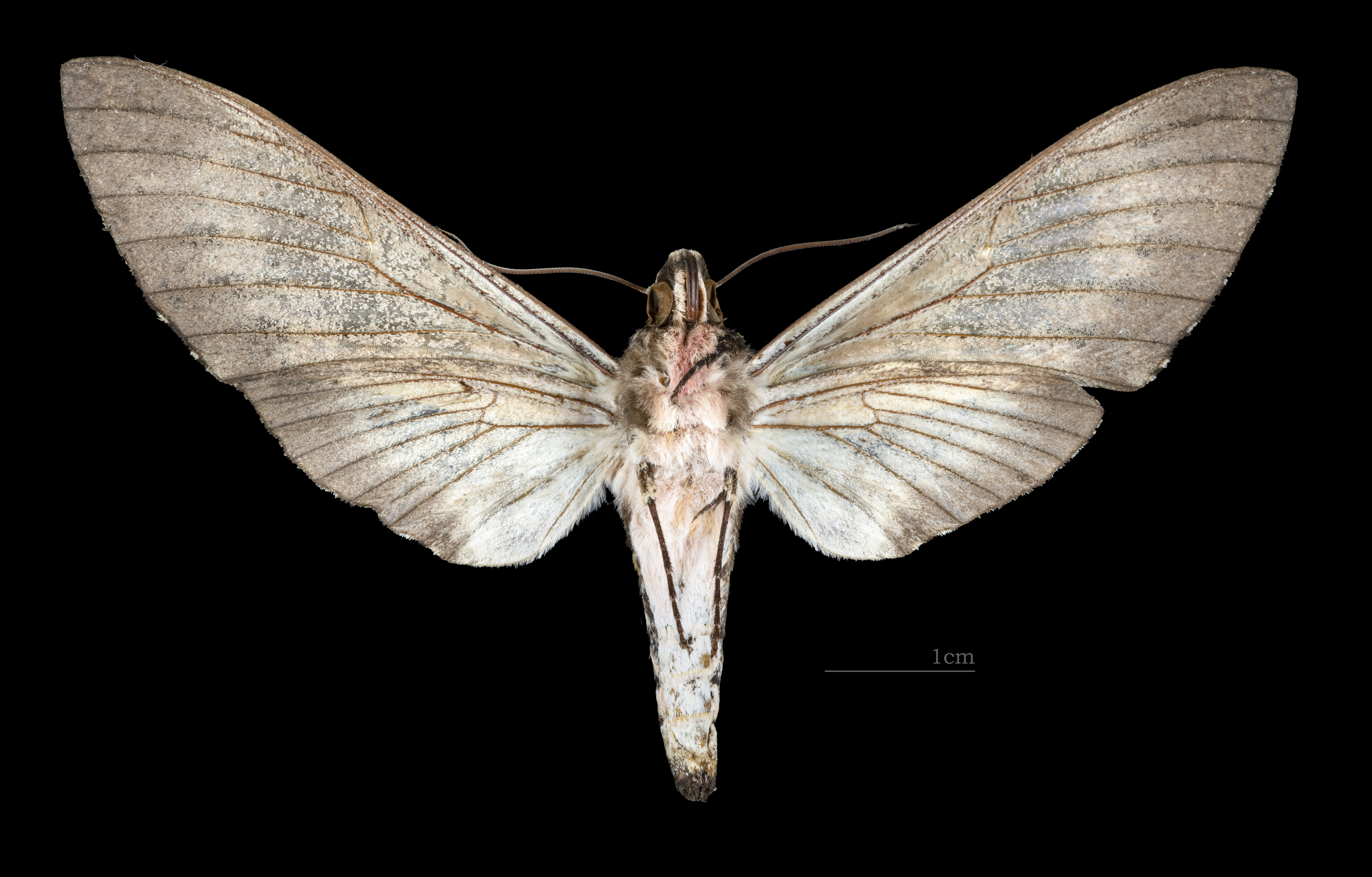
Manduca manducoides ♀ △

== Biology ==
Adults are on wing in August, September, October, November and December, although the peak flight seems to be September to October. There is one generation per year.

The larvae feed on Annona coriacea.
