= Soninho River =

Soninho River Rio Soninho
- Location within Brazil

Location
- Country: Brazil

Physical characteristics
- Source
  - location: Mateiros, Tocantins
  - coordinates: 10.227830°S 46.608604°W
- Mouth
  - location: Do Sono River
  - coordinates: 10.181875°S 46.935478°W

Basin features
- River system: Do Sono River

The Soninho River (Portuguese: Rio Soninho) is a river of Tocantins state, Brazil. It is a headwater of the Do Sono River.

The Soninho river forms on the northeast boundary of the 158,885 hectares (392,610 acres) Jalapão State Park, a fully protected conservation unit created in 2001. It runs west along the north boundary of the park to the point where it meets the Novo River from the right to form the Do Sono River.

== See also ==
- List of rivers of Tocantins
