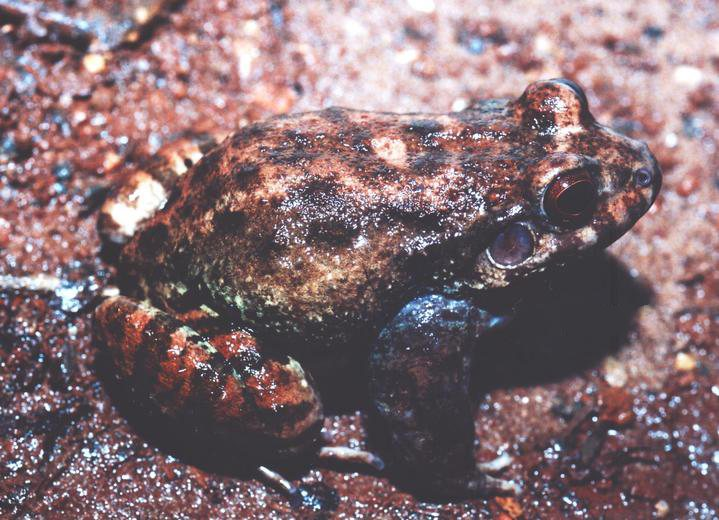
- Leptodactylus syphax at Araguari in Minas Gerais, Brazil.

Conservation status
- Least Concern (IUCN 3.1)

Scientific classification
- Kingdom: Animalia
- Phylum: Chordata
- Class: Amphibia
- Order: Anura
- Family: Leptodactylidae
- Genus: Leptodactylus
- Species: L. syphax

Binomial name
- Leptodactylus syphax Bokermann, 1969

= Leptodactylus syphax =

Species of frog

Leptodactylus syphax is a species of frog in the family Leptodactylidae. It is found in extreme eastern Bolivia, central to northeastern Brazil, and Paraguay. Common names basin white-lipped frog and whistling foam frog have been coined for it.

== Etymology ==
The specific name syphax is Greek meaning "sweet new wine" and alludes to the bright red color seen in the groin, belly, and ventral surfaces of the thighs and shanks in some living specimens.

== Description ==
Adult males measure 58–83 mm (2.3–3.3 in) and adult females 71–90 mm (2.8–3.5 in) in snout–vent length. The tympanum is distinct. Neither dorsal folds nor dorsolateral folds are present; lateral folds are also absent or are largely interrupted. Most specimens have a glandular dorsum with muted, tile-like dorsal pattern of darker and lighter browns. Light upper lip stripe is not present. The belly has light to moderate mottling and light gray or brown markings.

The tadpoles grow to 44 mm (1.7 in) in total length (Gosner stage 41).

== Habitat and conservation ==
Leptodactylus syphax occurs in open areas, often rocky outcrops, in rock or termite cavities. It reproduces in temporary and permanent pools of water. The tadpoles develop in standing bodies of water, such as quiet side pools of streams. This species can be common in ideal habitat situations but not otherwise. Overgrazing, agricultural intensification, and fire might be local threats. Scientists have observed the frog between 600 and 2000 meters above sea level. Its range contains several protected areas, including APA Pouso Alto, APA Serra da Ibiapaba, ESEC Serra Geral do Tocantins, and FLONA de Carajas.
