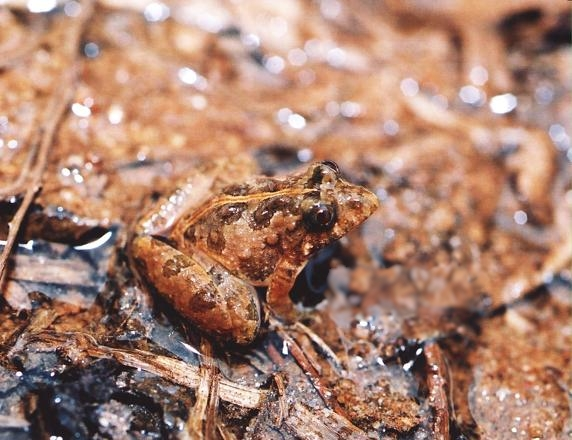

Conservation status
- Least Concern (IUCN 3.1)

Scientific classification
- Kingdom: Animalia
- Phylum: Chordata
- Class: Amphibia
- Order: Anura
- Family: Leptodactylidae
- Genus: Pseudopaludicola
- Species: P. saltica

Binomial name
- Pseudopaludicola saltica (Cope, 1887)

Synonyms
- Paludicola saltica Cope, 1887

= Pseudopaludicola saltica =

Species of frog

Pseudopaludicola saltica, also known as the Chupada swamp frog or long-legged swamp froglet , is a species of frog in the family Leptodactylidae. It is endemic to south-central Brazil (Mato Grosso, Minas Gerais, and São Paulo states, as well as the Federal District).

Pseudopaludicola saltica is a common species of Cerrado savanna between 600 and 1,200 m (2,000 and 3,900 ft) above sea level. It occurs in moist fields and pastures, adapting well to anthropogenic disturbance. Breeding takes place in pools and swamps.

Scientists have reported these frogs in protected places: Área de Proteção Ambiental da Chapada dos Guimarães, Estação Ecológica Serra Geral do Tocantins, Parque Estadual do Jalapão, and Parque Nacional da Chapada dos Veadeiros.

The IUCN classifies this species as least concern of extinction, though local populations can be threatened by habitat loss caused by intensive agriculture, fire, and dam construction.
