= De Vivo's disk-winged bat =

Conservation status
- Data Deficient (IUCN 3.1)

Scientific classification
- Kingdom: Animalia
- Phylum: Chordata
- Class: Mammalia
- Order: Chiroptera
- Family: Thyropteridae
- Genus: Thyroptera
- Species: T. devivoi

Binomial name
- Thyroptera devivoi Gregorin, Gonçalves, Lim & Engstrom, 2006

Species of bat

De Vivo's disk-winged bat (Thyroptera devivoi) is a species of disc-winged bat found in South America.

== Taxonomy and etymology ==
It was described as a new species in 2006, the fourth species to be described in the disc-winged bat genus and family. The holotype used to describe the species was collected in 2000 near Serra Geral do Tocantins Ecological Station in Brazil. It is possible that the currently-described species is a species complex that may face further taxonomic revision; it could undergo a taxonomic split with the description of a second species. The eponym for the species name "devivoi" is Mario de Vivo; the authors of the 2006 paper chose to honor him with the species name because he "has been responsible for a considerable increase in the understanding of both mammal diversity and systematics in Brazil."

== Description ==
The bat's head and body length is 38.4–46.0 mm (1.51–1.81 in). It has a forearm length of 36–38 mm (1.4–1.5 in) and a tail 24.6–29.0 mm (0.97–1.14 in) long. Its fur is cinnamon brown, with the ventral fur appearing frosted.

== Range and habitat ==
It is known from two countries in South America: Guyana and Brazil. It is known from the Cerrado of Brazil and other savanna ecosystems. In 2015, the species was recorded in Colombia for the first time.

== Conservation ==
It is currently evaluated as data deficient by the IUCN. It is a recently described species, and little is known about its range, population size and trend, ecology, or threats. As of 2015, it was only known from four specimens.
