= São Félix do Tocantins =

Municipality in Tocantins, Brazil

Coordinates: 10°11′S 46°33′W

- Municipality
- Location in Tocantins
- Country: Brazil
- Region: Northern
- State: Tocantins
- Mesoregion: Oriental do Tocantins

Population (2020)
  - Total: 1,598
- Time zone: UTC−3 (BRT)

São Félix do Tocantins is a municipality in the state of Tocantins in the Northern region of Brazil.

The municipality is in the microregion of Jalapão. It contains part of the 724,324-hectare (1,789,840-acre) Nascentes do Rio Parnaíba National Park, created in 2002.

== See also ==
- List of municipalities in Tocantins
