= Jalapão State Park =

State park in Tocantins, Brazil

- Parque Estadual do Jalapão
- IUCN category II (national park)
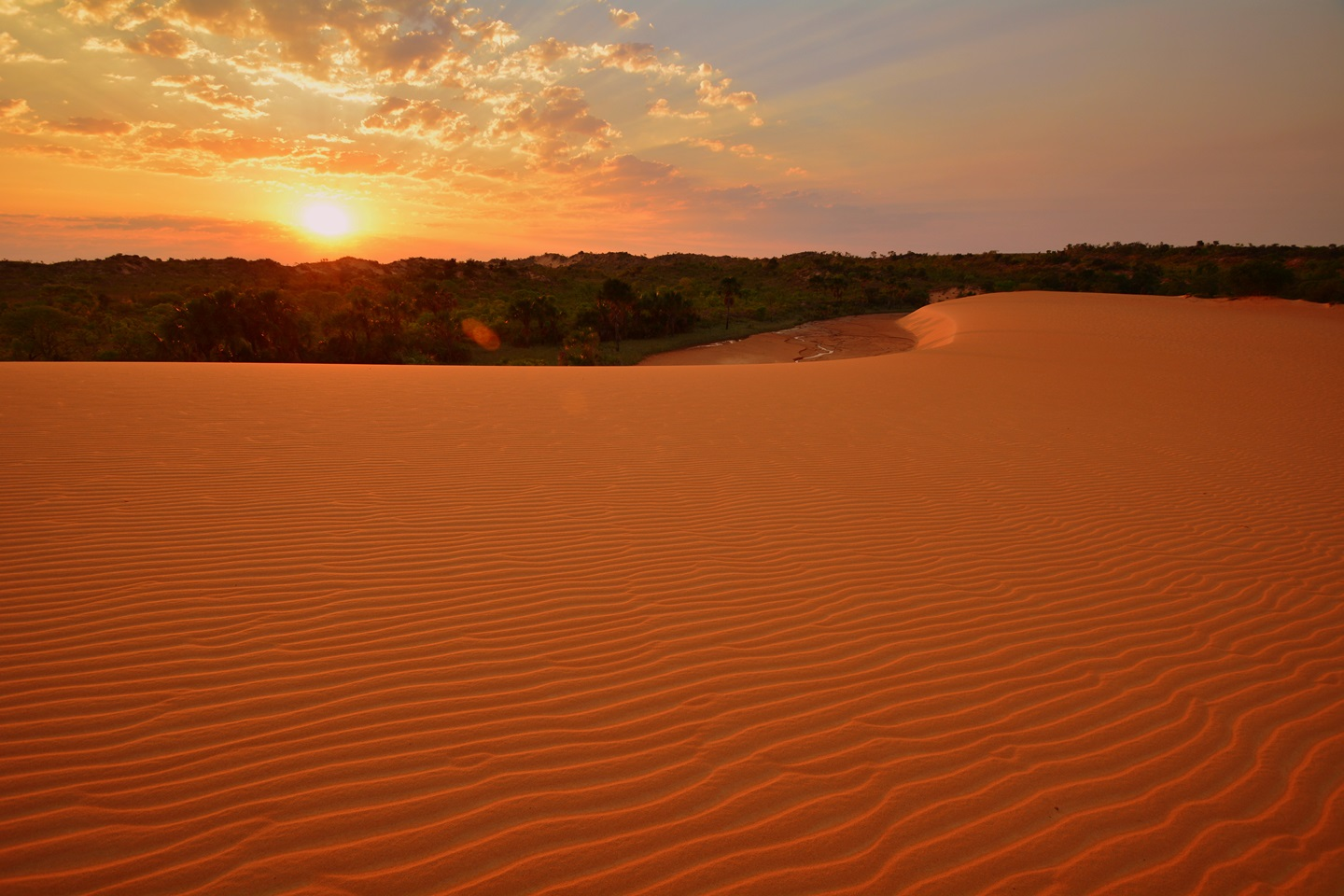
- Dunes and Serra do Espírito Santo

- Location within Brazil
- Nearest city: Mateiros, Tocantins
- Coordinates: 10.359°S 46.699°W
- Area: 158,885 hectares (392,610 acres)
- Designation: State park
- Created: 12 January 2001
- Administrator: Instituto Natureza do Tocantins

Jalapão State Park (Portuguese: Parque Estadual do Jalapão) is a state park in the microregion of Jalapão in eastern Tocantins, Brazil. It contains a variety of landscapes including cerrado vegetation, sand dunes and flat-topped plateaus.

== Location ==
The Jalapão State Park lies in the municipality of Mateiros, Tocantins, and has an area of 158,885 hectares (392,610 acres). The park covers the Espírito Santo dunes and mountains. It is relatively inaccessible, requiring a drive of about 600 kilometres (370 mi) over dirt roads. It contains flat-topped plateaus bounded by steep cliffs, constantly subject to erosion by rain and wind. Most of the park is in the upper basin of the Do Sono River, including the Novo, Soninho and Do Sono rivers. This in turn is part of the Araguaia - Tocantins basin.

== Environment ==
The park contains dry and wet grassland, campo sujo, strict cerrado, sparse dune vegetation, cerradão, gallery forest, riparian forest and semi-deciduous lacustrine vegetation. Rare species include Annona coriacea, Attalea eichleri, Chamaecrista oligosperma, Ditassa acerosa, Guettarda vibournoidese and Xylopia aromatica. Economically useful plants include Syngonanthus nitens, Mauritia flexuosa, Anacardium occidentale, Anadenanthera colubrina, Annona coriacea, Astronium fraxinifolium, Brosimum gaudichaudii, Dalbergia miscolobium, Eugenia dysenterica, Hancornia speciosa, Pterodon pubescens and Stryphnodendron adstringens. The Acosmium subelegans, Andira cordata and Parkia platycephala are endemic.

The hoary fox (Lycalopex vetulus) is endemic. The rare and endangered Brazilian merganser (Mergus octosetaceus) and Chaco eagle (Buteogallus coronatus) are found in the park.

== Administration ==
The Jalapão State Park was created by state Law 1203 of 12 January 2001. The park is part of the Jalapão ecological corridor, The Serra Geral do Tocantins Ecological Station, one of the core areas of the Cerrado Biosphere Reserve, is also part of this corridor. On 21 July 2009 a technical cooperative agreement was signed between the Chico Mendes Institute for Biodiversity Conservation (ICMBio) and the Nature Institute of Tocantins for management and conservation of the Serra Geral do Tocantins Ecological Station and the Jalapão State Park. The state park's advisory board was appointed on 15 December 2011.

== Sources ==
- "Estação Ecológica Serra Geral do Tocantins", Ambiente Brasil (in Portuguese)
- Miguel Bernardino dos Santos (July 2005), PLANO OPERATIVO DE PREVENÇÃO E COMBATE AOS INCÊNDIOS FLORESTAIS NA ESTAÇÃO ECOLÓGICA DE SERRA GERAL DO TOCANTINS (REGIÃO DO JALAPÃO) (in Portuguese), Palmas - TO: Ministério do Meio Ambiente, archived from the original on 2016-06-24
- PES do Jalapão (in Portuguese), ISA: Instituto Socioambiental
