= Lagoa do Tocantins =

Municipality in Tocantins, Brazil

Coordinates: 10°23′S 47°25′W

- Municipality
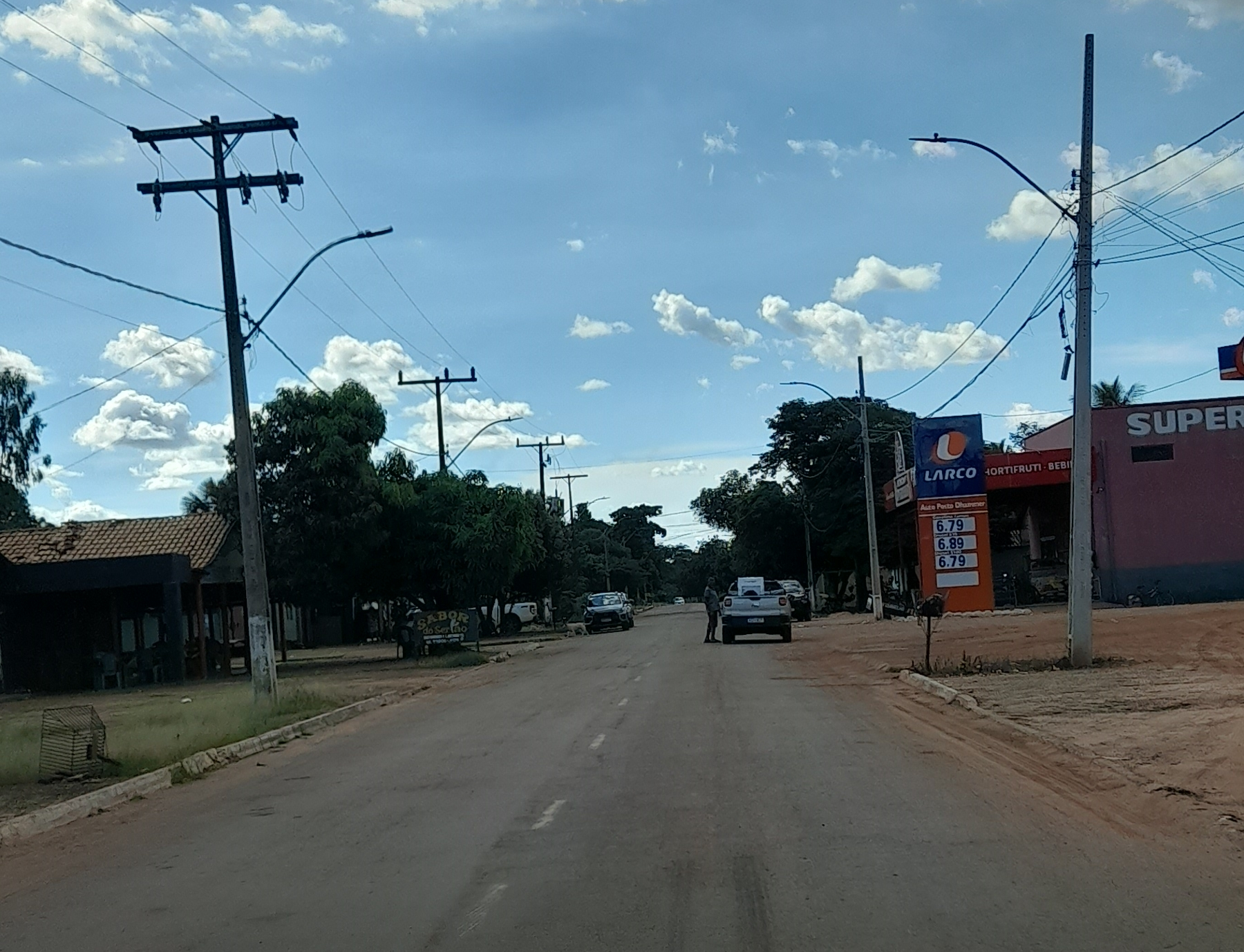
- A view of the center of the city in May 2025

- Location in Tocantins
- Country: Brazil
- Region: Northern
- State: Tocantins
- Mesoregion: Oriental do Tocantins

Population (2020)
  - Total: 4,393
- Time zone: UTC−3 (BRT)

Lagoa do Tocantins is a municipality in the state of Tocantins in the Northern region of Brazil.

The municipality is in the microregion of Jalapão.

== See also ==
- List of municipalities in Tocantins
