= Almas, Tocantins =

Municipality in Tocantins, Brazil

Almas
- Municipality
- Location in Tocantins state

- Location in Brazil
- Coordinates: 11°34′26″S 47°10′12″W
- Country: Brazil
- Region: North
- State: Tocantins

Area
  - Total: 4,013 km^{2} (1,549 sq mi)

Population (2020)
  - Total: 6,979
  - Density: 1.739/km^{2} (4.504/sq mi)
- Time zone: UTC−3 (BRT)

Almas is a municipality located in the Brazilian state of Tocantins. Its population was 6,979 (2020) and its area is 4,013 km^{2}.

The municipality contains part of the 707,079-hectare (1,747,230-acre) Serra Geral do Tocantins Ecological Station, a strictly protected conservation unit created in 2001 to preserve an area of cerrado.

== See also ==
- List of municipalities in Tocantins
