= Ponte Alta do Tocantins =

Municipality in Tocantins, Brazil

Coordinates: 10°46′S 47°24′W

- Municipality
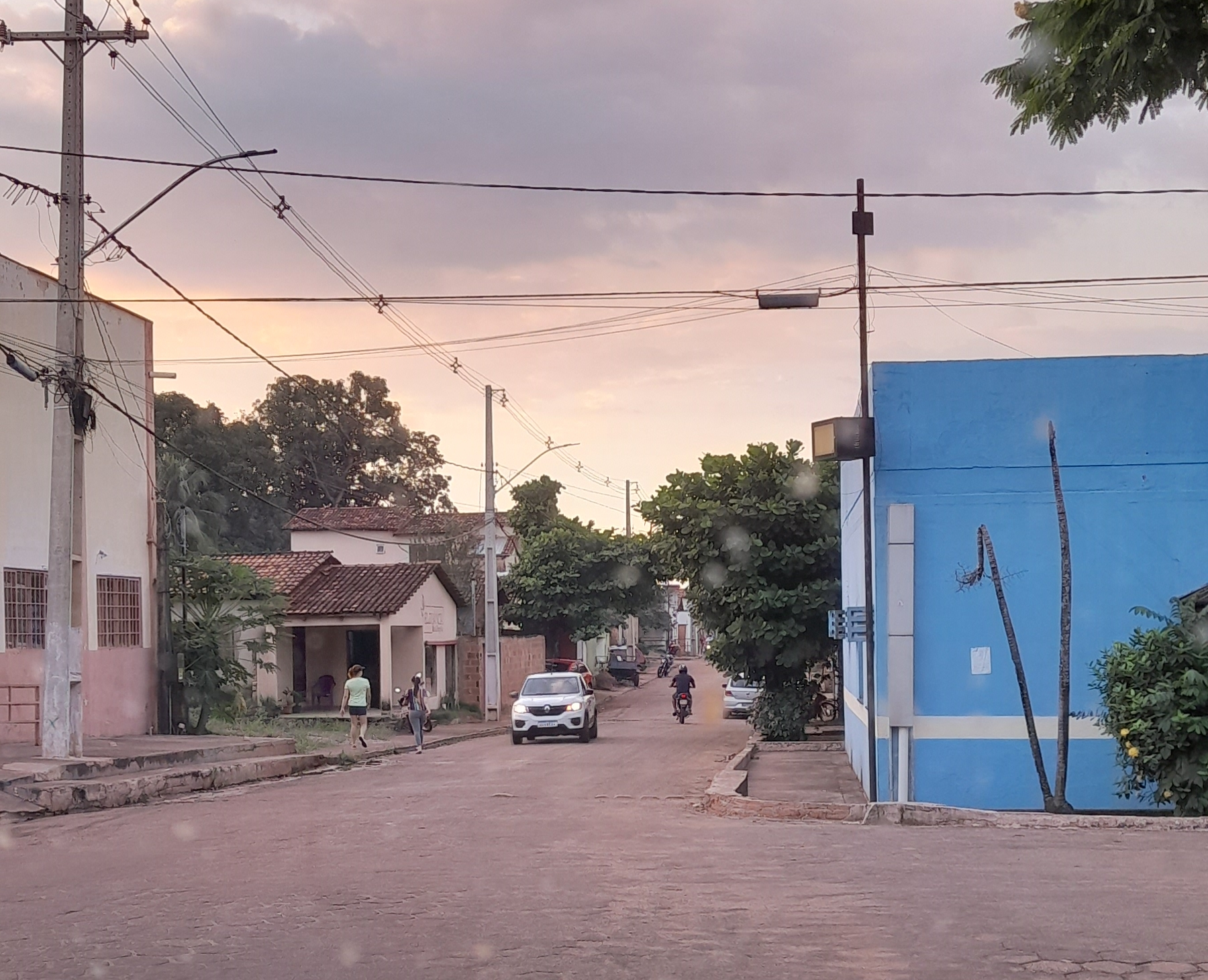
- A street in the center of the city in May 2025.

- Location in Tocantins
- Country: Brazil
- Region: Northern
- State: Tocantins
- Mesoregion: Oriental do Tocantins

Population (2020)
  - Total: 8,116
- Time zone: UTC−3 (BRT)

Ponte Alta do Tocantins is a municipality in the state of Tocantins in the Northern region of Brazil.

The municipality is in the microregion of Jalapão. The municipality contains part of the 707,079-hectare (1,747,230-acre) Serra Geral do Tocantins Ecological Station, a strictly protected conservation unit created in 2001 to preserve an area of cerrado.

== See also ==
- List of municipalities in Tocantins
