= LaVal's disk-winged bat =

Conservation status
- Data Deficient (IUCN 3.1)

Scientific classification
- Kingdom: Animalia
- Phylum: Chordata
- Class: Mammalia
- Order: Chiroptera
- Family: Thyropteridae
- Genus: Thyroptera
- Species: T. lavali

Binomial name
- Thyroptera lavali Pine, 1993

Species of bat

LaVal's disk-winged bat (Thyroptera lavali) is a species of bat in the family Thyropteridae. It is native to Ecuador, Colombia, Peru, Venezuela, and Brazil where it has been found near streams in tropical rainforest. The bat is insectivorous. It is poorly studied but is believed to be rare. The species was named in honor of American zoologist Richard K. LaVal.
