= Alto Parnaíba =

- municipality
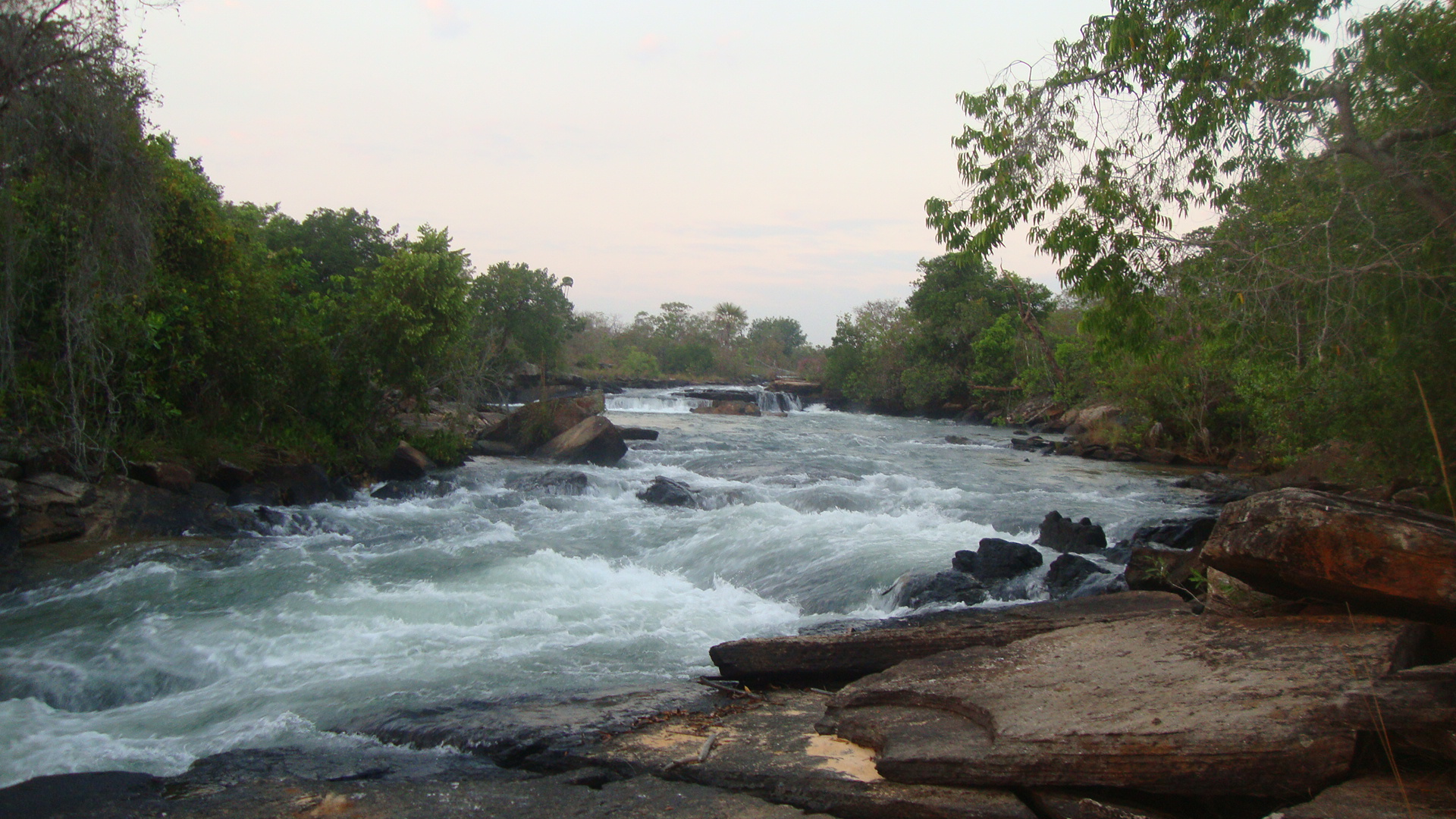
- Cachoeira das Tabocas

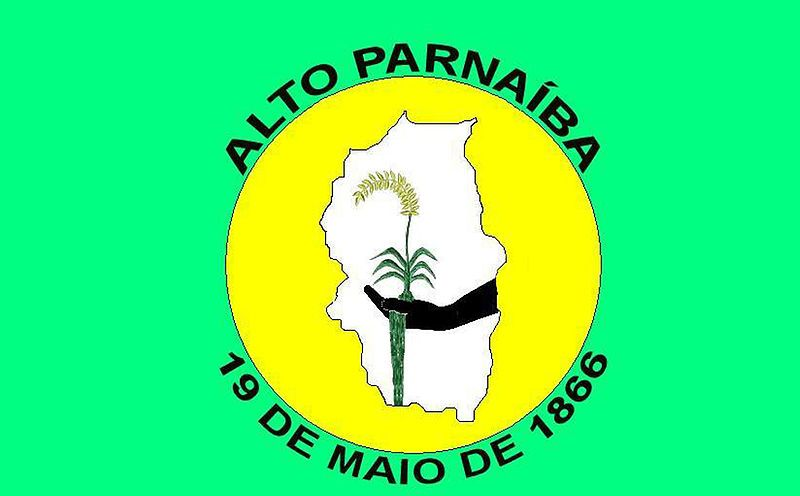
- Flag

- Location of Alto Parnaíba
- Coordinates: 09°06′39″S 45°55′48″W
- Country: Brazil
- Region: Northeast
- State: Maranhão
- Founded: May 19, 1866

Government
  - Mayor: Ranieri Avelino Soares

Area
  - Total: 11,132.105 km^{2} (4,298.130 sq mi)

Population (2020)
  - Total: 11,212
  - Density: 0.9/km^{2} (2.3/sq mi)
- Time zone: UTC−3 (BRT)
- HDI (2000): 0.636 – medium

Alto Parnaíba is a Brazilian municipality in the southernmost tip of the state of Maranhão. In 2020, the city's population was 11,212.

The municipality contains part of the 724,324 hectares (1,789,840 acres) Nascentes do Rio Parnaíba National Park, created in 2002.

== Climate ==
Alto Parnaíba experiences a tropical savanna climate (Köppen: Aw) with hot temperatures and distinct wet and dry seasons.

The city experiences a wet season from November to April. The dry season extends from May to September, with June through August having almost no rainfall.

Alto Parnaíba has hot and humid conditions throughout the year. September and October, before the wet season, are the hottest months, with average highs around 36 °C (97 °F).

Climate data for Alto Parnaíba (1991–2020)
Month	Jan	Feb	Mar	Apr	May	Jun	Jul	Aug	Sep	Oct	Nov	Dec	Year
Mean daily maximum °C (°F)	32.0 (89.6)	32.0 (89.6)	32.2 (90.0)	32.7 (90.9)	33.2 (91.8)	33.3 (91.9)	33.8 (92.8)	35.3 (95.5)	36.7 (98.1)	35.8 (96.4)	33.5 (92.3)	32.4 (90.3)	33.6 (92.5)
Daily mean °C (°F)	26.0 (78.8)	25.9 (78.6)	26.1 (79.0)	26.3 (79.3)	26.1 (79.0)	25.0 (77.0)	24.7 (76.5)	25.8 (78.4)	27.9 (82.2)	28.3 (82.9)	27.1 (80.8)	26.4 (79.5)	26.3 (79.3)
Mean daily minimum °C (°F)	21.9 (71.4)	21.9 (71.4)	22.0 (71.6)	21.8 (71.2)	20.7 (69.3)	18.2 (64.8)	17.0 (62.6)	17.5 (63.5)	20.2 (68.4)	22.3 (72.1)	22.4 (72.3)	22.1 (71.8)	20.7 (69.3)
Average precipitation mm (inches)	231.0 (9.09)	195.7 (7.70)	241.6 (9.51)	128.4 (5.06)	39.6 (1.56)	2.5 (0.10)	0.4 (0.02)	2.0 (0.08)	14.1 (0.56)	74.8 (2.94)	163.8 (6.45)	186.3 (7.33)	1,280.2 (50.40)
Average precipitation days (≥ 1.0 mm)	16.3	15.4	15.9	10.9	4.0	0.4	0.1	0.3	1.8	6.7	11.5	13.5	96.8
Average relative humidity (%)	81.0	82.2	82.5	79.5	74.2	68.3	63.4	58.3	56.7	64.4	75.2	78.6	72.0
Average dew point °C (°F)	22.8 (73.0)	22.9 (73.2)	23.1 (73.6)	22.9 (73.2)	21.9 (71.4)	19.9 (67.8)	18.4 (65.1)	18.1 (64.6)	19.2 (66.6)	21.2 (70.2)	22.5 (72.5)	22.7 (72.9)	21.3 (70.3)
Mean monthly sunshine hours	165.4	142.5	165.7	189.4	240.5	274.8	298.2	288.6	252.9	222.2	173.8	163.0	2,577
Source: NOAA
