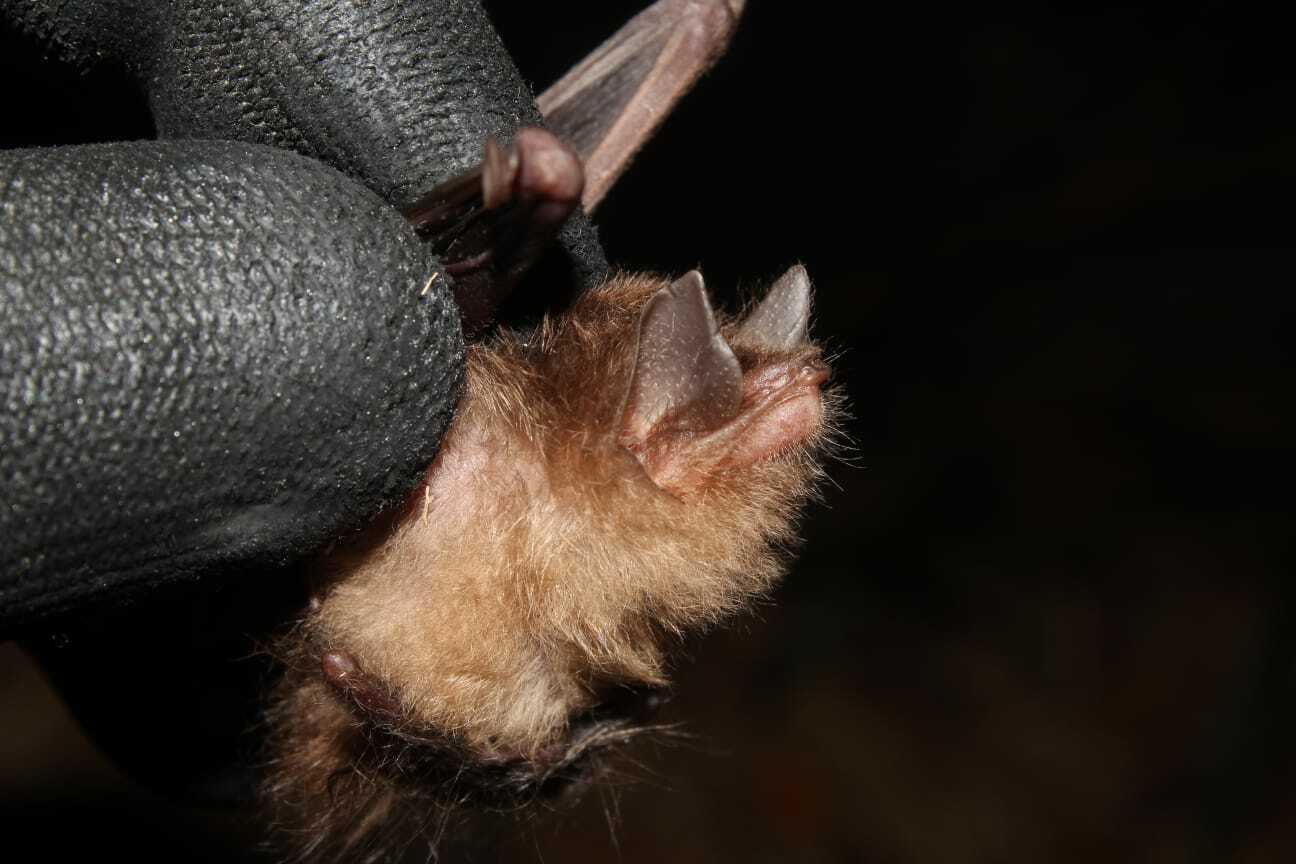

Conservation status
- Data Deficient (IUCN 3.1)

Scientific classification
- Kingdom: Animalia
- Phylum: Chordata
- Class: Mammalia
- Order: Chiroptera
- Family: Thyropteridae
- Genus: Thyroptera
- Species: T. wynneae

Binomial name
- Thyroptera wynneae Velazco, Gregorin, Voss & Simmons, 2014
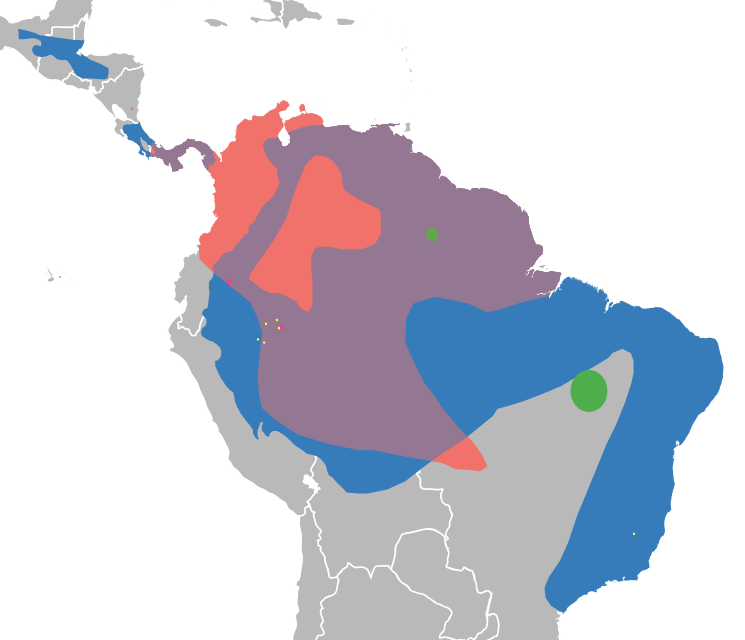
- Thyroptera distribution T. wynneae in yellow

= Patricia's disk-winged bat =

Species of bat

Patricia's disk-winged bat (Thyroptera wynneae) is a species of disk-winged bat found in South America.

== Taxonomy and etymology ==
It was described as a new species in 2014. The holotype was collected in 2012 in Peru. The eponym for the species name "wynneae" is Patricia J. Wynne, an artist-in-residence for the American Museum of Natural History's Department of Mammalogy. Of Wynne, the authors wrote, "Exceptional for clarity, elegant rendering, and meticulous attention to relevant detail, Patricia's work is immediately recognizable and inimitable."

== Description ==
Patricia's disk-winged bat has a short and narrow snout, and its braincase is globular. Its fur is light brown, long, and woolly and the flight membranes are dark brown. It has oblong adhesive disks on its thumbs and feet. It has a dental formula of 2.1.3.33.1.3.3 for a total of 38 teeth.

It inhabits lowland areas from 55–300 m (180–984 ft) in Peru and Brazil. As of 2016, it was evaluated as data deficient by the IUCN.
