= Lizarda =

Municipality in Tocantins, Brazil

Coordinates: 9°38′S 46°32′W

- Municipality
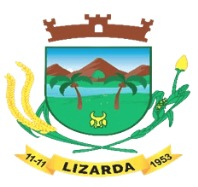
- Coat of arms

- Location in Tocantins
- Country: Brazil
- Region: Northern
- State: Tocantins
- Mesoregion: Oriental do Tocantins

Population (2020)
  - Total: 3,733
- Time zone: UTC−3 (BRT)

Lizarda is a municipality in the state of Tocantins in the Northern region of Brazil.

The municipality is in the Jalapão microregion. It contains part of the 724,324-hectare (1,789,840-acre) Nascentes do Rio Parnaíba National Park, created in 2002.

== See also ==
- List of municipalities in Tocantins
