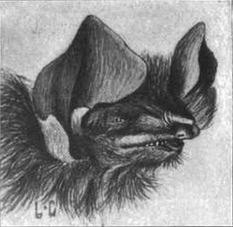
- Drawing of Peters's disk-winged bat

Scientific classification
- Kingdom: Animalia
- Phylum: Chordata
- Class: Mammalia
- Order: Chiroptera
- Superfamily: Noctilionoidea
- Family: Thyropteridae; Miller 1907
- Genus: Thyroptera; Spix 1823

Type species
- Thyroptera tricolor Spix, 1823

Species
- Thyroptera devivoi; Thyroptera discifera; Thyroptera lavali; Thyroptera tricolor; Thyroptera wynneae; †Thyroptera robusta
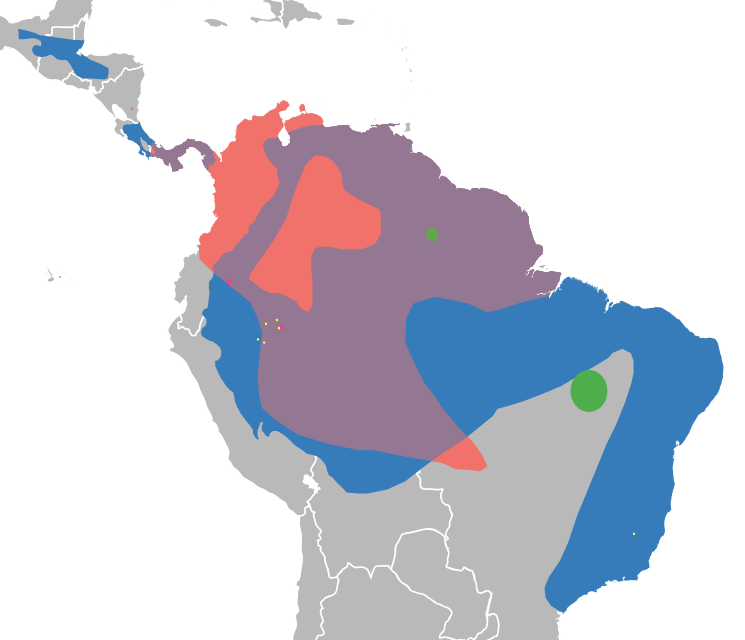
- Thyroptera distribution T. discifera in red, T. tricolor in blue (purple where overlapping with T. discifera), T. lavali in pink, T. devivoi in green, T. wynneae in yellow

Synonyms
- Hyonycteris Lichtenstein & Peters 1854

= Thyroptera =

Disc-winged bats

Genus of bats

Disk-winged bats are a small group of bats of the family Thyropteridae and genus Thyroptera. They are found in Central and South America, usually in moist tropical rain forests. It is a very small family, consisting of a single genus with five extant and one fossil species.

The name comes from the suction cups found at the base of the thumb and under the heel of these animals, similar to those found in sucker-footed bats. These structures help them to cling smooth surfaces, and to remain, for example, inside young coiled banana, Heliconia, and prayer plant leaves, where they roost.

They can also be recognized by their reduced thumbs, which are enclosed by the wing membranes, and their funnel-shaped ears. They have brownish to black fur, and roost in small groups, or singly. They are insectivorous and can live in many different kinds of environments.

== Taxonomy ==
Family Thyropteridae

- Genus Thyroptera
  - De Vivo's disk-winged bat, Thyroptera devivoi
  - Peters's disk-winged bat, Thyroptera discifera
  - LaVal's disk-winged bat, Thyroptera lavali
  - Spix's disk-winged bat, Thyroptera tricolor
  - Patricia's disk-winged bat, Thyroptera wynneae
  - †Thyroptera robusta, Middle Miocene (Laventan) Honda Group, Colombia
