= Do Sono River (Tocantins) =

Do Sono River Rio do Sono
- Location within Brazil

Location
- Country: Brazil

Physical characteristics
- Source
  - location: Tocantins state
  - coordinates: 10.182131°S 46.936068°W
- Mouth
  - location: Tocantins River, Pedro Afonso, Tocantins
  - coordinates: 8.959754°S 48.175988°W

Basin features
- Tributaries
  - left: Novo River
  - right: Soninho River

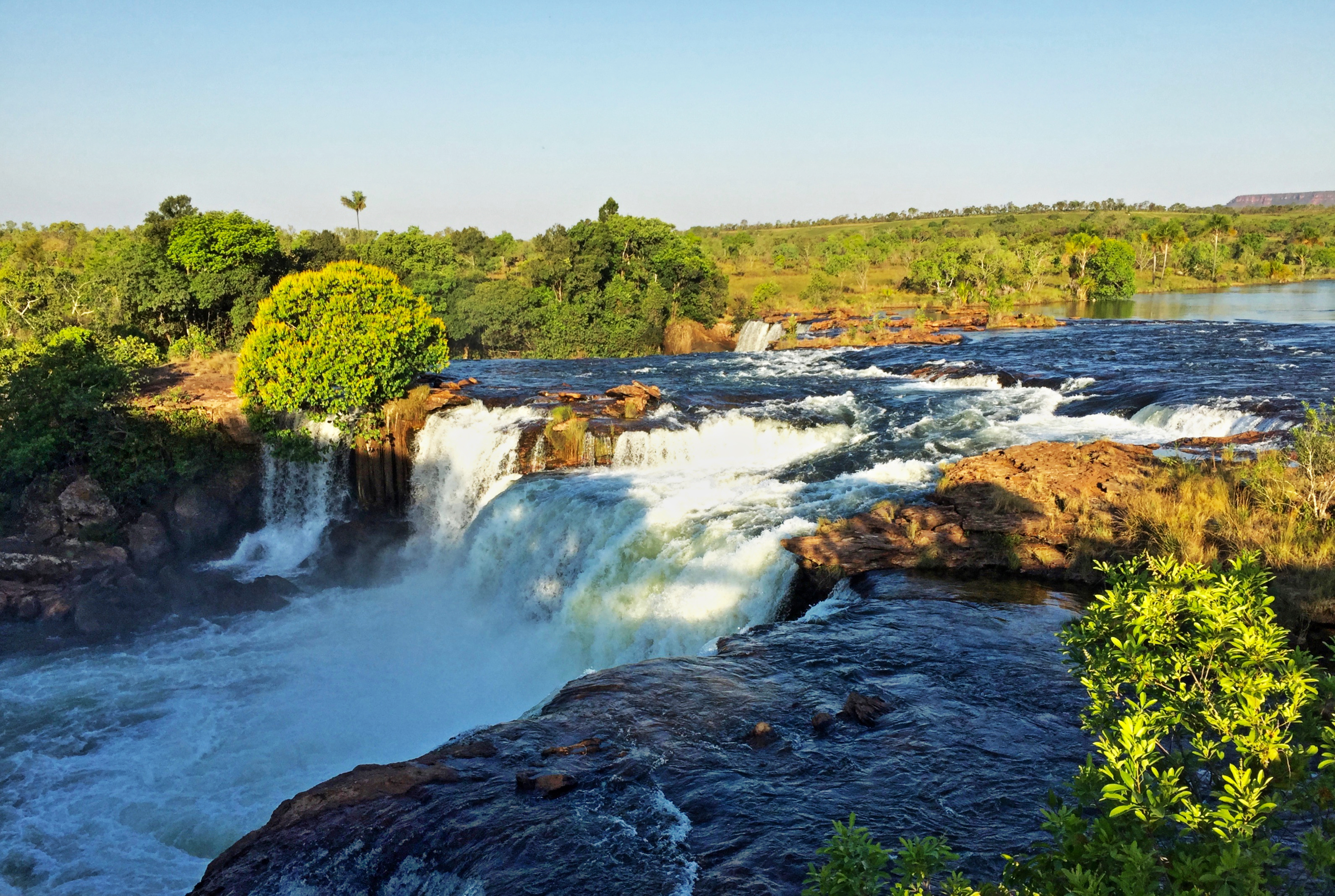
Do Sono river

The Do Sono River (Portuguese: Rio do Sono) is a river of Tocantins state in central Brazil. It is a right tributary of the Tocantins River.

The river has its headwater in the 158,885 hectares (392,610 acres) Jalapão State Park, a fully protected conservation unit created in 2001. The Do Sono forms at the confluence of the Novo and Soninho on the northwest boundary of the state park.

== See also ==
- List of rivers of Tocantins
