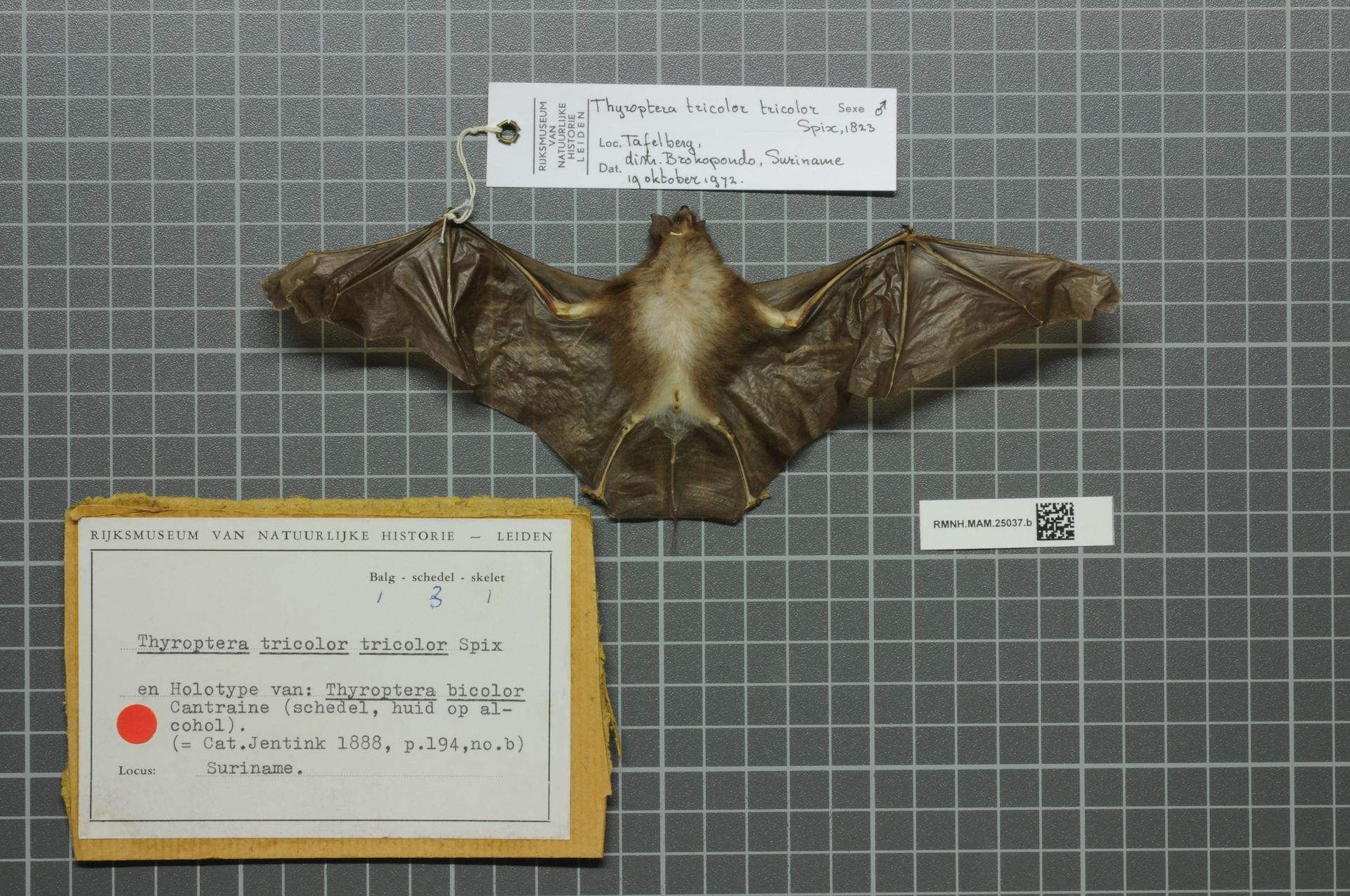

Conservation status
- Least Concern (IUCN 3.1)

Scientific classification
- Kingdom: Animalia
- Phylum: Chordata
- Class: Mammalia
- Order: Chiroptera
- Family: Thyropteridae
- Genus: Thyroptera
- Species: T. tricolor

Binomial name
- Thyroptera tricolor Spix, 1823

= Spix's disk-winged bat =

Species of bat

Spix's disk-winged bat (Thyroptera tricolor), is a species of bat in the family Thyropteridae. It is native to the Americas from Mexico to Brazil. The most prominent anatomical feature of this bat, which distinguishes it from other species, is the disks on its thumbs and hind feet. These circular disks act as suction cups, allowing the bats to cling onto and move along smooth surfaces.

== Distribution and habitat ==
Spix's disk-winged bat is distributed in the nations of Venezuela, Tobago, Trinidad, Suriname, Peru, Panama, Mexico, Guyana, Guatemala, Honduras, French Guiana, Costa Rica, Ecuador, Colombia, Brazil, Belize, and Bolivia. It has a patchy distribution but a very wide range, and it is considered to be a least-concern species by the International Union for Conservation of Nature (IUCN).

Species abundance of the bat may be limited by the availability of roosting sites. Whereas other species of bats are capable of aggregating in large numbers, hanging head-down by their toes from cave ceilings and hollow trees, T. tricolor is adapted to roosting in furled leaves, and its populations may be limited by the abundance of plants with this feature.

== Description ==
Spix's disk-winged bat has a white or pale yellow underbelly and a reddish-brown to black dorsal surface. In a survey of this species individuals had an average forearm length of 37 millimetres (1.5 in) and 36 millimetres (1.4 in) for females and males, respectively. The adult weighs about 4 grams (0.14 oz).

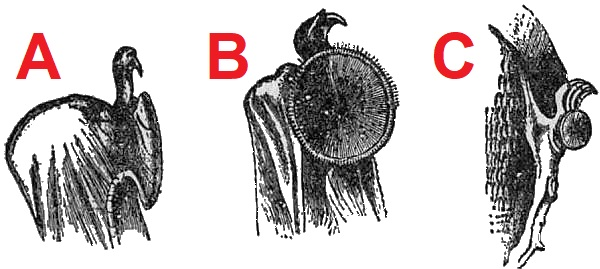
Illustration of the disks

Unlike most bats, T. tricolor clings head-up from its roost. This phenomenon is observed in six bat species in two genera, Thyroptera and Myzopoda. The former are known as disk-winged, and the latter as sucker-footed. The two groups represent an occurrence of the parallel evolution of a feature, but the two forms of adhesive anatomy are utilized differently.

The disk-winged bat seeks a bud of rolled-up leaves with the opening at the top. It clings head-up to the smooth inner (ventral) surfaces of the leaves. Plants with this leaf morphology include Heliconia and Calathea species. This manner of roosting is said to facilitate rapid escape in the event of a potential disturbance. The bat's disks take the shape of concave cups, and are supported by an internal cartilaginous plate. The flexor pollicis brevis muscle attaches to the plate, such that contraction of the muscle alters overall disk shape, creating suction. In order to maintain the integrity of the disk the bat grooms it frequently by licking it. The disk also contains abundant sweat glands, maintaining a moist surface.

The Madagascar sucker-footed bat (Myzopoda aurita) has similar sucker anatomy, but produces suction differently. It uses its flexor muscle to change the shape of the disk when detaching from a surface. It also uses sweat lubrication to produce wet adhesion as the main mechanism, rather than suction. It can only attach head-up, while the disk-winged bat can cling at any angle. M. aurita can concurrently make contact with both its adhesive organ and thumb claw, whereas T. tricolor cannot. This may be due to the difference in the anatomy of the muscle insertions and the actions they bring about.

== Behavior ==
The species roosts communally. The mean colony size is six individuals and colonies have a sex ratio of 1:1. The disks do not prevent agile flight, and bats may circle furled leaves they seek to enter. They fly just a few meters above the forest floor. The species is insectivorous, with adults consuming up to 0.8 grams (0.03 oz) of insects per night.
