= Nascentes do Rio Parnaíba National Park =

National Park of Brazil

- Parque Nacional das Nascentes do Rio Parnaíba
- IUCN category II (national park)
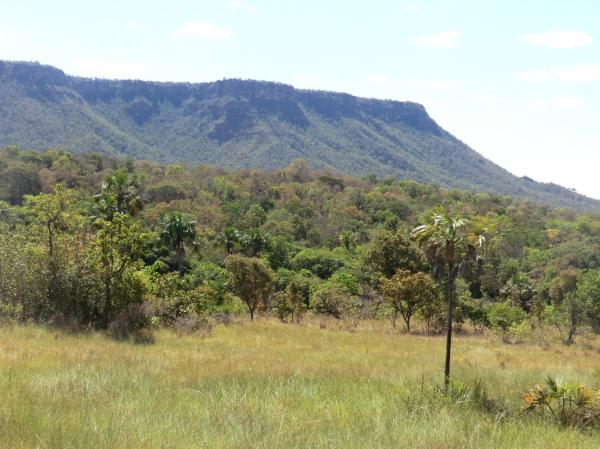

- Location within Brazil
- Nearest city: Gilbués, Piauí
- Coordinates: 10°03′S 45°54′W
- Area: 724,324 hectares (1,789,840 acres)
- Designation: National park
- Created: 16 July 2002
- Administrator: ICMBio

Nascentes do Rio Parnaíba National Park (Portuguese: Parque Nacional das Nascentes do Rio Parnaíba) is a national park of Brazil.

== Location ==
The park is in the cerrado biome. It covers 724,324 hectares (1,789,840 acres). It was established on 16 July 2002, and is administered by the Chico Mendes Institute for Biodiversity Conservation. The park lies in parts of the municipalities of Formosa do Rio Preto in Bahia, Lizarda, Mateiros and São Félix do Tocantins in Tocantins, Alto Parnaíba in Maranhão, and Barreiras do Piauí, Corrente, Gilbués and São Gonçalo do Gurguéia in Piauí.

== Conservation ==
Protected species in the park include the jaguar (Panthera onca), cougar (Puma concolor) and giant armadillo (Priodontes maximus).

== Sources ==
- Parna Nascentes do Rio Parnaíba (in Portuguese), Chico Mendes Institute for Biodiversity Conservation
- Unidade de Conservação: Parque Nacional das Nascentes do Rio Parnaíba (in Portuguese), MMA: Ministério do Meio Ambiente
