= Serra Geral do Tocantins Ecological Station =

Ecological station in Brazil

- Estação Ecológica Serra Geral do Tocantins
- IUCN category Ia (strict nature reserve)
- Location within Brazil
- Nearest city: Palmas, Tocantins
- Coordinates: 10°55′S 46°37′W
- Area: 707,078.75 hectares (1,747,229.6 acres)
- Designation: Ecological station
- Created: 27 September 2001
- Administrator: ICMBio

Serra Geral do Tocantins Ecological Station (Portuguese: Estação Ecológica Serra Geral do Tocantins) is an ecological station in the states of Bahia and Tocantins, Brazil. It is one of the largest such units in the country, and protects a sparsely populated area of the cerrado biome. The main threat comes from frequent fires set by the local people in order to create cattle pasturage.

== Location ==
The Serra Geral do Tocantins Ecological Station is in the Cerrado biome. It covers an area of 707,078.75 hectares (1,747,229.6 acres). (Note: The unit was created by presidential decree with an area of 716,306 hectares (1,770,030 acres). Various agreements and ordinances have since been published concerning land ownership and land use by residents of the unit. AS of May 2016 ICMBio showed the area as 707,078.75 hectares (1,747,229.6 acres).) It covers part of the Formosa do Rio Preto municipality of Bahia and the Almas, Mateiros, Ponte Alta do Tocantins and Rio da Conceição municipalities of Tocantins. The ecological station is one of the largest in the country, and covers an area with one of the lowest population densities in the country.

The terrain has a series of levels with gently undulating relief, with escarpments forming plateaus typical of an area of sedimentary deposits. Altitudes range from 300 to 900 metres (980 to 2,950 ft). The unit lies on the divide between the Tocantins-Araguaia basin and the São Francisco basin. Most of it is in the Tocantins-Araguaia basin, which drains the north, south and west parts in the Tocantins municipalities. The Balsas, Novo, Ponte Alta and Manoel Alves rivers are in this basin. The São Francisco basin drains part of the east of the unit in Bahia, and includes the Sapão River, a tributary of the Preto River of Bahia. The unit is above the Urucuia aquifer, a major freshwater storage site consisting mainly of sandstone.

Rainfall is 1,250 to 1,750 millimetres (49 to 69 in) annually. Average annual rainfall is 1,600 millimetres (63 in). Temperatures range from 16 to 34 °C (61 to 93 °F) with an average of 24 °C (75 °F). The climate is hot and dry in the period from May to September, with large swings in temperature between night and day, when temperatures may reach 47 °C (117 °F). The rainy season lasts from October to April.

== Flora ==
Vegetation is 81% grassland, 17% savannah and 1% forest. The remainder is covered by introduced flora. 417 plant species have been recorded in 89 families and 204 genera, including the threatened Myracrodruon urundeuva (Anacardiaceae). A type of Ochnaceae found occasionally in Campo Sujo areas near Morro do Fumo may be a new species. Some areas hold the "golden grass" capim-dourado (Syngonanthus nitens) and the Buriti palm (Mauritia flexuosa), species that suffer from great extractive pressure in the microregion of Jalapão.

== Fauna ==
Birds include parrots, toucans, emas, buzzards, blue macaws, Merganser, Inhambu-Carapé and sharp-tailed grass tyrant. The veery (Catharus fuscescens) of North America lives in the unit in from November to February. Nine endemic species of bird have been found. Large-billed antwren (Herpsilochmus longirostris), helmeted manakin (Antilophia galeata) and white-striped warbler (Myiothlypis leucophrys) are found in the forest formations of the unit. The collared crescentchest (Melanopareia torquata), rufous-sided scrub tyrant (Euscarthmus rufomarginatus), curl-crested jay (Cyanocorax cristatellus), shrike-like tanager (Neothraupis fasciata), white-rumped tanager (Cypsnagra hirundinacea) and coal-crested finch (Charitospiza eucosma) are found in the closed cerrado.

Typical cerrado animals are found such as the maned wolf (Chrysocyon brachyurus) and the hoary fox (Lycalopex vetulus). Other fauna include giant anteaters, tapirs, monkeys, caimans, pampas deer, jaguars, capybaras, anacondas, rattlesnakes and pythons. A new species of bat, Thyroptera devivoi, has been found only in the unit. Two new forms of lizard have been found in the unit, Bachia oxyrhina and Anops acrobeles, which may be considered endemic. Amphibians endemic to the cerrado include the Barycholos ternetzi, Proceratophrys goyana, Dendropsophus cruzi, Scinax constrictus, Physalaemus nattereri, Pseudopaludicola saltica and Leptodactylus sertanejo. Fish include the lambari Astyanax novae and the acará Cichlasoma sanctifranciscense. The insects Cyanallagma ferenigrum and Idiataphe batesi are found only in the cerrado.

== Conservation ==
The Serra Geral do Tocantins Ecological Station was created on 27 September 2001, and is administered by the Chico Mendes Institute for Biodiversity Conservation (ICMBio). It is classed as IUCN protected area category Ia (strict nature reserve). The objective is to preserve nature and support scientific research. Private property is not allowed in the unit, so owners of property were to be compensated. The station is closed to the public. It is one of the core areas of the Cerrado Biosphere Reserve, and is part of the Jalapão ecological corridor. The corridor includes the Jalapão State Park, which covers the Espírito Santo dunes and mountains.

== Threats ==
The local population is generally very poor, depending on subsistence farming and cattle raising, and the sale of golden grass (Syngonanthus nitens). Due to the irregular land ownership situation, as of 2005 the area suffered badly from illegal burning to create new pasturage for cattle. Burning is also done due to a local belief that it is needed by the golden grass, used in handicrafts. From May to October there is hardly any rain, and there is a high risk of fire. Natural fires caused by lightning would have occurred in early summer, followed by rain, so would have been small and of short duration. Man-made fires occur later in the season when the vegetation is drier and there is more wind, so last longer and cover larger areas. This occurs during the breeding season of most birds, who typically next on the ground or within 1.5 metres (4 ft 11 in) of the ground. The frequent fires also reduce available food supplies for the fauna including small animals and the birds of prey that depend on them.

Paving of highways in the area and the connections between Ponte Alta, Porto Nacional and Palmas have attracted squatters who plant one or two crops, then make pasture for cattle. The arrival of soybean farmers has caused new environmental problems since the soil is very fragile. There are no sewage treatment plants in the municipalities, so sewage is polluting the water table. Garbage dumps created by the inhabitants and litter from visitors are also a problem.

== Sources ==
- Esec Serra Geral do Tocantins (in Portuguese), Chico Mendes Institute for Biodiversity Conservation
- ESEC Serra Geral do Tocantins (in Portuguese), ISA: Instituto Socioambiental
- "Estação Ecológica Serra Geral do Tocantins", Ambiente Brasil (in Portuguese), 23 June 2010
- Miguel Bernardino dos Santos (July 2005), PLANO OPERATIVO DE PREVENÇÃO E COMBATE AOS INCÊNDIOS FLORESTAIS NA ESTAÇÃO ECOLÓGICA DE SERRA GERAL DO TOCANTINS (REGIÃO DO JALAPÃO) (in Portuguese), Palmas - TO: Ministério do Meio Ambiente, archived from the original on 2016-06-24
- Unidade de Conservação: Estação Ecológica Serra Geral do Tocantins (in Portuguese), MMA: Ministério do Meio Ambiente
