= Mateiros =

Municipality in Tocantins, Brazil

- Municipality
- The Municipality of Mateiros
- Flag
- Nickname: "The Sun of Amazonia" ("O Sol da Amazônia")
- Location of Mateiros in the State of Tocantins
- Coordinates: 05°15′25″S 48°12′00″W
- Country: Brazil
- Region: North
- State: Tocantins
- Founded: January 1, 1992

Area
  - Total: 9,591.543 km^{2} (3,703.315 sq mi)
- Elevation: 493 m (1,617 ft)

Population (2020)
  - Total: 2,729
  - Density: 0.2/km^{2} (0.52/sq mi)
- Time zone: UTC−3 (BRT)
- HDI (2000): 0.584 – medium

Mateiros is the easternmost city in the state of Tocantins. It is the only city in Tocantins to border the state of Piauí.

The municipality is in the microregion of Jalapão.

== Conservation ==
The municipality contains part of the 707,079-hectare (1,747,230-acre) Serra Geral do Tocantins Ecological Station, a strictly protected conservation unit created in 2001 to preserve an area of cerrado. It contains part of the 724,324-hectare (1,789,840-acre) Nascentes do Rio Parnaíba National Park, created in 2002. It also contains the 158,885-hectare (392,610-acre) Jalapão State Park, a fully protected conservation unit created in 2001.

== See also ==
- List of municipalities in Tocantins
- Mumbuca
