= Annona coriacea =

Scientific classification
- Kingdom: Plantae
- Clade: Tracheophytes
- Clade: Angiosperms
- Clade: Magnoliids
- Order: Magnoliales
- Family: Annonaceae
- Genus: Annona
- Species: A. coriacea

Binomial name
- Annona coriacea Mart.

Synonyms
- Annona geraensis Barb.Rodr.

Species of tree

Annona coriacea (araticum in Portuguese) is a fruit tree native to Brazil. Its original habitat includes the ecoregions of Cerrado, Caatinga, and Pantanal. There, it is typically found in scrublands and savannahs, though it is sometimes grown in orchards. Its wood is used in constructions and toys. This plant is cited in Flora Brasiliensis by Carl Friedrich Philipp von Martius.

A. coriacea typically reaches 3-6 meters tall and has a globose crown. It has simple leaves and terminal flowers that produce edible fruits, which are densely hairy when young. The heavily fragrant flowers are primarily pollinated by beetles at night.

This tree is susceptible to attack by the Mediterranean fruit fly.
