= Pozzebon =

Pozzebon is a surname. Notable people with the surname include:

- Chaules Volban Pozzebon (born 1982), Brazilian entrepreneur and organised criminal
- Demiro Pozzebon (born 1988), Italian football player
- Nicolò Pozzebon (born 1997), Italian football player
- Walter Pozzebon (born 1979), Italian rugby union coach and player

== See also ==
- Pozzobon, surname
