= Southeast Region, Brazil =

Southeast Region Região Sudeste
- Region
- Coordinates: 23°33′S 46°38′W
- Country: Brazil
- Largest city: São Paulo
- States: Espírito Santo, Minas Gerais, Rio de Janeiro, São Paulo

Area
  - Region: 924,511.3 km^{2} (356,955.8 sq mi)
  - Rank: 4th

Population
  - Region: 89,012,240
  - Rank: 1st
  - Density: 96.28032/km^{2} (249.3649/sq mi)
  - Rank: 1st
  - Urban: 97%

GDP
  - Total: R$ 4.713 trillion (US$ 874.258 billion)

HDI
  - Year: 2017
  - Category: 0.795 – high (2nd)
  - Life expectancy: 77.5 years (2nd)
  - Infant mortality: 18.3 per 1,000 (4th)
  - Literacy: 96,7% (2nd)
- Time zone: UTC-03 (BRT)

The Southeast Region of Brazil (Portuguese: Região Sudeste do Brasil, pronounced [ʁeʒiˈɐ̃w suˈdɛstʃi du bɾaˈziw]) is composed of the states of Espírito Santo, Minas Gerais, Rio de Janeiro, and São Paulo. It is the richest region of the country, responsible for approximately 53% of the Brazilian GDP (2022), as São Paulo, Rio de Janeiro, and Minas Gerais are the three richest states of Brazil, the top three Brazilian states in terms of GDP. The Southeast of Brazil also has the highest GDP per capita among all Brazilian regions.

The Southeast region accounts for about 44% of Brazil's total population, leading the country in population, urban population, population density, vehicles, industries, universities, airports, ports, highways, hospitals, schools, houses and many other areas.

== Geography ==
=== São Paulo ===
Climate classification for Southeastern Brazil, according to the Köppen criteria.

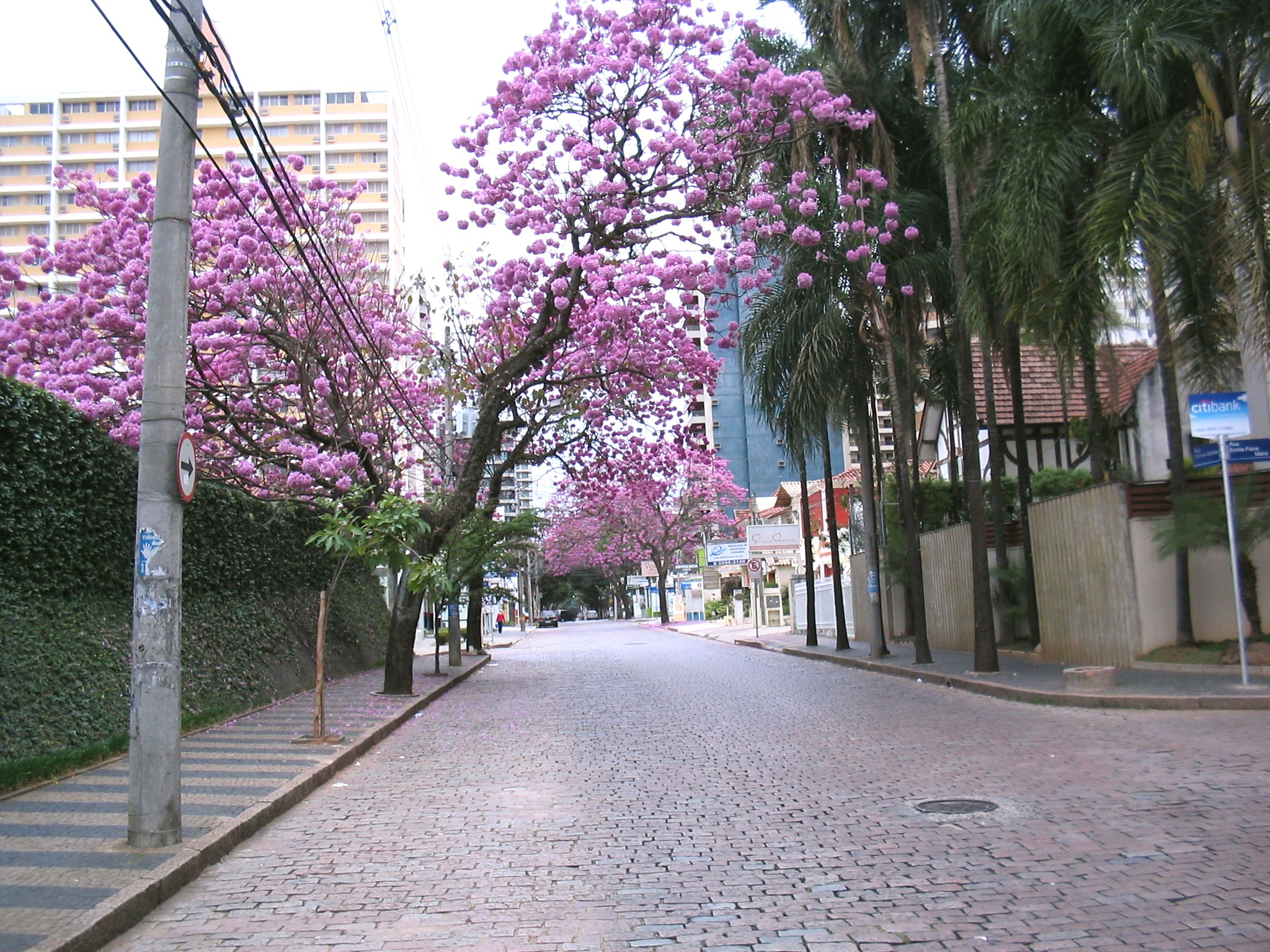
Ipê in Campinas.

Heart of the largest continued remnant of the Brazilian Atlantic Forest, the Ribeira Valley is a Natural Heritage of Humanity, granted heritage as a Biosphere Reserve by UNESCO. One of the biggest attractions is the biologic and ecosystems diversity, where approximately 400 species of birds, amphibians, reptiles and mammals live. The Alto Ribeira Tourist State Park (PETAR) is favoured by ecotourists, for its enormous diversity in geologic formations, among grottos and caves, rivers and waterfalls. There are currently 454 caves registered by the Brazilian Society of Speleology (SBE) in the State of São Paulo, all at the Ribeira Valley. The 280 caves located at PETAR represent the biggest concentration of caves in Brazil.

=== Minas Gerais ===
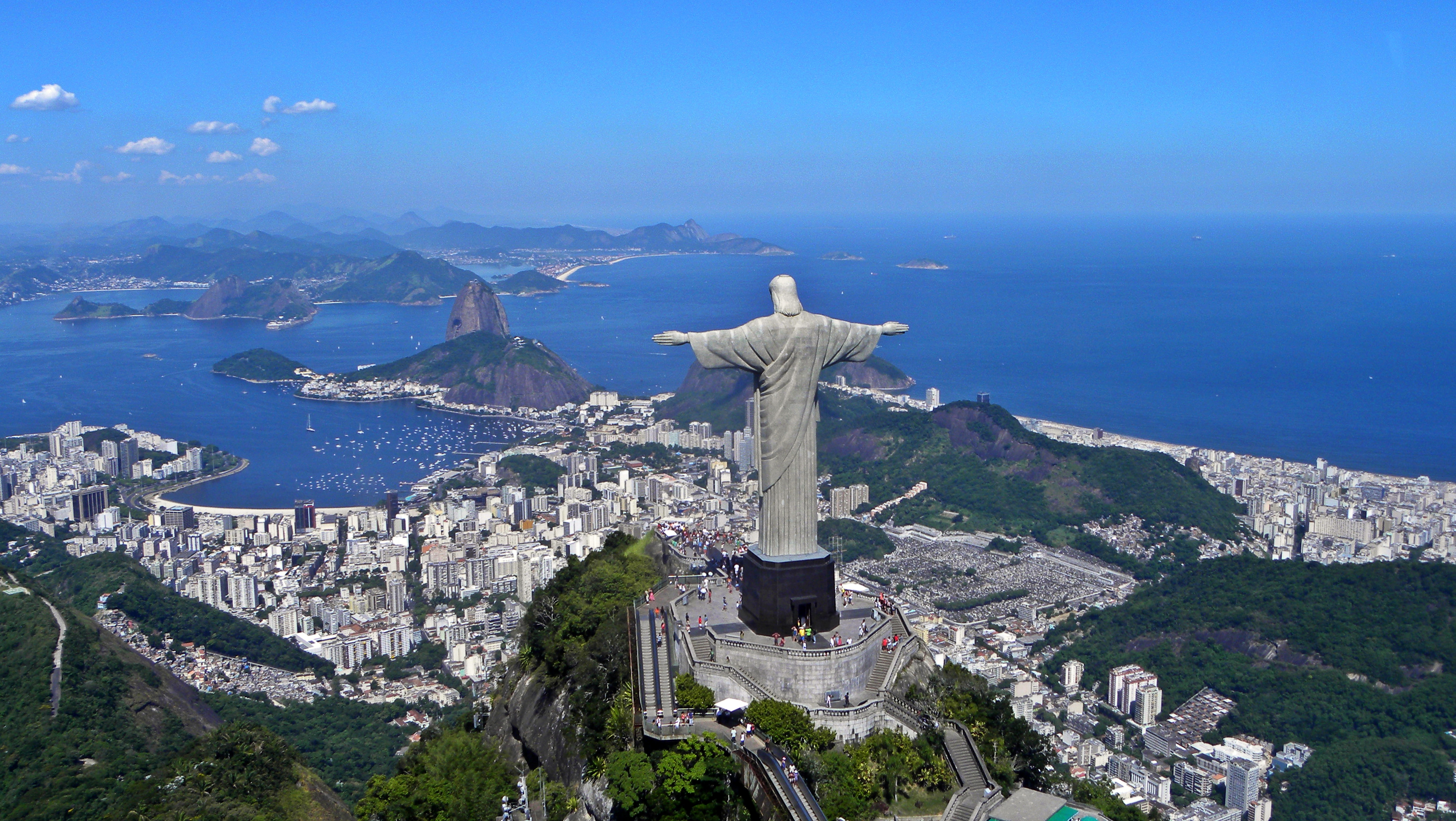
Rio de Janeiro.

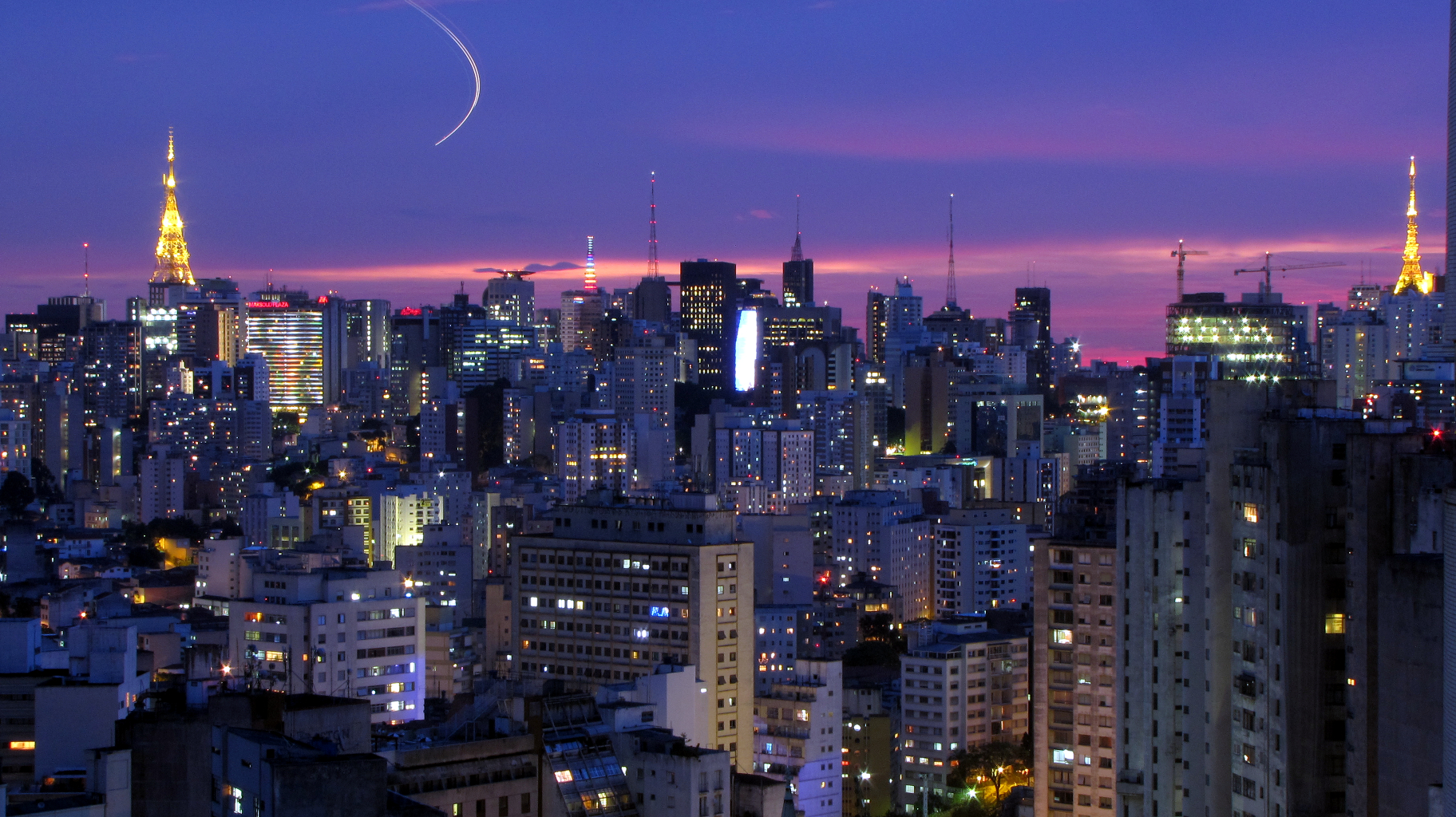
São Paulo.

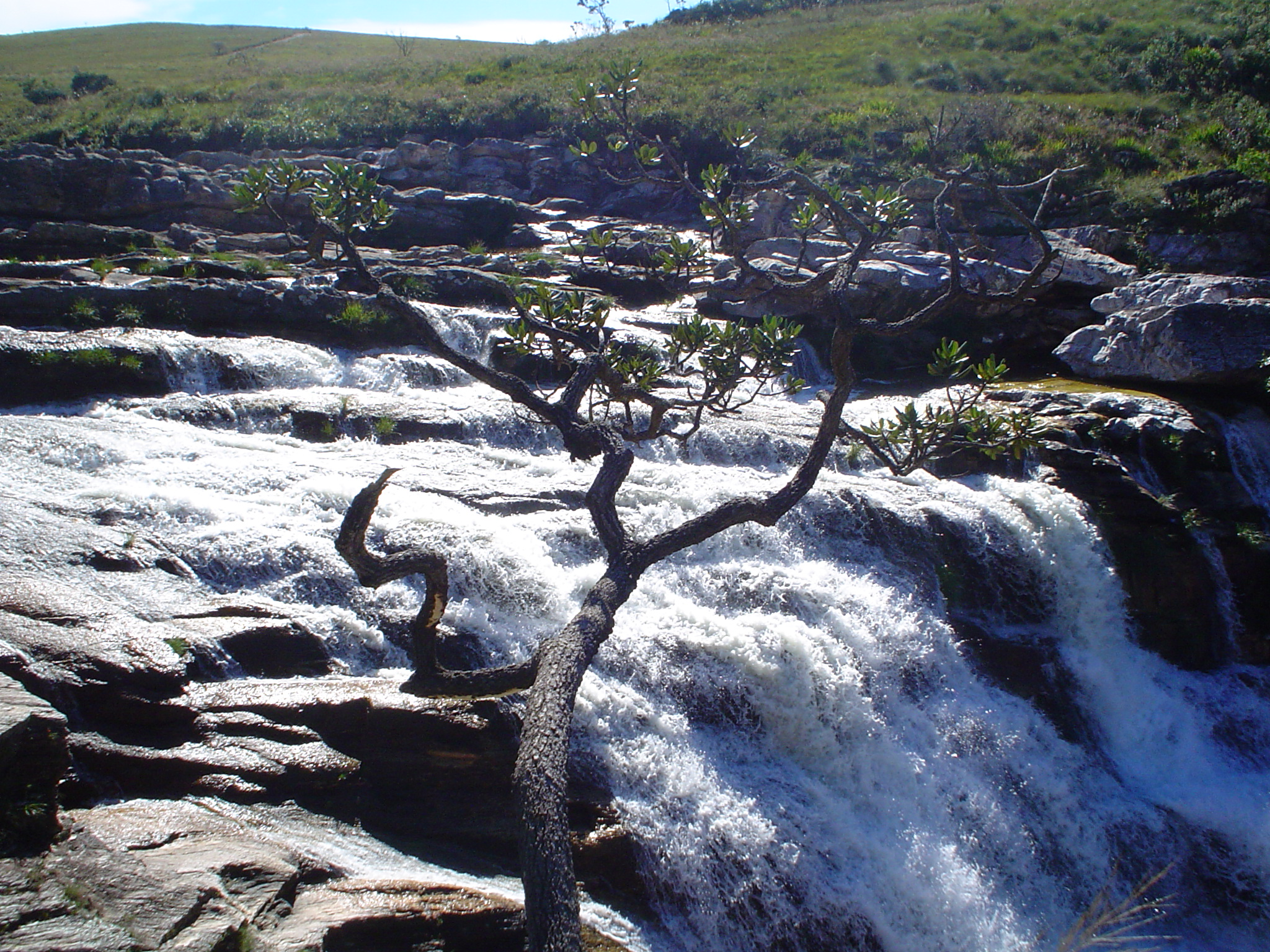
National Park of Serra da Canastra.

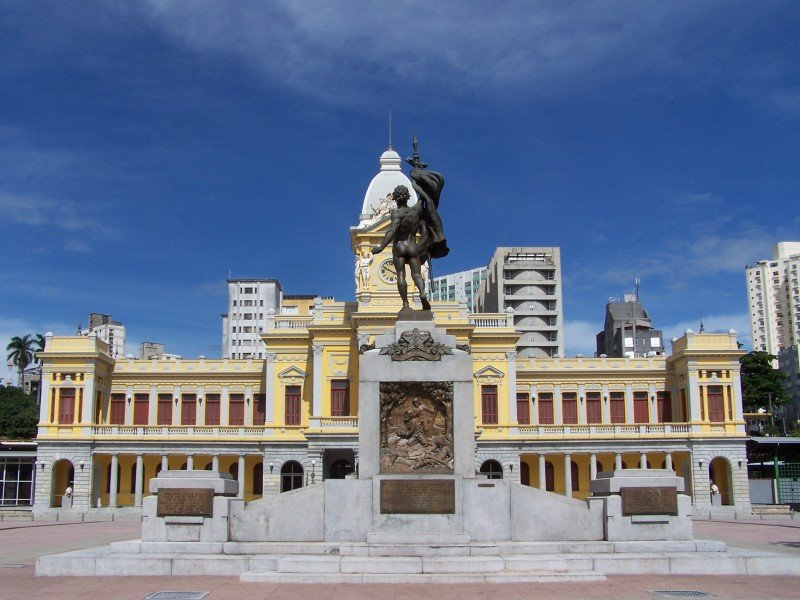
Station Square in Belo Horizonte.

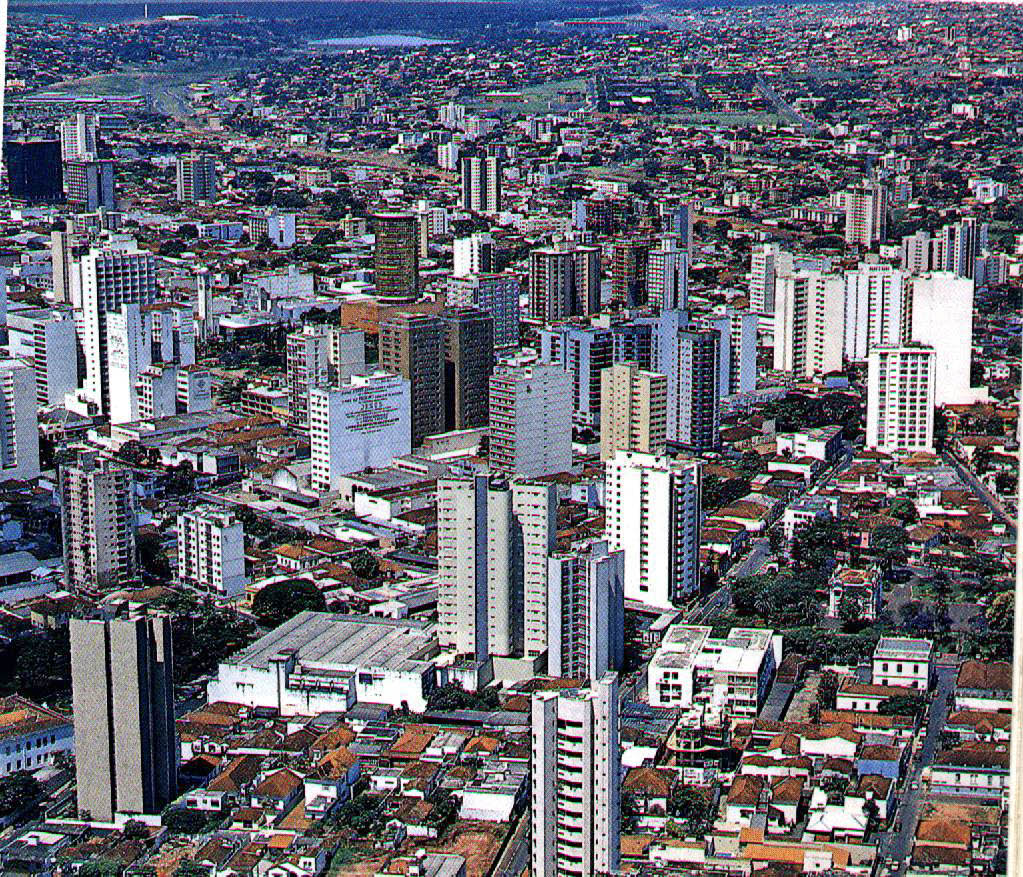
Uberlândia.

The landscape of the State is marked by mountains, valleys and caverns. In the Serra do Cipó, Sete Lagoas, Cordisburgo and Lagoa Santa, the caves and waterfalls. Minas Gerais is the source of some of the biggest rivers in Brazil, most notably the São Francisco, the Paraná and to a lesser extent, the Rio Doce. The state also holds many hydroelectric power plants, including Furnas dam. Some of the highest peaks in Brazil are in the mountain ranges in the southern part of the state, such as Serra da Mantiqueira and Serra do Cervo, which mark the border between Minas and its neighbors São Paulo and Rio de Janeiro. The most notable one is the Pico da Bandeira, the third highest mountain in Brazil at 2890 m, standing on the border with Espírito Santo state. The state also has huge reserves of iron and sizeable reserves of gold and gemstones, including emerald, topaz and aquamarine mines.

=== Rio de Janeiro ===
The state is part of the Mata Atlântica biome, and its topography comprises both mountains and plains, located between the Mantiqueira Mountains and the Atlantic Ocean. Its coast is carved by the bays of Guanabara, Sepetiba and Ilha Grande. There are prominent slopes near the ocean, also featuring diverse environments, such as restinga vegetation, bays, lagoons and tropical forests. Rio de Janeiro is the smallest state in the Southeast macroregion and one of the smallest in Brazil. It has, however, the third longest coastline in the country (second only to Bahia's and Maranhão's), extending 635 kilometers.

=== Espírito Santo ===
With a 46.180 square kilometers, it is about the size of Estonia, or half the size of Portugal, and has a variety of habitats including coastal plains, lakes, mountain forest, mangroves and many others. The main river in the state is the Doce. Other important river basins include the Santa Maria River Basin which is the northern branch of rivers which join the sea at Vitoria, and Jucu River Basin which flows into the sea at roughly the same place, but corresponds to the southern branch (which seems to come out of Vitoria). Espírito Santo's climate is tropical along the coast, with dry winters and rainy summers. North of Doce River it's generally drier and also hot. In the mountainous regions in the south and south west of the state, the tropical climate is strongly influenced by altitude, and the average temperatures are colder. The state can be divided into two areas: the low lying coastline and the highland area known as Serra (where one can find the 2.890 m Pico da Bandeira mountain), which is part of the larger Serra do Caparaó, the Caparaó Mountain Range. In the map to the right it is in the gray area in the extreme southwest of the state, and is shared with Minas Gerais.

== Demographics ==
=== Largest cities ===
City	Population (IBGE/2010)
(São Paulo (state)) São Paulo	11,253,503
(Rio de Janeiro (state)) Rio de Janeiro	6,320,446
(Minas Gerais) Belo Horizonte	2,375,151
(São Paulo (state)) Guarulhos	1,221,979
(São Paulo (state)) Campinas	1,080,113
(Rio de Janeiro (state)) São Gonçalo	999,728
(Rio de Janeiro (state)) Duque de Caxias	855,048
(Rio de Janeiro (state)) Nova Iguaçu	796,257
(São Paulo (state)) São Bernardo do Campo	765,463
(São Paulo (state)) Santo André	676,407
(Minas Gerais) Uberlandia	669,672

=== Racial groups ===
Ethnic Group/Race (IBGE/2022)	%
White	55.0%
Mixed	38.7%
Black	5.6%
Asian	0.7%
Indigenous	0.1%

== Economy ==
=== Agriculture ===
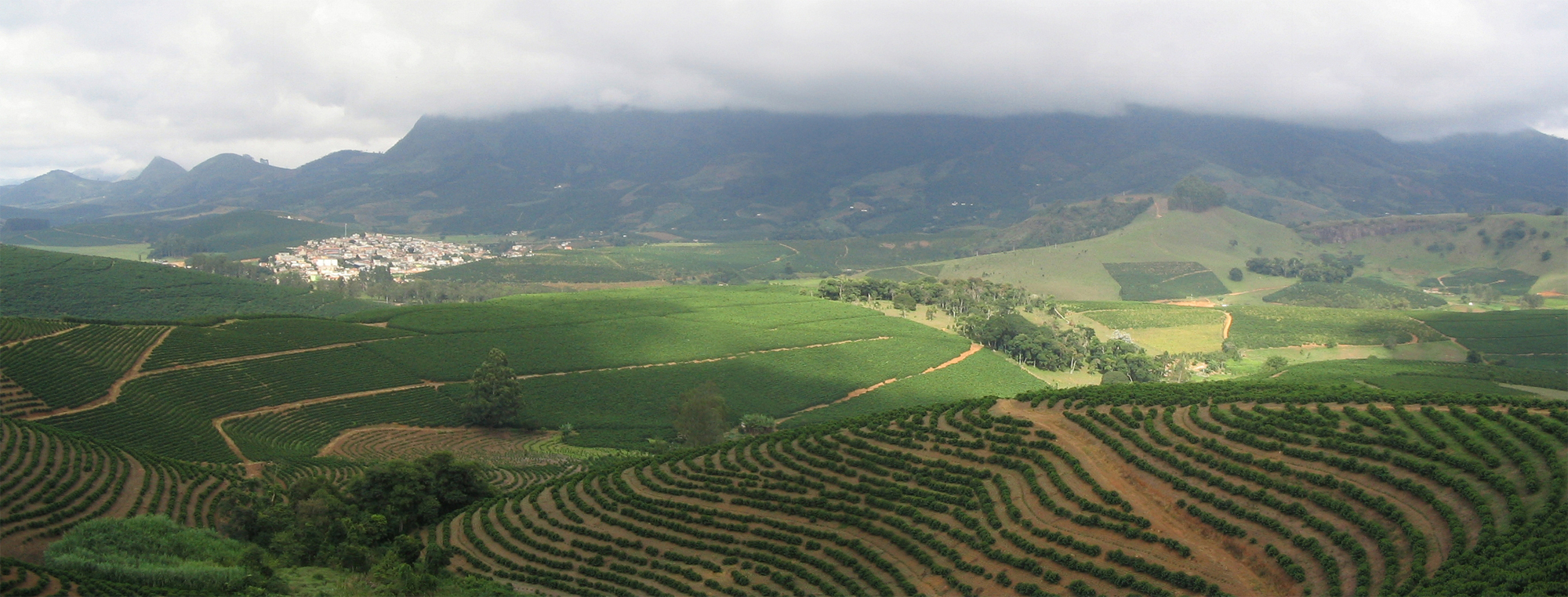
Coffee plantation in Minas Gerais.

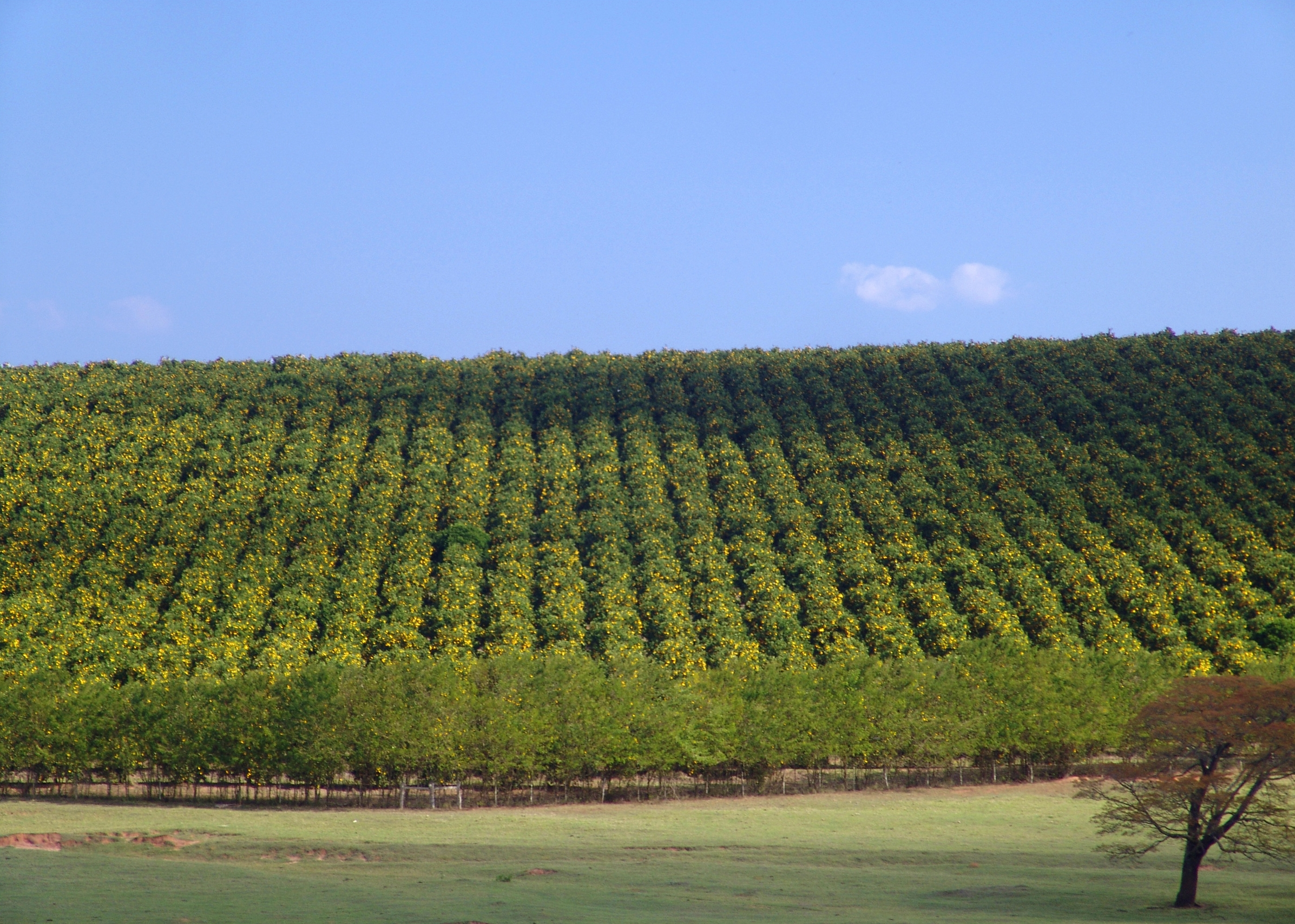
Orange plantation in São Paulo.

The main agricultural products grown are:

- coffee (85% of the country's production, which is the world's largest producer);
- sugarcane (65% of the country's production, which is the world's largest producer);
- orange (85% of the country's production, which is the world's largest producer);
- lemon (80% of the country's production, which is the fifth largest producer in the world);
- peanut (90% of the country's production, which is the 14th largest producer in the world);
- banana (35% of the country's production, which is the seventh largest producer in the world);
- sorghum (30% of national production, the country being the seventh largest producer);
- persimmon (70% of national production, the country being the 6th largest producer in the world);
- tomato (44% of national production, the country being the 10th largest producer);
- tangerine (60% of national production, the country being the 6th largest producer in the world);
- papaya (40% of national production, the country being the 2nd largest producer in the world);
- pineapple (27% of national production, the country being the 3rd world producer);
- cassava (13% of national production, the country being the 5th world producer).

The region still produces considerable amounts of:

- bean (more than 20% of national production, the country being the 3rd world producer);
- soy (7% of the country's production, which is the largest producer in the world);
- potato, carrot and strawberry (more than 50% of the country's production).

=== Livestock ===
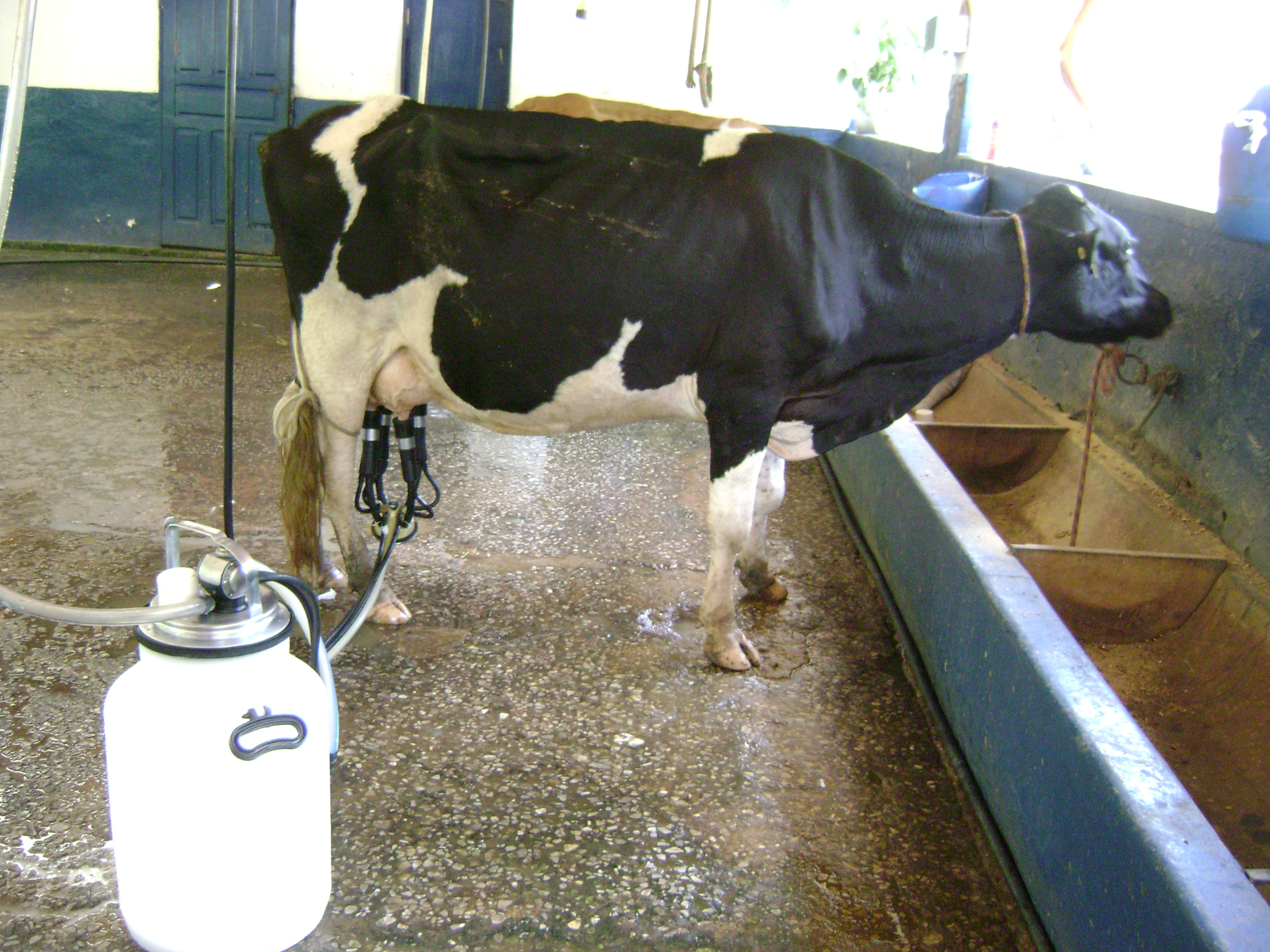
Milk extraction in Minas Gerais.

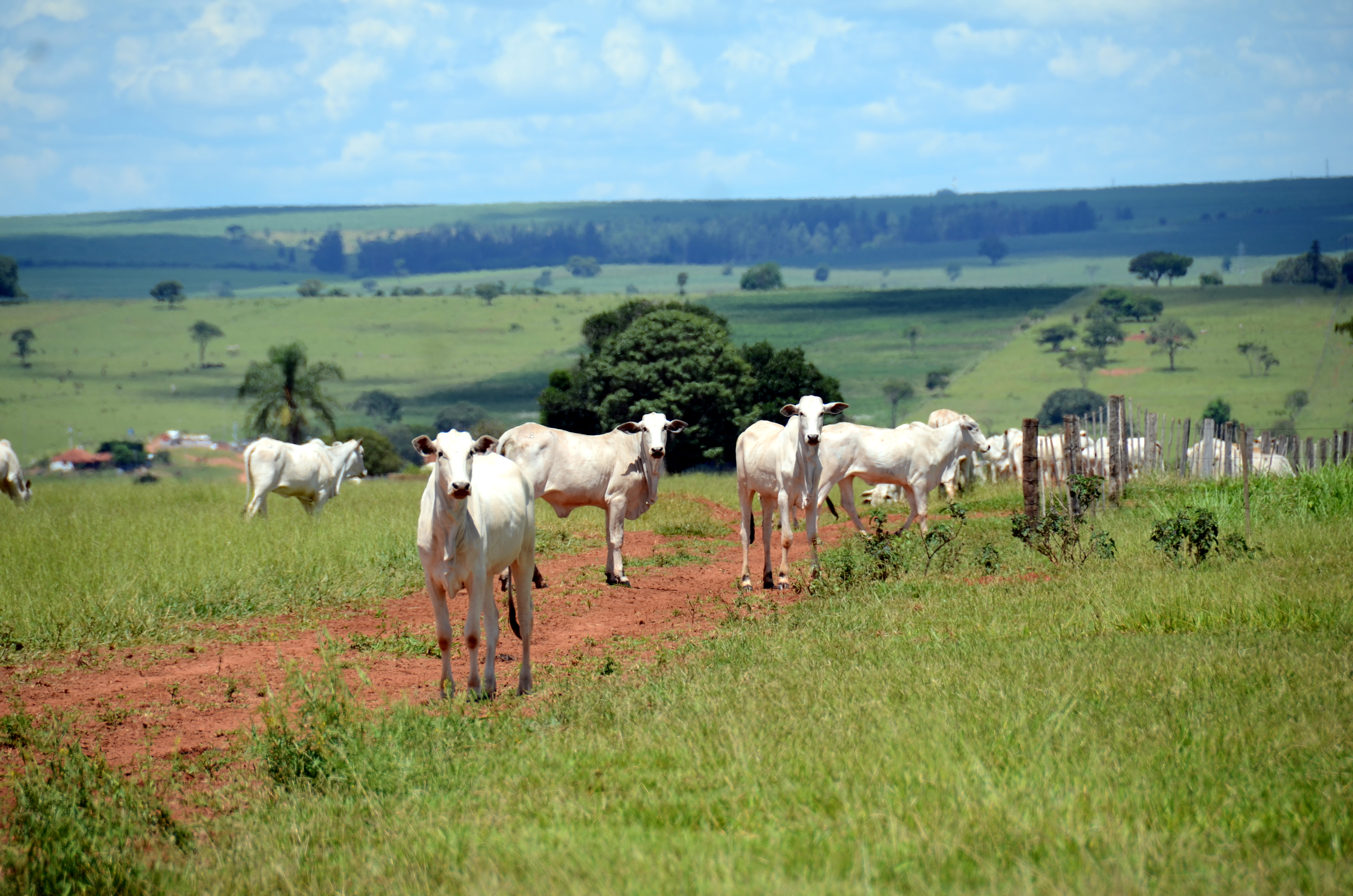
Cattle in São Paulo

The livestock also has great prominence in the region.

The Southeast is the second national producer of milk, with 34.2%, slightly losing compared to the South Region, which produces 35.7%. The southeast has the largest herd of cows milked: 30.4% of the total of 17.1 million existing in Brazil. The highest productivity, however, is that of the Southern Region, with an average of 3,284 liters per cow per year, which is why it has led the milk production ranking since 2015. Minas Gerais is the main milk-producing state in Brazil with the largest it is also effective for milked cows, responsible for 26.6% of production and 20.0% of all animals in milk. The municipality of Patos de Minas was the second largest producer in 2017, with 191.3 million liters of milk.

Poultry farming and egg production are the most important in the country. Flocks of poultry, according to IBGE, include chickens, roosters, hens and chicks. In 2018, the South region, with an emphasis on the creation of chickens for slaughter, was responsible for almost half of the Brazilian total (46.9%). Paraná only represented 26.2%. However, the situation is reversed when it comes to chickens. The first region in the ranking was the Southeast, with 38.9% of the country's total capital. A total of 246.9 million hens was estimated for 2018. The state of São Paulo was responsible for 21.9%. The national production of chicken eggs was 4.4 billion dozen in 2018. The Southeast region was responsible for 43.8% of the total produced. The state of São Paulo was the largest national producer (25.6%), with a total of 16.8 million birds. The Southeast is responsible for 64%, highlighting São Paulo (24.6%) and Espírito Santo (21.0%).

=== Mining ===
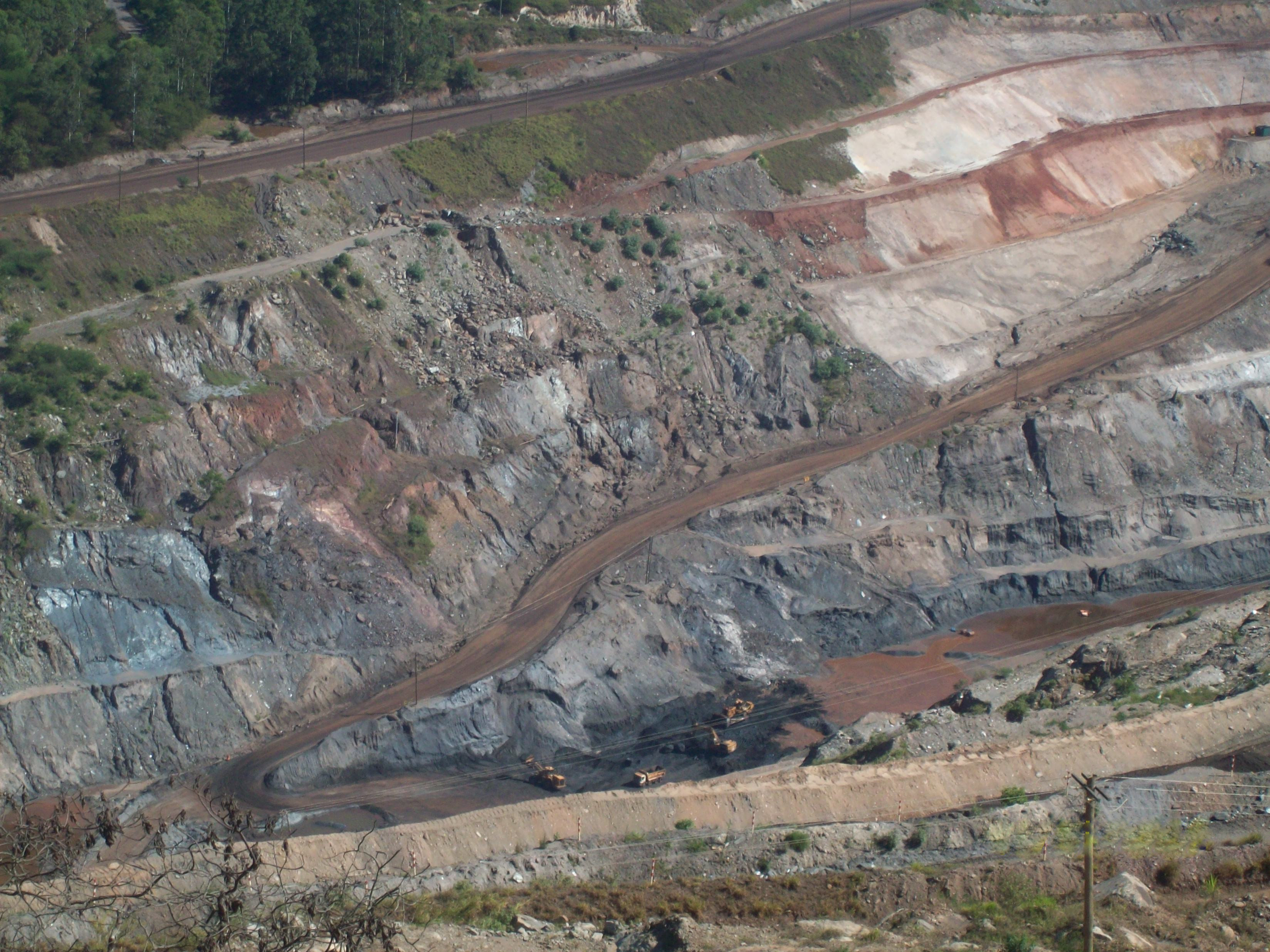
Iron mine in Minas Gerais.

In mineral production, in 2017, Minas Gerais was the country's largest producer of iron (277 million tons worth R $37.2 billion), gold (29.3 tons for a value of R $3.6 billion), zinc (400 thousand tons for a value of R $351 million) and niobium (in the form of hydrochloride) (131 thousand tons for a value of R $254 million). In addition, Minas was the second largest producer of aluminum (bauxite) (1.47 million tons at a value of R $105 million), third of manganese (296 thousand tons to a value of R $32 million) and 5th of tin (206 tons worth R $4.7 million). Minas Gerais had 47.19% of the value of the production of minerals marketed in Brazil (first place), with R $41.7 billion. The state has the largest production of various gemstones in the country. In aquamarine, Minas Gerais produces the most valuable stones in the world. In diamond, Brazil was the world's largest producer of diamonds from 1730 to 1870, mining occurred for the first time in the Serra da Canastra, region of Diamantina, even lowering the price of stone in everyone due to excess production. Minas Gerais continues to extract diamonds, in addition to having larger or smaller scale productions of agate, emerald, garnet, jasper, amethyst, and sapphire. Topaz and tourmaline stand out. Imperial Topaz, a valued variety of topaz, is only found in Ouro Preto. Brazil is the world's leading producer of topaz. It is also one of the world's largest tourmaline producers.

=== Industry ===
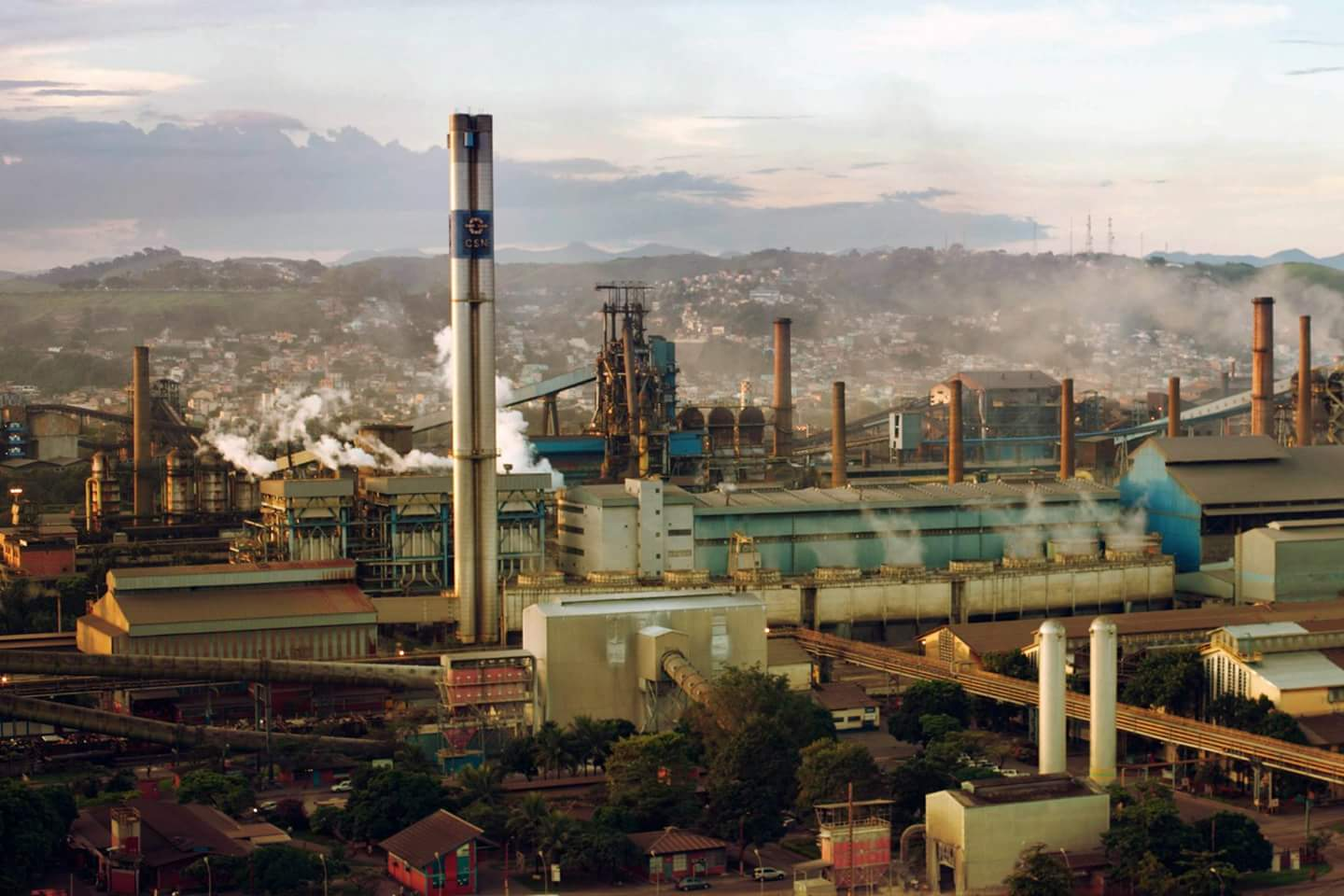
Steel manufacturer CSN, in Rio de Janeiro.

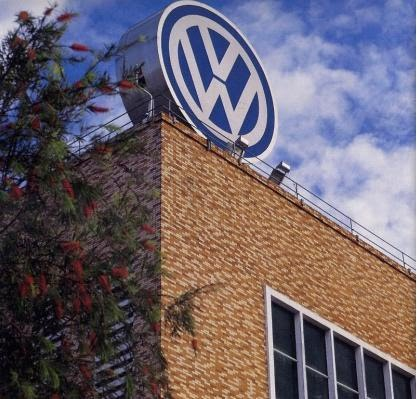
Volkswagen factory in São Paulo

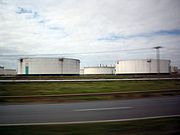
REPLAN, the Petrobras main refinery producing oil, located in Paulínia, São Paulo.

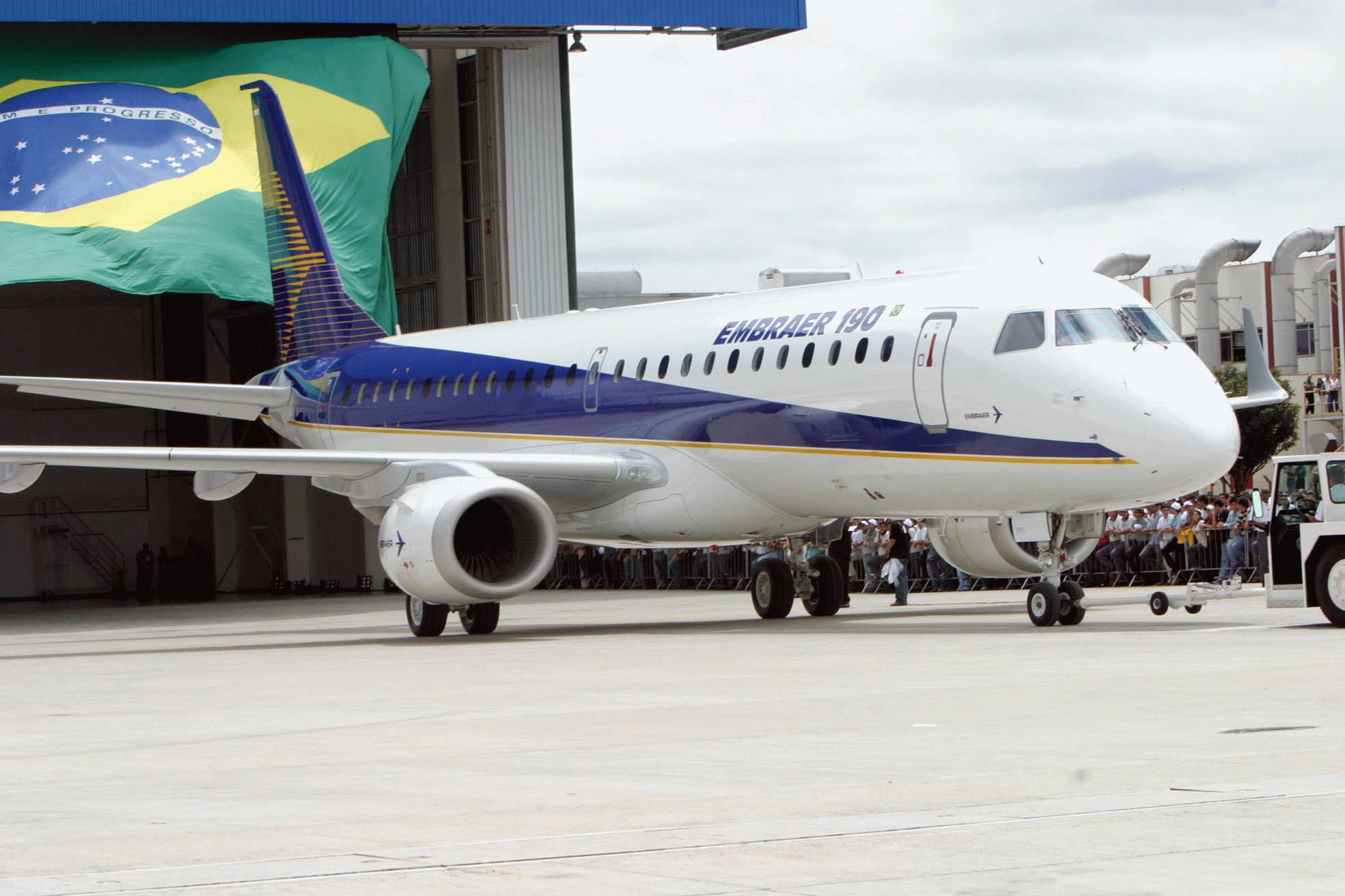
Embraer Y-190, aircraft developed by company Embraer which has its headquarters in São José dos Campos, inland of São Paulo .

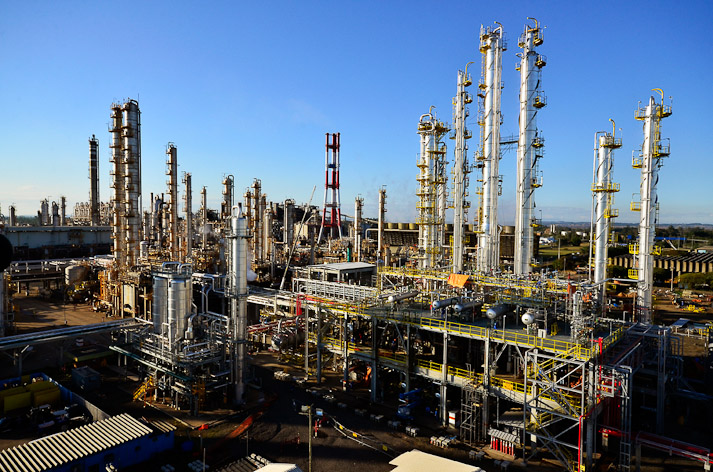
Chemical industry Braskem in São Paulo

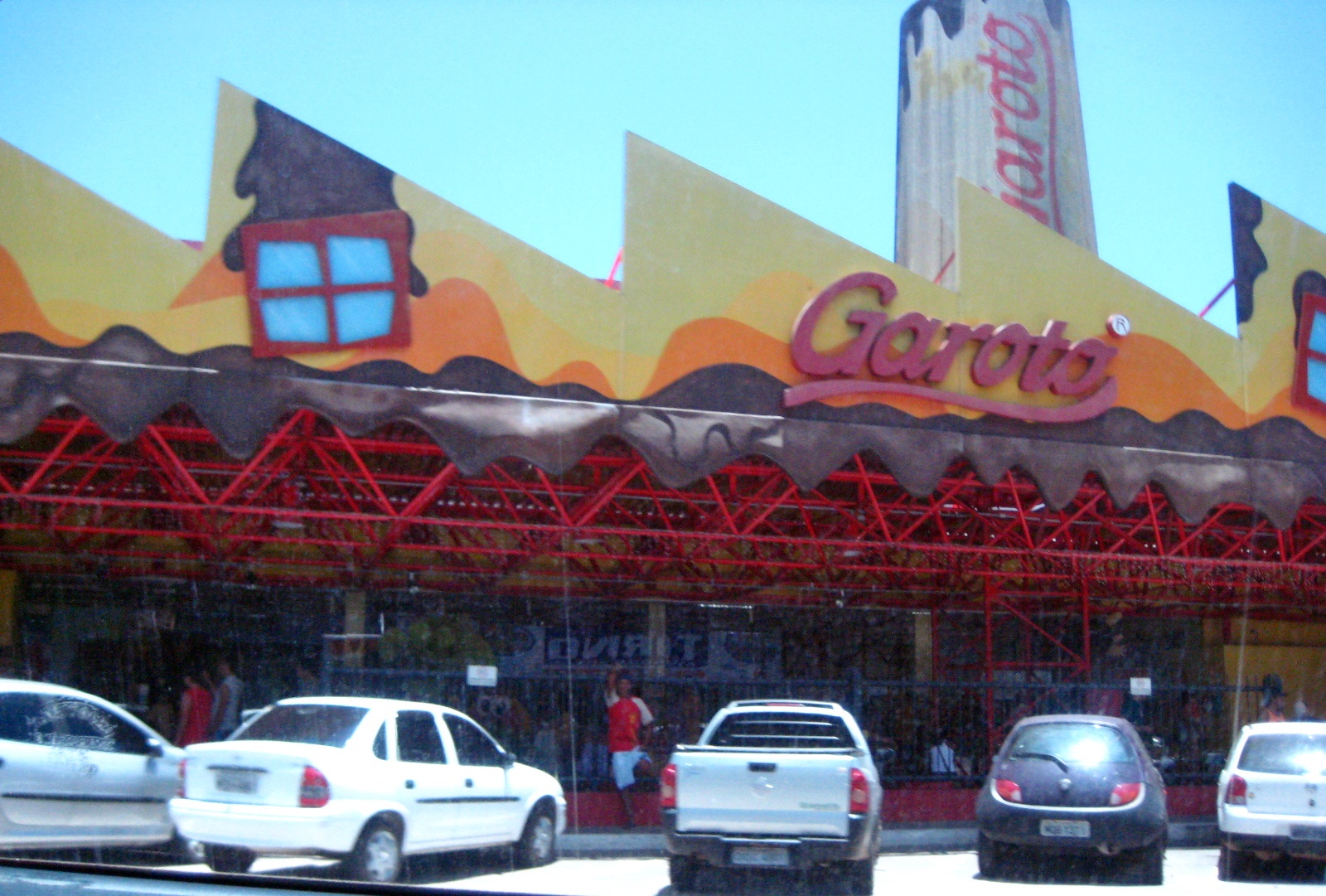
Garoto Chocolate Factory, in Espírito Santo.

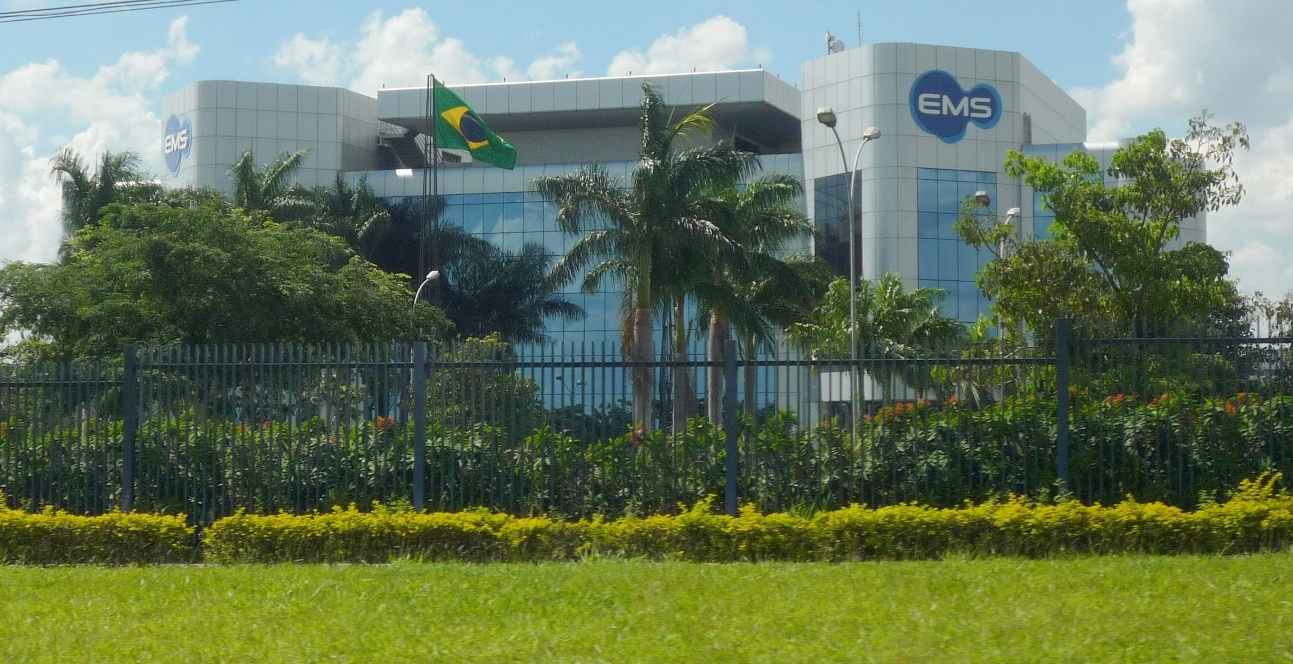
EMS pharmaceutical industry in São Paulo

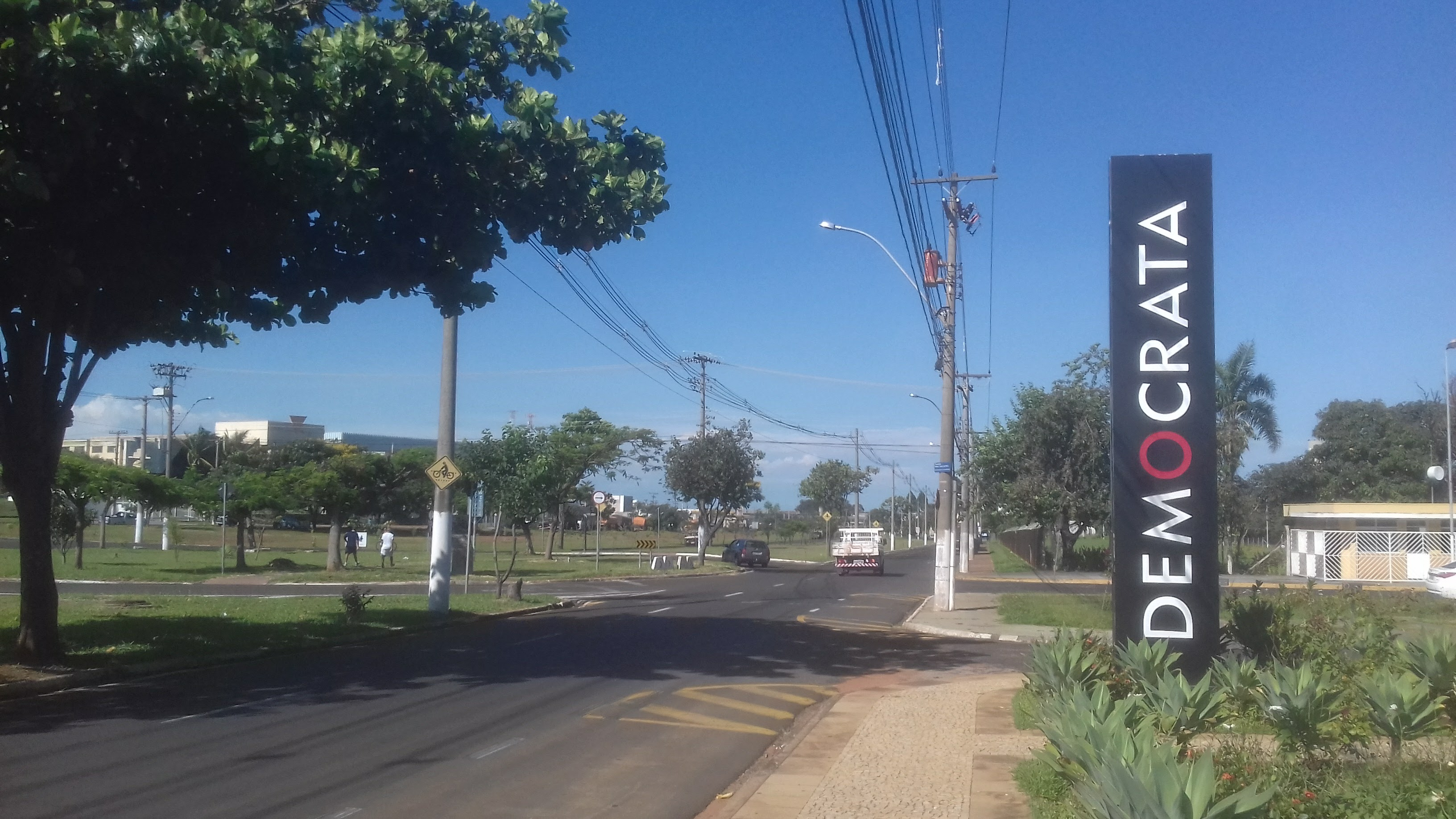
Portico of the Democrata men's shoe factory in Franca

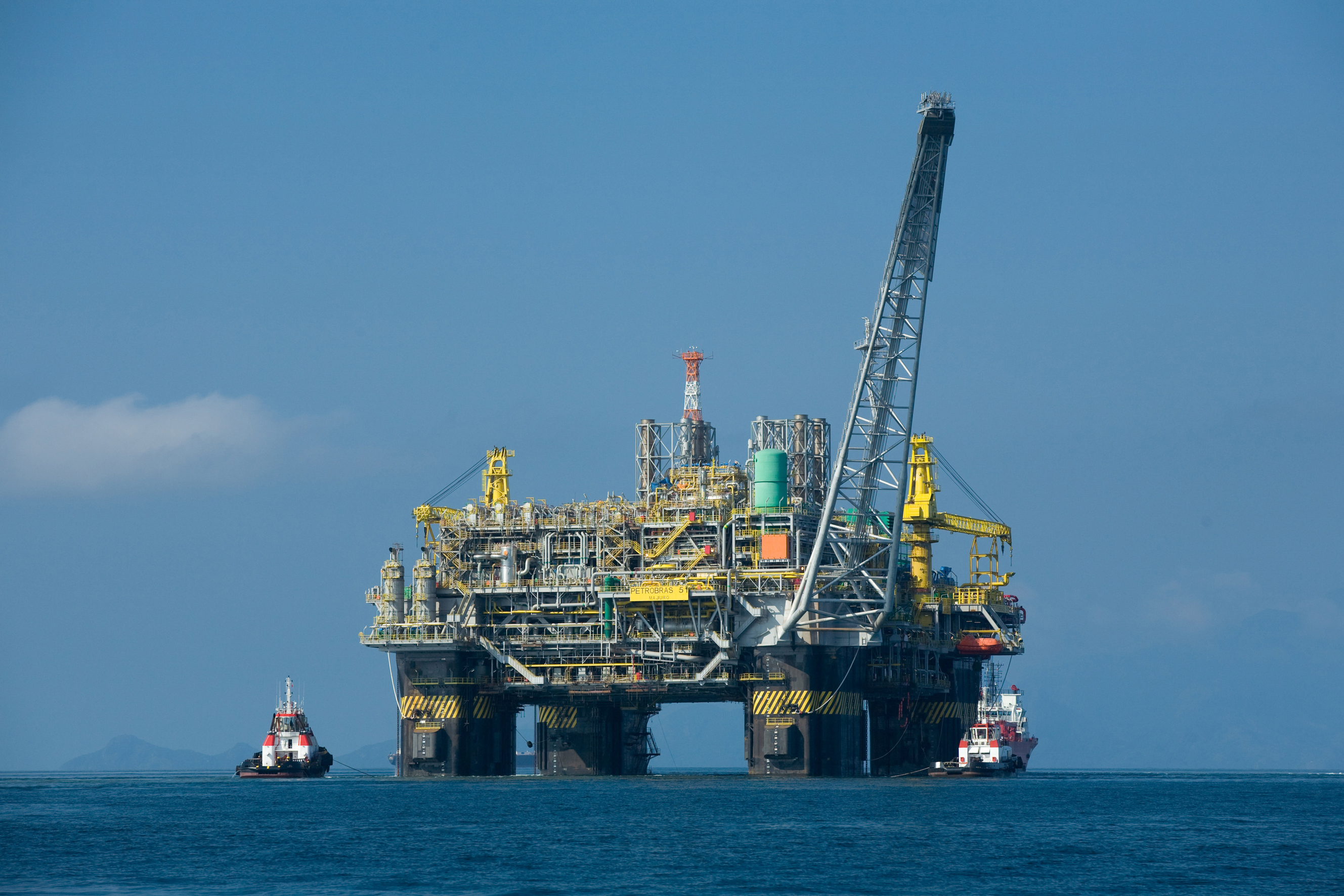
Platform P-51, for the production of oil and natural gas in Rio de Janeiro

In the Southeast region, the industrialization of the country began, making the transformation industry the main source of income and work in its states. The state of São Paulo became the largest industrial park in South America.

The Southeast Region has 53% of the industrial GDP of Brazil.

The main industrial activities in the region are:

- Iron and steel industry and metallurgy: It's in this region that the first industry of this type is located, the Companhia Siderúrgica Nacional, in the city of Volta Redonda, due to its proximity to a large area of iron mining, the so-called "iron quadrilateral", in the state of Minas Gerais. The Usiminas, in Ipatinga, which today is the largest crude steel producer in the country, and the Companhia Siderúrgica de Tubarão, in Vitória, Espírito Santo, are also installed in the region. The Southeast Region produces around 90% of the country's steel.

In Brazil, the automobile sector represents around 22% of industrial GDP. The Greater ABC Region, in São Paulo, is the first center and the largest automobile center in Brazil. When the country's manufacturing was practically restricted to ABC, the State represented 74.8% of Brazilian production in 1990. In 2017, this index decreased to 46.6%, and in 2019, to 40.1%, due to a phenomenon of internalization of the production of vehicles in Brazil, driven by factors such as unions, which made excessive labor and payroll charges, discouraged investment and favored the search for new cities. The development of the ABC cities helped curb appeal, due to rising real estate costs and higher density of residential areas. Sul Fluminense (Rio de Janeiro) was already the second largest pole in 2017, but in 2019 it fell to fourth place, behind Paraná (15%) and Minas Gerais (10.7%). In the Southeast there are factories of GM, Volkswagen, Fiat, Ford, Honda, Toyota, Mitsubishi, Nissan, Hyundai, Mercedes-Benz, Land Rover, Citroen / Peugeot, Scania and Iveco.

In the production of tractors, in 2017, the main manufacturers in Brazil were John Deere, New Holland, Massey Ferguson, Valtra, Case IH and the Brazilian Agrale. They all have factories in the southeast, basically in São Paulo.

- Petroleum: Almost all of Brazil's oil and natural gas is extracted in the Southeast, mainly in Rio de Janeiro, but also in Espírito Santo and São Paulo. Most of the oil refining is also carried out in the region. Rio de Janeiro presents great importance in oil prospecting, which São Paulo has a great importance in the refining activity, being located in that state the main refineries of the country, among them, the REPLAN, the main of the country. In addition to oil, there is the extraction of natural gas from the Santos maritime basin and, until a few years ago, there was the extraction of bitumen in the Paraíba river valley.
- High technology: The so-called "Brazilian silicon valley" is located in that region, made up of the cities of São Paulo, São José dos Campos, São Carlos and Campinas. These four cities concentrate industries of computing, telecommunications, electronics and other activities involving high technology; in addition to having important research centers and important universities, such as the "Technological Institute of Aeronautics" - ITA, in São José dos Campos. Brazil has two large production centers for electronic products, located in the Metropolitan Region of Campinas, in the State of São Paulo, and in the Manaus Free Trade Zone, in the State of Amazonas. There are large internationally renowned technology companies, as well as part of the industries that participate in their supply chain. The country also has other smaller centers, such as the municipalities of São José dos Campos and São Carlos, in the state of São Paulo. In Campinas there are industrial units of groups such as General Electric, Samsung, HP and Foxconn, a manufacturer of Apple and Dell. São José dos Campos, focuses on the aviation industry. This is where the headquarters of Embraer, a Brazilian company that is the third largest aircraft manufacturer in the world, after Boeing and Airbus, is located. In the production of cell phones and other electronic products, Samsung produces in Campinas; LG produces in Taubaté; Flextronics, which produces Motorola cell phones, produces in Jaguariúna; and Semp-TCL produces in Cajamar. In Santa Rita do Sapucaí, Minas Gerais, 8 thousand jobs are linked to the sector, with more than 120 companies. Most produce equipment for the telecommunications industry, such as decoders, including those used in the transmission of the digital television system.

In 2011, Brazil had the sixth largest chemical industry in the world, with net sales of $157 billion, or 3.1% of world sales. At that time, there were 973 factories of chemical products for industrial use. They are concentrated in the Southeast Region, mainly in São Paulo. In 2018, the Brazilian chemical sector was the eighth largest in the world, representing 10% of the national industrial GDP and 2.5% of the total GDP. In 2020, imports will occupy 43% of domestic demand for chemical products. Since 2008, the average use of capacity in the Brazilian chemical industry has been at a level considered low, ranging between 70 and 83%.

In pharmaceutical Industry, most of the companies in Brazil have been established in São Paulo and Rio de Janeiro for a long time. In 2019, the situation was that, due to the tax advantages offered in states such as Pernambuco, Goiás and Minas Gerais, companies were leaving RJ and SP and going to these states. In 2017, Brazil was considered the sixth largest pharmaceutical market in the world. Drug sales in pharmacies reached around R $57 billion (US$17.79 billion) in the country. The pharmaceutical market in Brazil had 241 regulated and authorized laboratories for the sale of medicines. Of these, the majority (60%) have national capital. Multinational companies had approximately 52.44% of the market, with 34.75% in commercialized packaging. Brazilian laboratories represent 47.56% of the market in sales and 65.25% in cases sold. In the distribution of drug sales by state, São Paulo ranked first: São Paulo's pharmaceutical industry had a turnover of R $53.3 billion, 76.8% of total sales throughout the country. The companies that benefited the most from the sale of drugs in the country in 2015 were EMS, Hypermarcas (NeoQuímica), Sanofi (Medley), Novartis, Aché, Eurofarma, Takeda, Bayer, Pfizer and GSK.

In food industry, in 2019, Brazil was the second largest exporter of processed foods in the world, with a value of US$34.1 billion in exports. The revenue of the Brazilian food and beverage industry in 2019 was R $699.9 billion, 9.7% of the country's gross domestic product. In 2015, the food and beverage industrial sector in Brazil comprised 34,800 companies (not counting bakeries), the vast majority of which were small. These companies employed more than 1,600,000 workers, making the food and beverage industry the largest employer in manufacturing. There are around 570 large companies in Brazil, which account for a good part of the industry's total income. São Paulo created companies such as: Yoki, Vigor, Minerva Foods, Bauducco, Santa Helena, Marilan, Ceratti, Fugini, Chocolates Pan, Embaré, among others. Minas Gerais created food companies of national importance such as Itambé and Pif Paf Alimentos. Espírito Santo created Chocolates Garoto and Rio de Janeiro created Piraquê and Granfino.

In the Footwear industry, in 2019 Brazil produced 972 million pairs. Exports were around 10%, reaching almost 125 million pairs. Brazil ranks fourth among world producers, behind China, India and Vietnam, and 11th among the largest exporters. Of the pairs produced, 49% were made of plastic or rubber, 28.8% were made of synthetic laminate, and only 17.7% were made of leather. The largest pole in Brazil is in Rio Grande do Sul, but São Paulo has important shoe centers, such as the one in the city of Franca, specialized in men's footwear, in the city of Jaú, specialized in women's footwear and in the city of Birigui, specialized in footwear. children. Jaú, Franca and Birigui represent 92% of footwear production in the state of São Paulo. Birigui has 350 companies, which generate around 13 thousand jobs, producing 45.9 million pairs per year. 52% of children's shoes in the country are produced in this city. From Birigui came most of the most famous children's shoe factories in the country. Jaú has 150 factories that produce around 130 thousand pairs of cheap women's shoes per day. The footwear sector in Franca has around 550 companies and employs about 20,000 employees. Most of the most famous men's shoe factories in the country come from São Paulo. Minas Gerais has a pole specialized in cheap shoes and shoes in Nova Serrana. The city has around 830 industries, which in 2017 produced around 110 million pairs. However, overall, the Brazilian industry has been struggling to compete with Chinese footwear, which is priced unbeatable due to the difference in tax collection from one country to another, in addition to the absence of heavy Brazilian labor taxes in China, and the Brazilian businessman has had to invest in value-added products, combining quality and design, in order to survive.

In textile industry, Brazil, despite being among the 5 largest producers in the world in 2013, and being representative in the consumption of textiles and clothing, has very little insertion in world trade. In 2015, Brazilian imports ranked 25th (US$5.5 billion). And in exports, it was only 40th in the world ranking. Brazil's participation in the world trade of textiles and clothing is only 0.3%, due to the difficulty of competing in price with producers in India and mainly in China. The gross value of production, which includes the consumption of intermediate goods and services, of the Brazilian textile industry corresponded to almost R $40 billion in 2015, 1.6% of the gross value of industrial production in Brazil. São Paulo (37.4%) is the largest producer. The main productive areas of São Paulo are the Metropolitan Region of São Paulo and Campinas. Minas Gerais has 8.51% (third largest production in the country).

In home appliance industry, sales were 12.9 million units in 2017. The sector had its sales peak in 2012, with 18.9 million units. The brands that sold the most were Brastemp, Electrolux, Consul and Philips. Brastemp is originally from São Bernardo do Campo. São Paulo was also the place where Metalfrio was founded.

=== Statistics ===
Vehicles: 36,030,943 (Jan/2012); Telephones: 23,878,000 (April/2007); Cities: 1,668 (2007).

== Education ==
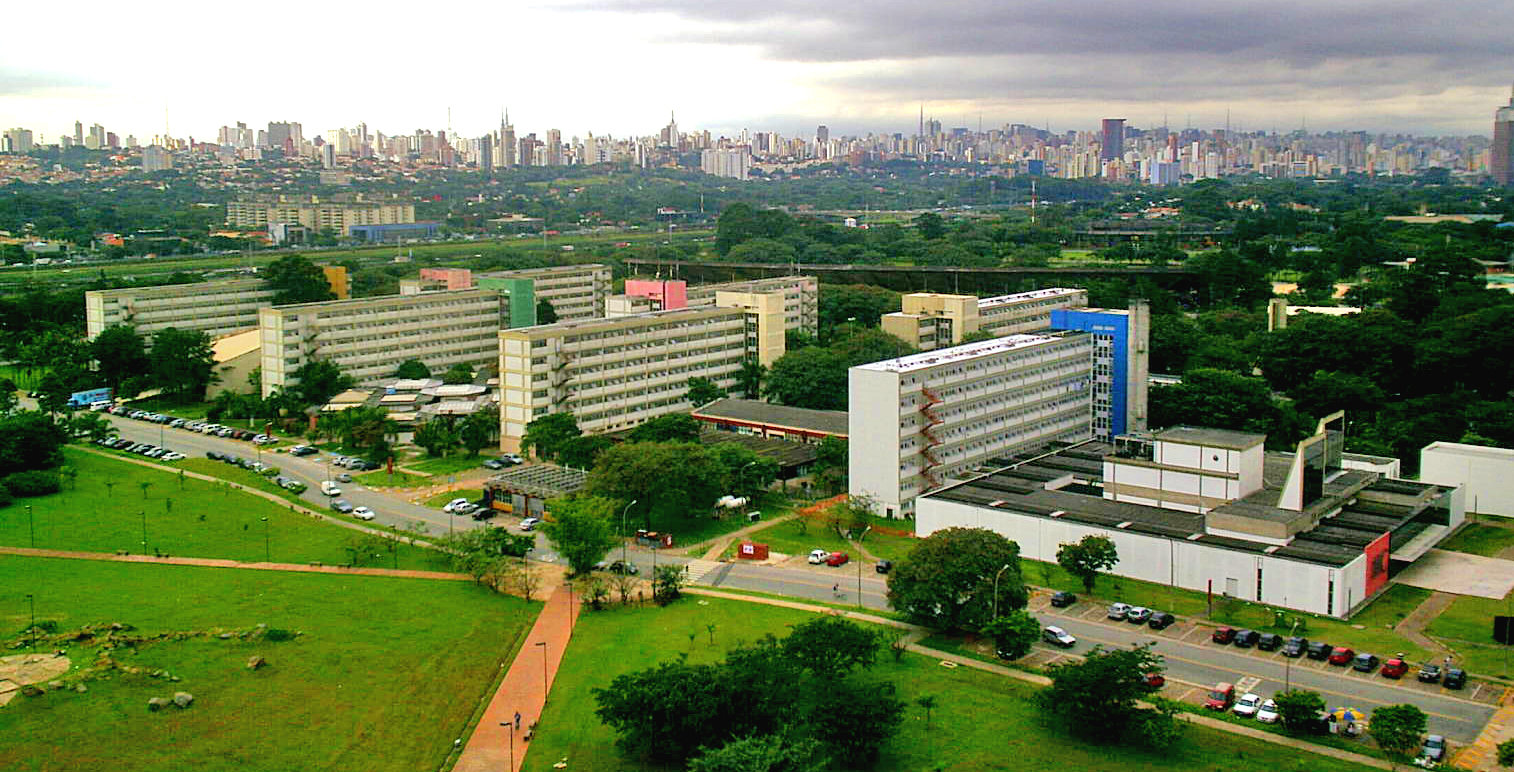
University of São Paulo.

Portuguese is the official national language, and thus the primary language taught in schools. English and Spanish are also part of the official high school curriculum. French is also widely studied.

=== Educational institutions ===
- Universidade de São Paulo (USP);
- Universidade Federal do Rio de Janeiro (UFRJ);
- Universidade Federal de Minas Gerais (UFMG);
- Universidade Federal do Espírito Santo (Ufes);
- Universidade Estadual de Campinas (Unicamp);
- Universidade Federal Fluminense (UFF);
- Universidade Estadual Paulista (Unesp);
- Universidade Federal de Viçosa (UFV);
- Universidade Federal de São Paulo (Unifesp);
- Universidade Federal de Ouro Preto (Ufop);
- Universidade Federal de Juiz de Fora (UFJF);
- Universidade Federal de Uberlândia (Ufu);
- Universidade do Estado do Rio de Janeiro (UERJ);
- Universidade Federal de São Carlos (UFSCar);
- Universidade Federal de Lavras (UFLA);
- and many others.

== Infrastructure ==
=== International Airports ===
- São Paulo

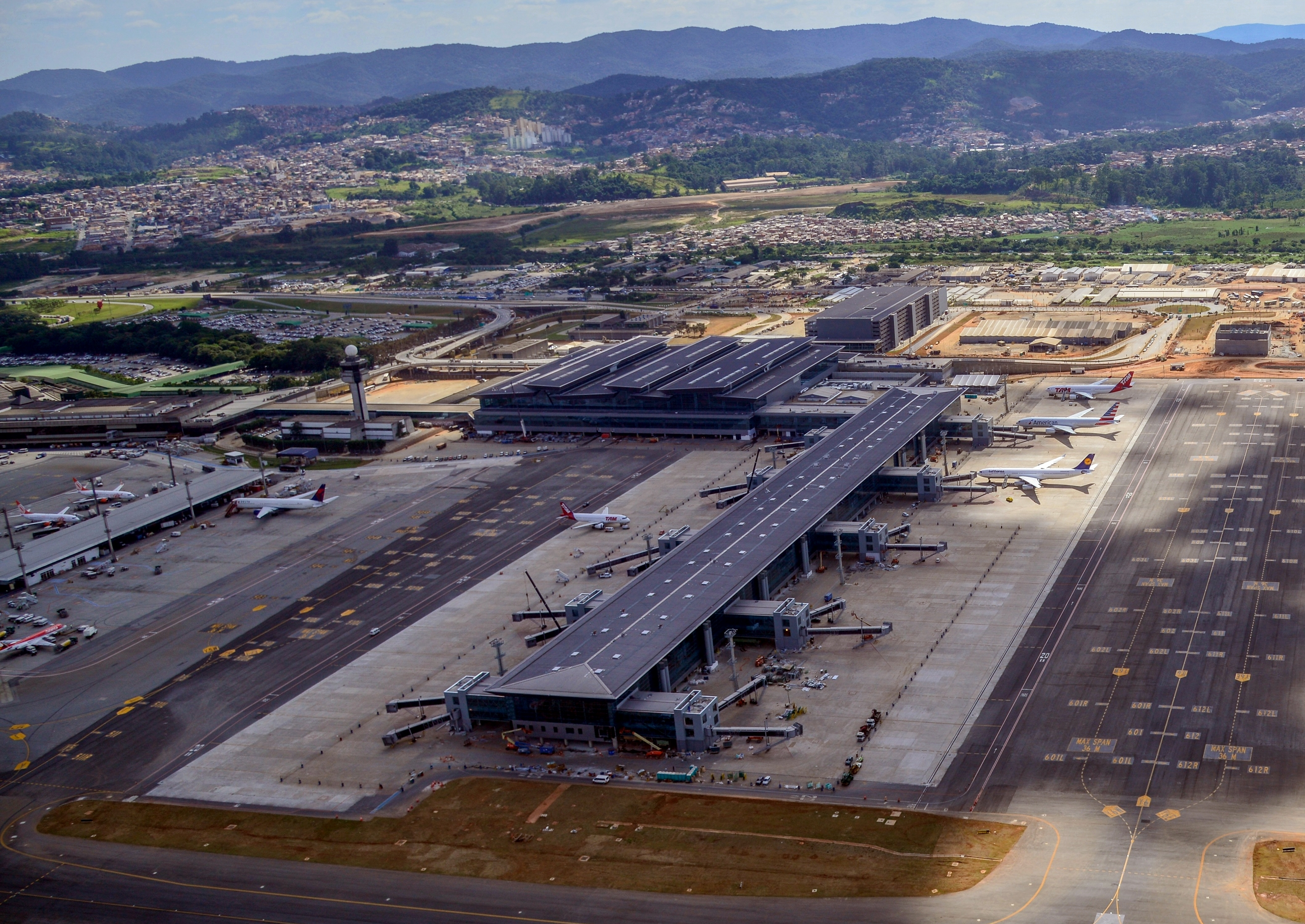
São Paulo-Guarulhos International Airport (GRU).

São Paulo-Guarulhos International Airport connects Brazil to 28 countries with nearly 100,000 daily visitors. With capacity to serve 15 million passengers a year, in two terminals, the airport currently handles 12 million users. Construction of a third passenger terminal is pending, to raise yearly capacity to 29 million passengers. The project, in the tendering phase, is part of the airport's master plan and will get under way shortly. São Paulo International Airport is also one of the main air cargo hubs in Brazil. The roughly 100 flights a day carry everything from fruits grown in the São Francisco Valley to the most sophisticated medications created by science. The airport's cargo terminal is South America's largest and stands behind only Mexico City's in all of Latin America. In 2003, over 75,000 metric tons of freight passed through the terminal.

- Rio de Janeiro

Since August 2004, with the transfer of many flights from Santos-Dumont Airport, Rio de Janeiro International Airport has returned to being the main doorway to Brazil. According to data from the official Brazilian travel bureau, Embratur, nearly 40% of foreign tourists who visit Brazil choose Rio as their gateway, meaning Galeão Airport. Besides linking Rio to the rest of Brazil with domestic flights, Galeão has connections to more than 18 countries. It can handle up to 15 million users a year in two passenger terminals. Located only 20 kilometers from downtown Rio, the international airport is served by several quick access routes, such as the Linha Vermelha and Linha Amarela freeways and Avenida Brasil, thus conveniently serving residents of the city's southern, northern and western zones. There are special shuttle buses linking Galeão to Santos-Dumont, and bus and taxi service to the rest of the city. The airport complex also has Brazil's longest runway at 4.240 meters, and one of South America's largest and best equipped cargo logistics terminals.

- Belo Horizonte

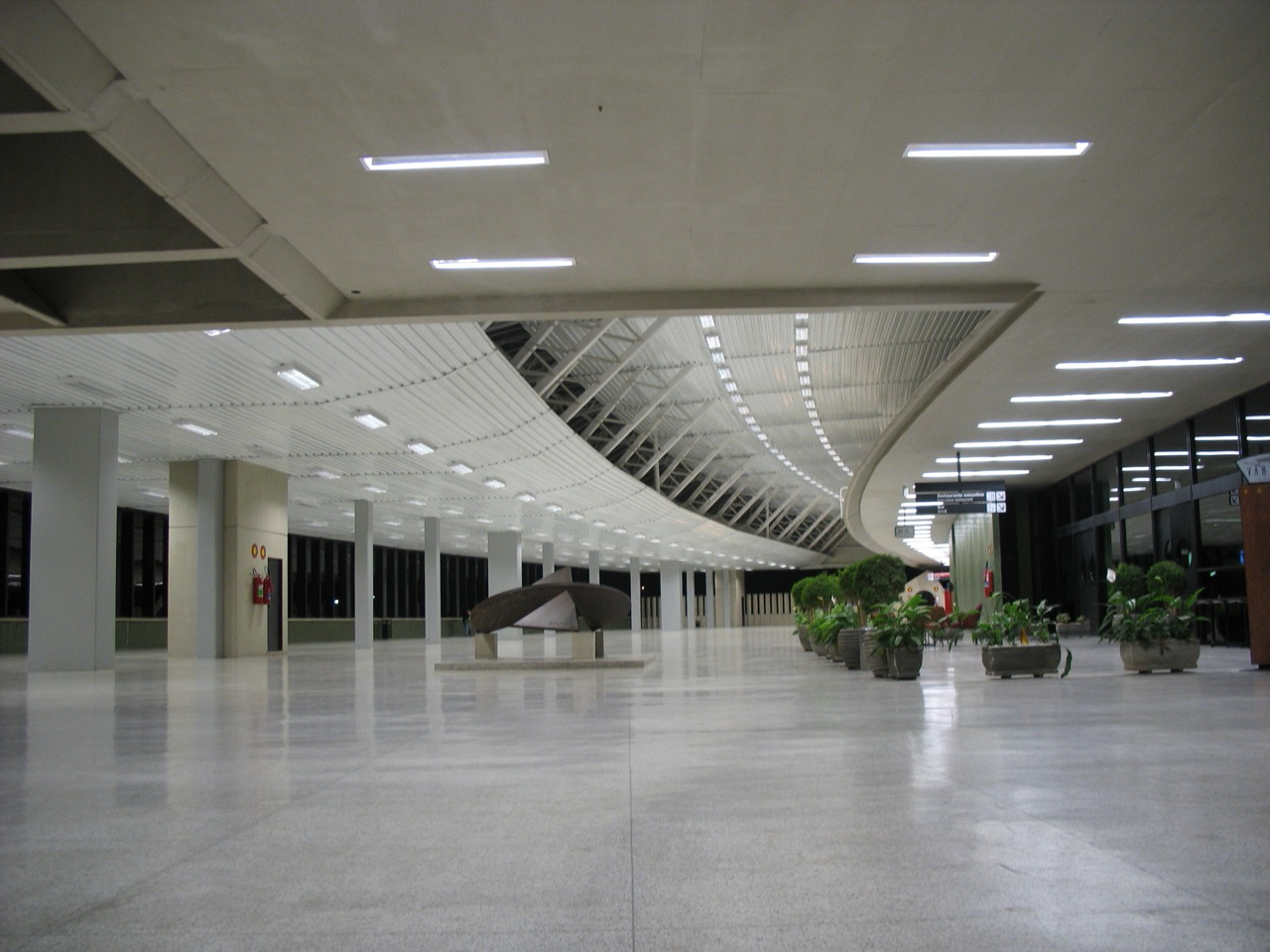
The Confins International Airport in the main hub in Minas Gerais.

Tancredo Neves/Confins International Airport is located in the municipalities of Lagoa Santa and Confins, 38 km from Belo Horizonte, and was opened in January 1984. It was planned from the start for future expansion in steps to meet growing demand. The first step was undertaken with careful concern for the environment, including monitoring by specialized consultants, since the region has a rich archeological heritage. The airport's location is attested to by the fact it has one of the lowest rates of shutdown for bad weather in the country. Confins is certified by the ISO 9001 standard, covering ten processes in the administrative, operational, safety/security and maintenance areas. Starting in March 2005, Confins Airport will receive flights that currently use Pampulha Airport.

=== National Airport ===
- Vitória

Eurico de Aguiar Salles Airport is located on a land plot of just over 5.2 million square meters. Since construction of its first step, finished in 1946, Vitória Airport has undergone several expansions and modernizations, but current demand has surpassed its capacity of 560 thousand passengers a year. The recent construction of new aircraft parking boxes on the aprons has improved the airport's operational efficiency. In 2003 more than 1.2 million passengers used the airport, and in 2004 this rose to some 1.25 million. Vitória is one of the 32 airports in the Infraero network that has a cargo terminal. In May 1999 the first direct international freight connection to the United States (Miami) began operating to Vitória, facilitating imports to the state of Espírito Santo. Today there are five of such flights a week.

=== Highways ===
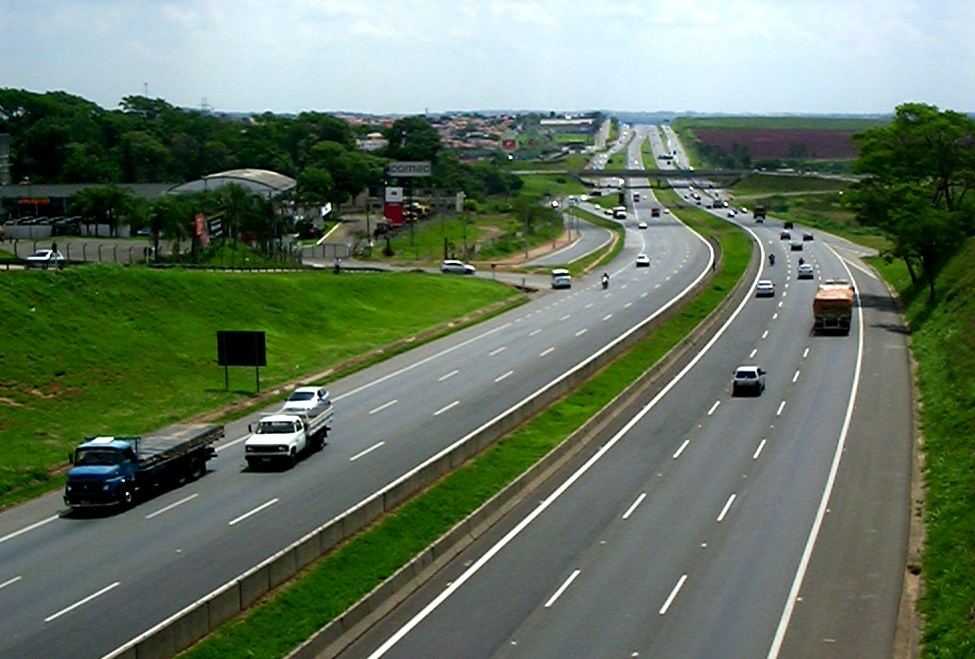
Dom Pedro Highway, part of Campinas Beltway. Photo by Renato M.E. Sabbatini.

The Southeast Brazilian region is highly covered by Paved roads – due to the policy in the Brazil's economy in the 1960s (automobilization of the country) – which led to the car's manufacturing to be a major industry not only in the region but in Brazil as well.

The Southeast's highways are generally in good or very good conditions – some exceptions are made to the southern parts of the BR-101.

Railways are present as well (and also, the region is more covered than any other region), but mainly for freight transport – soy beans and iron ore, mainly, from the farms and mines to the seaports.

Also, a very complicated hydrocanal system is present in the region, with ten major dams.

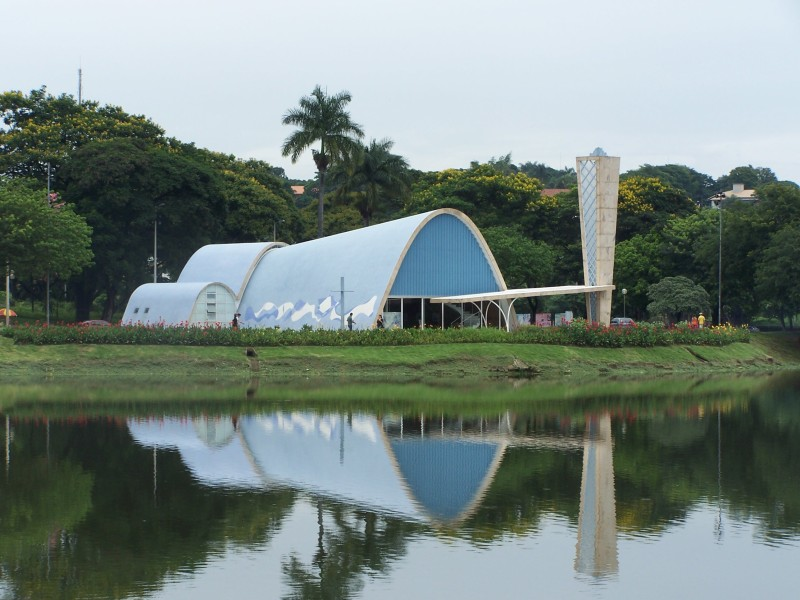
The Pampulha Church in Belo Horizonte is one of the most expressive symbols of the Brazilian Modern Architecture.

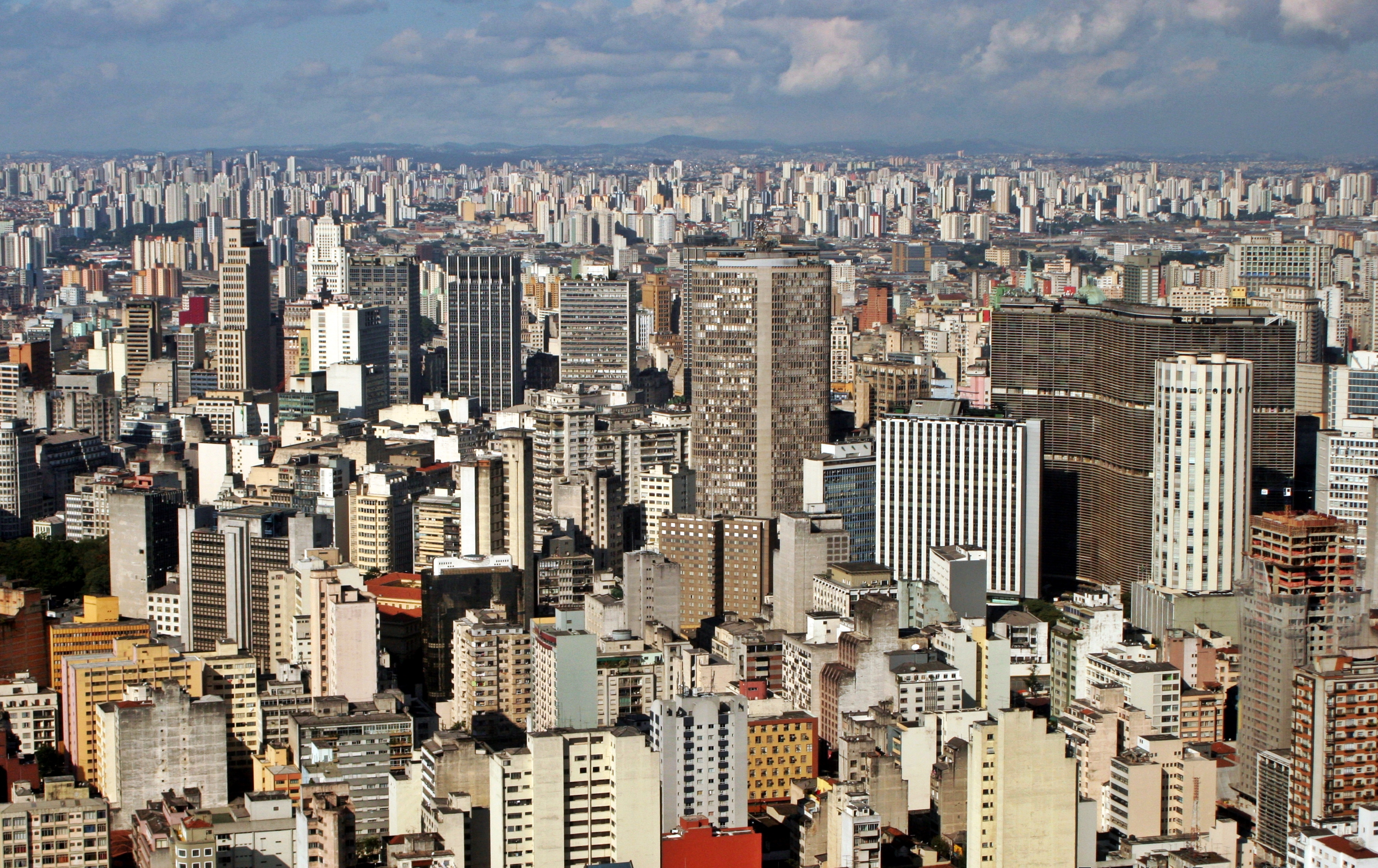
São Paulo is the largest Brazilian city.

Health care and education are of major concern in the larger cities, but in smaller ones, the population are generally well-looked after.
