= Minerva Foods =

Brazilian multinational food company

- Trade name: Minerva S.A.
- Type: Publicly traded company
- Traded as: B3: BEEF3
- Industry: Food
- Genre: Public company
- Founded: 1924
- Founder: Antonio de Pádua Diniz
- Headquarters: Barretos, Brazil
- Number of locations: Worldwide
- Products: Beef production Fresh and frozen meat Bovine-derived products Processed meat Sales of leather and live cattle
- Revenue: ▲ R$ 28.5 billion (2021)
- Operating income: ▲ R$ 2.41 billion (2021)
- Net income: ▼ R$ 599 million (2021)
- Total assets: ▲ R$ 20.7 billion (2021)
- Owner: Vilela de Queiroz Family
- Number of employees: +21,000 (2021)
- Website: www.minervafoods.com

Minerva Foods is a Brazilian food company founded in 1924 in the city of Barretos, São Paulo.

The company is specializes in the trading of fresh beef, leather, derivatives, and the export of live cattle, as well as meat processing.

It is the second-largest beef company in Brazil and Uruguay and the largest beef exporter in Paraguay, Colombia, and Argentina. It sells its products in over 100 countries.

Minerva operates 26 slaughter and deboning plants (11 in Brazil, 3 in Paraguay, 4 in Uruguay, 1 in Colombia, and 5 in Argentina) and 3 processing plants, with a daily capacity to slaughter and debone approximately 54,000 heads of cattle.

== History ==
In 1924, the company originated as the Charqueada Minerva, founded in Barretos, São Paulo, by Antonio de Pádua Diniz. Following Diniz's death in 1925, the business experienced financial difficulties and was offered at auction in 1926. It was subsequently acquired by Antonio Manço Bernardes in partnership with Américo Grilli.

A modernization carried out in 1949 increased slaughtering capacity to 300 head of cattle per day, after which the company adopted the name Matadouro Industrial Minerva (Minerva Industrial Slaughterhouse).

In 1971, the company was renamed Frigorífico Minerva (Minerva Slaughterhouse).

During the 1980s, Frigorífico Minerva faced severe financial problems and ultimately declared bankruptcy. In 1992, the company's bankrupt estate was acquired by the Vilela de Queiroz family, which had longstanding involvement in livestock transportation. Following the acquisition, the business was reestablished as Indústria e Comércio de Carnes Minerva Ltda.

The company's expansion accelerated in the following years. In 1999, Minerva leased and acquired a slaughtering and processing facility in José Bonifácio, São Paulo. A second unit, located in Cajamar, São Paulo, was leased in 2001.

In 2004, Minerva inaugurated a new slaughtering and processing plant in Palmeiras de Goiás, Goiás. Two years later, the company leased another industrial unit in Batayporã, Mato Grosso do Sul.

Expansion continued in 2007. The company began construction of a cooked and frozen meat processing facility in Barretos through a joint venture with the Irish company Dawn Farms. During the same year, it initiated the construction of a new plant in Rolim de Moura, Rondônia, and acquired industrial units in Araguaína, Tocantins, and Redenção, Pará.

In 2008, Minerva acquired the Lord Meat slaughterhouse in Goianésia, Goiás, in a transaction valued at approximately R$60 million.

In 2009, the first Minerva Dawn Farms facility commenced operations. The plant, dedicated to the production of cooked and frozen meat products, was established as a joint venture between Minerva and Dawn Farms Foods. Located adjacent to Minerva's headquarters in Barretos, São Paulo, the 15,400-square-metre facility has the capacity to produce up to 15 tonnes of processed meat per hour.

== Controversies ==
=== Accusation of Purchasing Cattle from Deforested Areas ===
According to NGOs such as Greenpeace and Global Witness, Minerva Foods and other Brazilian meatpacking companies reportedly maintained a scheme throughout the year 2021 to purchase cattle from farms owned by Chaules Volban Pozzebon, the leader of a criminal organization involved in land invasion and extortion, known as the 'largest deforester in Brazil'. Minerva is accused of having bought at least 672 animals from farms implicated in environmental crimes.

In a statement, Minerva Foods stated that they conducted a detailed assessment of each of the 16 mentioned farms and found no alleged violations as claimed by the NGOs. According to the company, three of the mentioned farms were not registered in the company's database, and the remaining 13 fully complied with the sustainability criteria.
