= Pozzobon =

Pozzobon is a surname. Notable people with the surname include:

- Barbara Pozzobon (born 1993), Italian swimmer
- John Pozzobon (1904–1985), Brazilian Roman Catholic deacon

== See also ==
- Pozzebon, surname
