= Chaules Volban Pozzebon =

Brazilian entrepreneur

Chaules Volban Pozzebon (born 1982, Capanema) is a Brazilian entrepreneur and leader of a criminal organization involved in illegal logging and extortion, Pozzebon was identified as the owner of 120 sawmills throughout the Northern region of the country, earning him the nickname 'the largest deforester in Brazil'. He was arrested during the Deforest Operation conducted by the Federal Police, which resulted in his sentence of 99 years in prison.

== Life ==
Chaules was born in Capanema, in Paraná, in 1982. He moved to Ariquemes, in Rondônia, in the early 2000s, and soon entered the lumber industry. He owned several companies in his name, some in partnership with family members, including his mother Maria Salete Pozzebon and his son Igor José Teixeira Pozzebon, while others were maintained by Chaules through 'laranjas' (straw men), such as Djyeison de Oliveira, José Socorro Melo de Castro, and Marcelo Campos Berg, all entrepreneurs who had their own legal issues.

=== Criminal activities ===
Pozzebon was arrested on charges of leading a criminal organization that invaded lands for illegal logging, as well as engaging in extortion schemes targeting settlers and collecting 'tolls' at passages in the region. Along with him, 15 other members of the group were arrested, 11 of whom were military police officers. The accusations against the organization began in Vale do Jamari, where residents complained about an extortion scheme maintained by gunmen, police officers, and businessmen.

The group installed gates at passages in the region where they charged fees that could reach thousands of reais, depending on the type of vehicle, such as trucks and tractors. They also exerted control over a settlement in the region known as 'Soldado da Borracha', where they collected money from settled families awaiting land regularization through agrarian reform, and engaged in acts of intimidation and persecution to seize certain areas. Pozzebon's organization was preparing to permanently expel the families and sell the land in plots to farmers and loggers in the region.

=== Other accusations ===
Pozzebon is accused of other types of crimes, such as using slave labor on his Pedra Preta farm in Cujubim.

== Businesses with meatpacking companies ==
=== JBS S.A. ===
Between 2018 and 2022, the meatpacking company JBS S.A. purchased 8,785 head of cattle from three farms owned by Pozzebon, without the company's alleged monitoring system indicating the problematic nature of the transactions. The company acknowledged the purchases and stated that it was the result of an internal scheme by employees to favor Chaules' farms.

=== Minerva ===
Minerva Foods also conducted business with Pozzebon's farms during 2021, acquiring 672 head of cattle from farms linked to illegal deforestation.
