= Nordeste (disambiguation) =

Nordeste is Portuguese for 'northeast' and may refer to:

== Places ==
=== Brazil ===
- Nordeste, the Northeast Region of Brazil
  - Nordeste (socio-geographic division), a socio-geographic division of this region

=== Portugal ===
- Nordeste (Azores), a municipality on the island of São Miguel

== Other ==
- Nordeste Linhas Aéreas Regionais, an airline based in Salvador, Bahia, Brazil.
- Nordeste (film), a 2005 Argentine film
