= Centro-Sul =

Southern area of Brazil

Geoeconomic Region of Centro-Sul

Centro-Sul (Portuguese pronunciation: [ˌsẽtɾuˈsuw], South-Central) is a geographic area that encompasses the Southeastern, Southern and Central-West regions of Brazil (see Brazil Regional Division), excluding the north of Minas Gerais, most of Mato Grosso, and parts of Tocantins.

== Demographics ==
About 135 million Brazilians live in this region. Most industries are concentrated in the area and are responsible for ~75% of the national GDP. In addition, the majority of the population is predominantly of European descent, and more than half of the population self-identifies as White Brazilian.

The region also is characterized by having a high standard of living (HDI of ~0.787, in average), compared to the rest of the country.

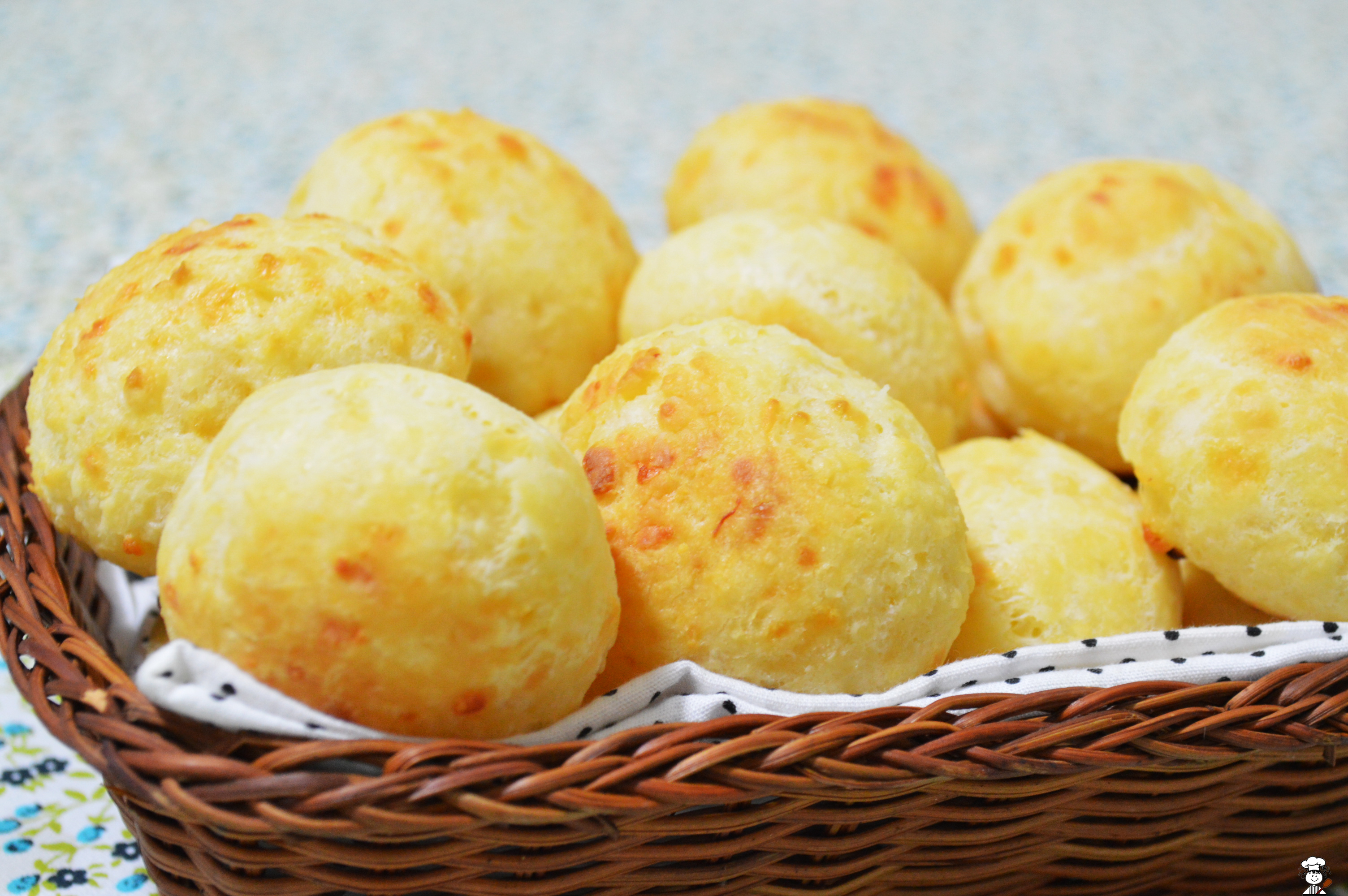
Pão de queijo (Cheese bread) originated in Minas Gerais

The Centro Sul region now has similar development to that of Uruguay and Argentina; the richest South American countries.

== See also ==
- Brazil socio-geographic division

- Amazônia Legal
- Nordeste
