= Amazônia Legal =

Socio-geographic division in Brazil

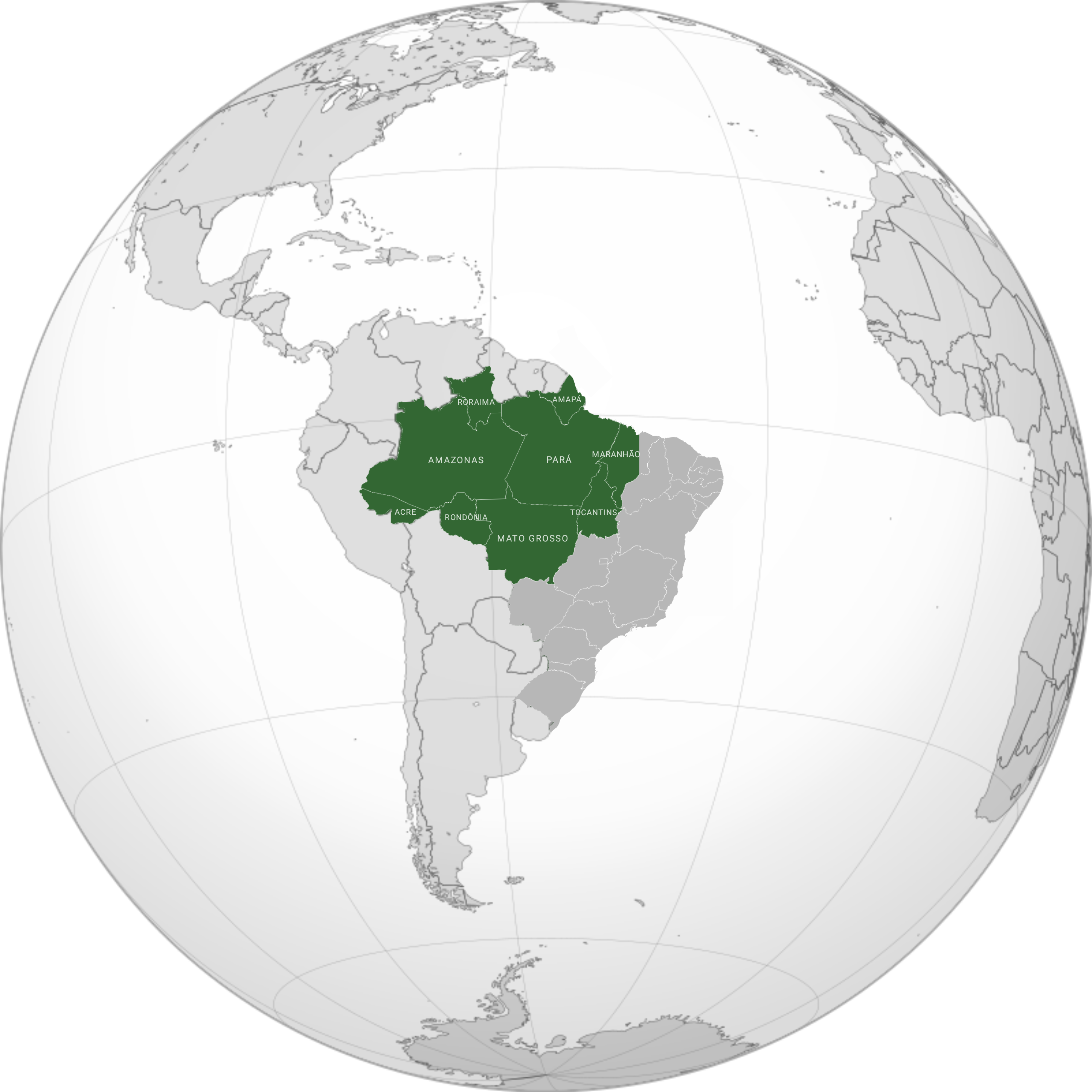
States within Amazônia Legal.

Brazil's Legal Amazon (abbreviated BLA), in Portuguese Amazônia Legal (Brazilian Portuguese: [amaˈzonjɐ leˈɡaw]), is the largest socio-geographic division in Brazil, containing all nine states in the Amazon basin. The government designated this region in 1948 based on its studies on how to plan the economic and social development of the Amazon region.

== Area ==
The official designation Amazônia Legal encompasses all seven Brazilian states of the North Region (Acre, Amapá, Amazonas, Pará, Rondônia, Roraima and Tocantins), as well as most of Mato Grosso in the Center-West Region and the western part of Maranhão in the Northeast Region. Amazônia Legal is a 5,016,136.3 km^{2} region with around 24 million inhabitants; in other words 59% of the geographic territory of Brazil is part of Amazônia Legal, but only 12.34% of the Brazilian population lives there. The administrative unit was initially established by Federal Law No. 5.173 (Art. 2).

Although called Amazônia Legal, the region overlaps three different biomes: all of Brazil's Amazon biome, 37% of the Cerrado biome, and 40% of the Pantanal biome. The main characteristic of the region is the abundant and tropical vegetation, including large sections of rainforest.

The Legal Amazon is divided into two parts: Western Amazon (Amazônia Ocidental, in Portuguese) and Eastern Amazon (Amazônia Oriental, in Portuguese).

Amazônia Ocidental comprises the states of: Acre, Amazonas, Roraima and, Rondônia.

Amazônia Oriental comprises the states of: Pará, Maranhão, Amapá, Tocantins and, Mato Grosso.

== Subdivisions ==
=== The western region ===
The western region corresponding to 44.54% of the territorial extension of the Legal Amazon (72% of the Amazon Forest), most preserved part. It is made up of the Brazilian states of: Amazonas, Acre, Rondônia and, Roraima. The economy of region is based on: agroindustry, fish farming, livestock farming, food industry, plant and mineral extraction, agriculture and ecotourism, in which economy and sustainability go hand in hand.

=== The eastern region ===
The western region is made up of the Brazilian states of: Pará, Maranhão, Amapá, Tocantins and, Mato Grosso. This is also formed by 20% of the cerrado biome and part of the pantanal. Its population is 12.4% of the national population (21,056,532 inhabitants).

== Demographics ==
A total population of 24.7 million inhabitants lives in the area, including more than 300,000 indigenous people belonging to more than 170 ethnicities. Among these are many traditional extractive communities.

Because of its remoteness, this region was the last to be colonized by Brazilians of European descent. It still has a very low population density.

== See also ==
- Brazilian Institute of Environment and Renewable Natural Resources
- Brazil socio-geographic division
  - Centro-Sul
  - Nordeste
- Deforestation in Brazil
- Pantanal jaguar
- Regions of Brazil
