= Brazil socio-geographic division =

1 • Amazonia, 2 • Centro-Sul, 3 • Nordeste.

Brazil can be divided into three socio-geographic divisions – Amazônia Legal, Centro-Sul, and Nordeste – which are distinct from the five officially recognized regions of Brazil. Historically, the different regions of Brazil had their own migratory movements, which resulted in racial differences between these areas. The Southern region had a greater impact of the European immigration and has a large White majority, which contrasts with the Northern and Northeastern regions, which have a large Pardo (mixed-race) majority.

In Northern Brazil, the main racial contribution was of the native Amerindians, with a smaller European and African influence. In Northeastern Brazil, the main contribution was of Africans, with a smaller European and Amerindian influence. In Southeastern Brazil, the main contribution was of Europeans, with a smaller African and Amerindian influence.

== Socio-geographic distinction ==
This does not separate the country by borders of states. The north of Minas Gerais, for example, is in the socio-geographic division of Nordeste, but its southern part is in Centro-Sul.

In the economic, social, historical, cultural, ethnic and geological point of view, this division is much better than the division by Regions. However, it is not very used, mainly because it is unofficial; all official information by IBGE is listed by the criteria of regions. The division by Socio-Geographic similarities is used mainly in universities and private companies, and it is little mentioned at regular school (grades 6–10).

== Regions ==
=== South ===
The South of Brazil is the region with the largest percentage of Whites. According to the 2005 census, people of European ancestry account for 79.6% of the population. In colonial times, this region had a very small population.

The region what is now Southern Brazil was originally settled by Amerindian peoples, mostly Guarani and Kaingangs. Only a few settlers from São Paulo were living there. This situation made the region vulnerable to attacks from neighboring countries. This fact forced the King of Portugal to decide to populate the region. For this, settlers from the Portuguese Azores islands were sent to the coast.

To stimulate the immigration to Brazil, the king offered several benefits for the Azorean couples. Between 1748 and 1756, six thousand Portuguese from the Azores moved to the coast of Santa Catarina. They were mainly newly married who were seeking a better life. At that time, the Azores were one of the poorest regions of Portugal. They established themselves mainly in the Santa Catarina Island, nowadays the region of Florianópolis. Later, some couples moved to Rio Grande do Sul, where they established Porto Alegre, the capital. The Azoreans lived on fishing and agriculture, especially flour. They composed over half of Rio Grande do Sul and Santa Catarina's population in the late 18th century. The state of Paraná was settled by colonists from São Paulo due to their proximity (Paraná was part of São Paulo until the mid-19th century).

With the development of cattle in the interior of Rio Grande do Sul, enslaved Africans began arriving in large numbers. By 1822, Blacks were 50% of Rio Grande do Sul's population. This number decreased to 25% in 1858 and to only 5.2% in 2005. Most of them came from Angola.

After independence from Portugal (1822) the Brazilian government started to stimulate the arrival of a new wave of immigrants to settle the South. In 1824 they established São Leopoldo, a German community. Major Schaeffer, a German who was living in Brazil, was sent to Germany in order to bring immigrants. From Rhineland-Palatinate, the Major brought the immigrants and soldiers. Settlers from Germany were brought to work as small farmers, because there were many land holdings without workers.

To attract the immigrants, the Brazilian government had promised large tracts of land, where they could settle with their families and colonize the region. The first years were not easy. Many Germans died of tropical disease, while others left the colonies to find better living conditions. The German colony of São Leopoldo was a disaster. Nevertheless, in the following years, a further 4,830 Germans arrived at São Leopoldo, and then the colony started to develop, with the immigrants establishing the town of Novo Hamburgo (New Hamburg).

From São Leopoldo and Novo Hamburgo, the German immigrants spread into others areas of Rio Grande do Sul, mainly close to sources of rivers. The whole region of Vale dos Sinos was populated by Germans. During the 1830s and part of the 1840s German immigration to Brazil was interrupted due to conflicts in the country (Ragamuffin War). The immigration restarted after 1845 with the creation of new colonies. The most important ones were Blumenau, in 1850, and Joinville in 1851, both in Santa Catarina state; these attracted thousands of German immigrants to the region. In the next five decades, other 28 thousand Germans were brought to Rio Grande do Sul to work as small farmers in the countryside. Until 1914, it is estimated that 50 thousand Germans settled in this state.

Another immigration boom to this region started in 1875. Communities with Italian immigrants were also created in southern Brazil. The first colonies to be populated by Italians were created in the highlands of Rio Grande do Sul (Serra Gaúcha). These were Garibaldi and Bento Gonçalves. These immigrants were predominantly from Veneto, in northern Italy. After five years, in 1880, the great numbers of Italian immigrants arriving caused the Brazilian government to create another Italian colony, Caxias do Sul. After initially settling in the government-promoted colonies, many of the Italian immigrants spread themselves into other areas of Rio Grande do Sul seeking further opportunities.

They created many other Italian colonies on their own, mainly in highlands, because the lowlands were already populated by Germans and native gaúchos. The Italian established many vineyards in the region. Nowadays, the wine produced in these areas of Italian colonization in southern Brazil is much appreciated within the country, though little is available for export. In 1875, the first Italian colonies were established in Santa Catarina, which lies immediately to the north of Rio Grande do Sul. The colonies gave rise to towns such as Criciúma, and later also spread further north, to Paraná.

A significant number of Poles have settled in Southern Brazil. The first immigrants arrived in 1869 and until 1959, it is estimated that over 100,000 Poles migrated to Brazil, 95% of whom were peasants. The State of Paraná received the majority of Polish immigrants, who settled mainly in the region of Curitiba, in the towns of Mallet, Cruz Machado, São Matheus do Sul, Irati, and União da Vitória. Russians and Ukrainians are present as well.

=== Southeast ===
The Southeastern region of Brazil is the ethnically most diverse part of the country. Whites make up 58.8% of its population, and those of mixed-race and African descent make up, together, 40.2%. It has the largest percentage of Asian Brazilians, composing 0.8%, and small Amerindian community (0.2%).

Southeast Brazil is home to the oldest Portuguese village in the Americas, São Vicente, São Paulo, established in 1532. The region, since the beginning of its colonization, is a melting pot of Whites, Indians and Blacks. The Amerindians of the region were enslaved by the Portuguese. The race mixing between the Indian women and their White masters produced the Bandeirante, the colonial inhabitant of São Paulo, who formed expeditions that crossed the interior of Brazil and greatly increased the Portuguese colonial territory. The main language spoken by these people of mixed Indian/Portuguese heritage was Língua geral, a language that mixed Tupi and Portuguese words.

In the late 17th century the Bandeirantes found gold in the area that nowadays is Minas Gerais. A gold rush took place in Brazil, and thousands of Portuguese colonists arrived during this period. The confrontation between the Bandeirantes and the Portuguese for obtaining possession of the mines led to the Emboabas' War. The Portuguese won the war. The Amerindian culture declined, giving space to a stronger Portuguese cultural domination. In order to control the richness, the Portuguese Crown moved the capital of Brazil from Salvador, Bahia to Rio de Janeiro. Thousands of African slaves were brought to work in the gold mines. They were landed in Rio de Janeiro and sent to other regions. By the late 18th century, Rio de Janeiro was an "African city": most of its inhabitants were slaves. No other place in the world had so many slaves, since the end of the Roman Empire. In 1808 the Portuguese royal family, fleeing from Napoleon, took charge in Rio de Janeiro. Some 15 thousand Portuguese nobles moved to Brazil. The region changed a lot, becoming more European.

After independence and principally after 1850, Southeast Brazil was "inundated" by European immigrants, who were attracted by the government to replace the African slaves in the coffee plantations. Most immigrants landed in the Port of Santos and have been forwarded to the coffee farms within São Paulo. The vast majority of the immigrants came from Italy. Brazil attracted nearly 5 million immigrants between 1870 and 1953. A large numbers of Italians are apparent in many parts of Southeast Brazil. Their descendants are nowadays predominant in many areas. Northeast São Paulo is 65% Italian, for example.

The arrival of immigrants from several places of Europe, the Middle-East and Asia produced an ethnically diverse population. The city of Bastos, in São Paulo, is 11.4% Japanese. The city of São Paulo is home to the largest Japanese population outside Japan itself.

=== Northeast ===
The population of Northeast Brazil is a result of an intensive race mixing, which has occurred in the region for more than four centuries. According to the 2006 census people reported as "brown" make up 62.5% of the population. Those reported as Black account for 7.8%.

This region did not have much effect from the massive European immigration that took place in Southern Brazil in the late 19th century and first decades of the 20th century. The Northeast has been a poorer region of Brazil since the decline of sugar cane plantations in the late 17th century, so its economy did not require immigrants.

The ethnic composition of the population starts in the 16th century. The Portuguese settlers rarely brought women, which led to relationships with the Indian women. Later, interracial relationships occurred between Portuguese and African women. The coast, in the past the place where millions of Black slaves arrived (mostly from modern-day Angola, Ghana, Nigeria and Benin) to work in sugar-cane plantations, is where nowadays there is a predominance of Mulattoes, those of Black and White ancestry. Salvador, Bahia is considered the largest Black city outside of Africa, with over 80% of its inhabitants being African-Brazilians. In the interior, there is a predominance of Indian and White mixture.

=== North ===
Northern Brazil, largely covered by the Amazon rainforest, is the Brazilian region with the largest Amerindian influences, both in culture and ethnicity. Inhabited by diverse indigenous tribes, this part of Brazil was reached by Portuguese and Spanish colonists in the 17th century, but it started to be populated by non-Indians only in the late 19th and early 20th centuries. The exploitation of rubber used in the growing industries of automobiles, has emerged a huge migration to the region.

Many people from the poor Northeast Brazil, mostly Ceará, moved to the Amazon area. The contact between the Indians and the northeastern rubbers created the base of the ethnic composition of the region, with its mixed-race majority.

=== Central-West ===
The Central-West Region of Brazil was inhabited by diverse Indians when the Portuguese arrived in the early 18th century. The Portuguese came to explore the precious stones that were found there. Contact between the Portuguese and the Indians created a mixed-race population. Until the mid-20th century, Central-West Brazil had a very small population. The situation changed with the construction of Brasília, the new capital of Brazil, in 1960. Many workers were attracted to the region, mostly from northeastern Brazil.

A new wave of settlers started arriving from the 1970s. With the mechanization of agriculture in the South of Brazil, many rural workers of German and Italian origin migrated to Central-West Brazil. In some areas, they are already the majority of the population.

== See also ==
- Brazilian states by Human Development Index
- Demographics of Brazil
- Race in Brazil
- Regions of Brazil
