= Northeast Region, Brazil =

Northeast Region Região Nordeste
- Region
- Coordinates: 12°58′S 38°31′W
- Country: Brazil
- Largest cities: Recife (by metro pop.) Salvador (by city proper); Fortaleza (by pop. density)
- States: List: Alagoas; Bahia; Ceará; Maranhão; Paraíba; Pernambuco; Piauí; Rio Grande do Norte; Sergipe

Area
  - Region: 1,558,196 km^{2} (601,623 sq mi)
  - Rank: 3rd

Population (2022)
  - Region: 54,658,515
  - Rank: 2nd
  - Density: 35.07807/km^{2} (90.85180/sq mi)
  - Rank: 3rd
  - Urban: 71%

GDP
  - Total: R$ 1.243 trillion (US$ 230.596 billion)

HDI
  - Year: 2014
  - Category: 0.710 – high (5th)
  - Life expectancy: 69 years (5th)
  - Infant mortality: 33.2 per 1,000 (1st)
  - Literacy: 85,8% (5th)
- Time zones: UTC−02:00 (FNT)
- UTC−03:00 (BRT)

The Northeast Region of Brazil (Portuguese: Região Nordeste do Brasil [ʁeʒiˈɐ̃w nɔʁˈdɛstʃi du bɾaˈziw]) is one of the five official and political regions of the country according to the Brazilian Institute of Geography and Statistics. Of Brazil's twenty-six states, it comprises nine: Maranhão, Piauí, Ceará, Rio Grande do Norte, Paraíba, Pernambuco, Alagoas, Sergipe and Bahia, along with the Fernando de Noronha archipelago (formerly a separate territory, now part of Pernambuco).

Chiefly known as Nordeste ("Northeast") in Brazil, this region was the first to be colonized by the Portuguese and other European peoples, playing a crucial role in the country's history. Nordeste's dialects and rich culture, including its folklore, cuisines, music and literature, became the most easily distinguishable across the country. To this day, Nordeste is known for its history and culture, as well as for its natural environment and its hot weather.

Nordeste stretches from the Atlantic seaboard in the northeast and southeast, northwest and west to the Amazon Basin and south through the Espinhaço highlands in southern Bahia. It encloses the São Francisco River and drainage basin, which were instrumental in the exploration, settlement and economic development of the region. The region lies entirely within the earth's tropical zone and encompasses Caatinga, Atlantic Forest and part of the Cerrado ecoregions. The climate is hot and semi-arid, varying from xeric in Caatinga, to mesic in Cerrado and hydric in the Atlantic Forest. The Northeast Region represents 18% of Brazilian territory, has a population of 57 million people, 28% of the total population of the country, and contributes 14.2% (2020) of Brazil's GDP. Nearly three quarters of the population live in urban areas clustered along the Atlantic coast and about 15 million people live in the hinterland. It is an impoverished region: 43.5% of the population lives in poverty, defined as less than $2/day.

The capital of each state including the states of Salvador, Recife, Fortaleza and São Luís is its largest city; those four capitals are coastal cities with a population of more than one million. Nordeste has nine international airports, (Note: AJU Santa Maria Airport (Sergipe), Aracaju, Sergipe; MCZ Zumbi dos Palmares International Airport, Maceió, Alagoas; PHB Parnaíba-Prefeito Dr. João Silva Filho International Airport Parnaíba, Piauí; SLZ Marechal Cunha Machado International Airport, São Luís, Maranhão; NAT Augusto Severo International Airport, Natal, Rio Grande do Norte; FOR Pinto Martins International Airport, Fortaleza, Ceará; JPA Presidente Castro Pinto International Airport, João Pessoa, Paraíba, REC Guararapes International Airport, Recife, Pernambuco; SSA Deputado Luís Eduardo Magalhães International Airport, Salvador, Bahia) and the region has the second largest number of passengers (roughly 20%) in Brazil.

== Geography ==
Geoclimatic subregions of Brazilian Northeast: 1 • Meio-Norte 2 • Sertão 3 • Agreste 4 • Zona da Mata

=== Zona da Mata ("Forest Zone") ===
The Zona da Mata comprises the rainforest zones of Nordeste (part of the Atlantic Forest or Mata Atlântica) in the humid eastern coast, where the region's largest capital cities are also located. The forest area was much larger before suffering from centuries of deforestation and exploration. For many years, sugar cane cultivation in this region was the mainstay of Brazil's economy, being superseded only when coffee production developed in the late 19th century. Sugar cane is cultivated on large estates whose owners maintain tremendous political influence.

=== Agreste ===
Since the escarpment does not generate any further rainfall on its slopes from the lifting of the trade winds, annual rainfall decreases steadily inland. After a relatively short distance, there is no longer enough rainfall to support tropical rainforest, especially since the rainfall is extremely erratic from year to year. This transitional zone is known as the agreste and because it is located on the steep escarpment, was not generally used whilst flatter land was abundant. Today, with irrigation water available, however, the agreste, as its name suggest, is a major farming region. Despite containing no major city, it contains well developed medium large cities such as Caruaru, Campina Grande and Arapiraca.

=== Sertão ("Backlands") ===
In Portuguese, the word sertão (Portuguese pronunciation: [seʁˈtɐ̃w], meaning "backcountry" or "outback") first referred to the vast hinterlands of Asia and South America that Lusitanian explorers encountered. In Brazil, the geographical term referred to backlands away from the Atlantic coastal regions where the Portuguese first settled in South America in the early sixteenth century.

Geographically, the Sertão consists mainly of low uplands that form part of the Brazilian Highlands. Most parts of the sertão are between 200 and 500 meters above sea level, with higher elevations found on the eastern edge in the Planalto da Borborema, where it merges into a sub-humid region known as agreste, in the Serra da Ibiapaba in western Ceará and in the Serro do Periquito of central Pernambuco. In the north, the Sertão extends to the northern coastal plains of Rio Grande do Norte state, whilst in the south it fades out in the northern fringe of Minas Gerais.

Because the Sertão lies close to the equator, temperatures remain nearly uniform throughout the year and are typically tropical, often extremely hot in the west. However, the sertão is distinctive in its low rainfall compared to other areas of Brazil. Because of the relatively cool temperatures in the South Atlantic Ocean, the Intertropical Convergence Zone remains north of the region for most of the year. Consequently, conditions are very dry for most of the year.

Although annual rainfall averages between 500 and 800 millimeters over most of the sertão and 1300 millimeters on the northern coast of Fortaleza, it is confined to a short rainy season. This season extends from January to April in the west, but in the eastern Sertão it generally occurs from March to June. However, rainfall is extremely erratic and in some years the rains are minimal, leading to catastrophic drought. The duration of droughts has increased over the last 36 years, with the 2012–2016 drought being the longest drought in the region's history. Because of this vulnerability to the climate, Sertão is also known as a "polygon of drought". Due to global warming, more frequent, more severe and longer droughts are estimated to hit the region over the next 90 years. Despite the increasing severity of the droughts, Brazil has become increasingly able to mitigate the negative social impacts associated with drought.

While generally successful in helping those enduring drought, drought relief programs have historically resulted in a so-called indústria da seca (drought industry). The term, coined by Antônio Callado, describes the phenomenon wherein local politicians use droughts as a tool to increase their electoral chances, effectively "trading drought relief for votes." This misappropriation of funds often benefits the wealthy—especially private landowners—to the detriment of the rural poor.

=== Meio-Norte ("Midnorth") ===
Meio-Norte is a transition area between the high rainfalls region of Amazon rainforest and the semi arid region of Sertão (hot and drought) covering the state of Maranhão and half of Piauí.

== Hydrology ==
The Northeast region comprises the drainage basins of the São Francisco, Canindé, and Parnaíba Rivers.

== Geology and topography ==
Geographically, Nordeste consists chiefly of an eroded continental craton with many low hills and small ranges. The highest peaks are around 1,850 metres (6,070 ft) in Bahia, while further north there are no peaks above 1,123 metres (3,684 ft). On its northern and western side, the plateaus fall steadily to the coast and into the basin of the Tocantins River in Maranhão, but on the eastern side it falls off quite sharply to the coast except in the valley of the São Francisco river. The steep slopes and long cliffs of the eastern coastline are known as "The Great Escarpment".

The escarpment serves an extremely important climatic function because for most of the year, Nordeste is out of reach of the Intertropical Convergence Zone. The easterly trade winds blow across the region and bring abundant rainfall to the coast but producing clear, dry conditions inland where the escarpment blocks moisture flow. This gives rise to four distinct regions, the zona da mata on the coast, the agreste on the escarpment, sertão beyond and the Mid north.

== History ==
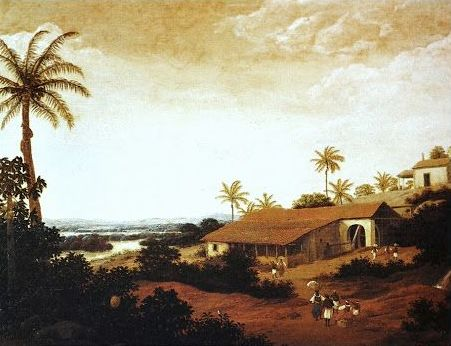
View of a sugar-producing farm (engenho) in colonial Pernambuco by Dutch painter Frans Post (17th century).

Before the arrival of Europeans, Nordeste was inhabited by indigenous peoples, mostly speaking languages of the Tupi–Guarani family. In the Sertão region, Tapuia tribes could also be found. It was the first area of Brazil to be colonized when roughly 1,500 Portuguese arrived on April 22, 1500, under the command of Pedro Álvares Cabral at Porto Seguro, in what is now the state of Bahia.

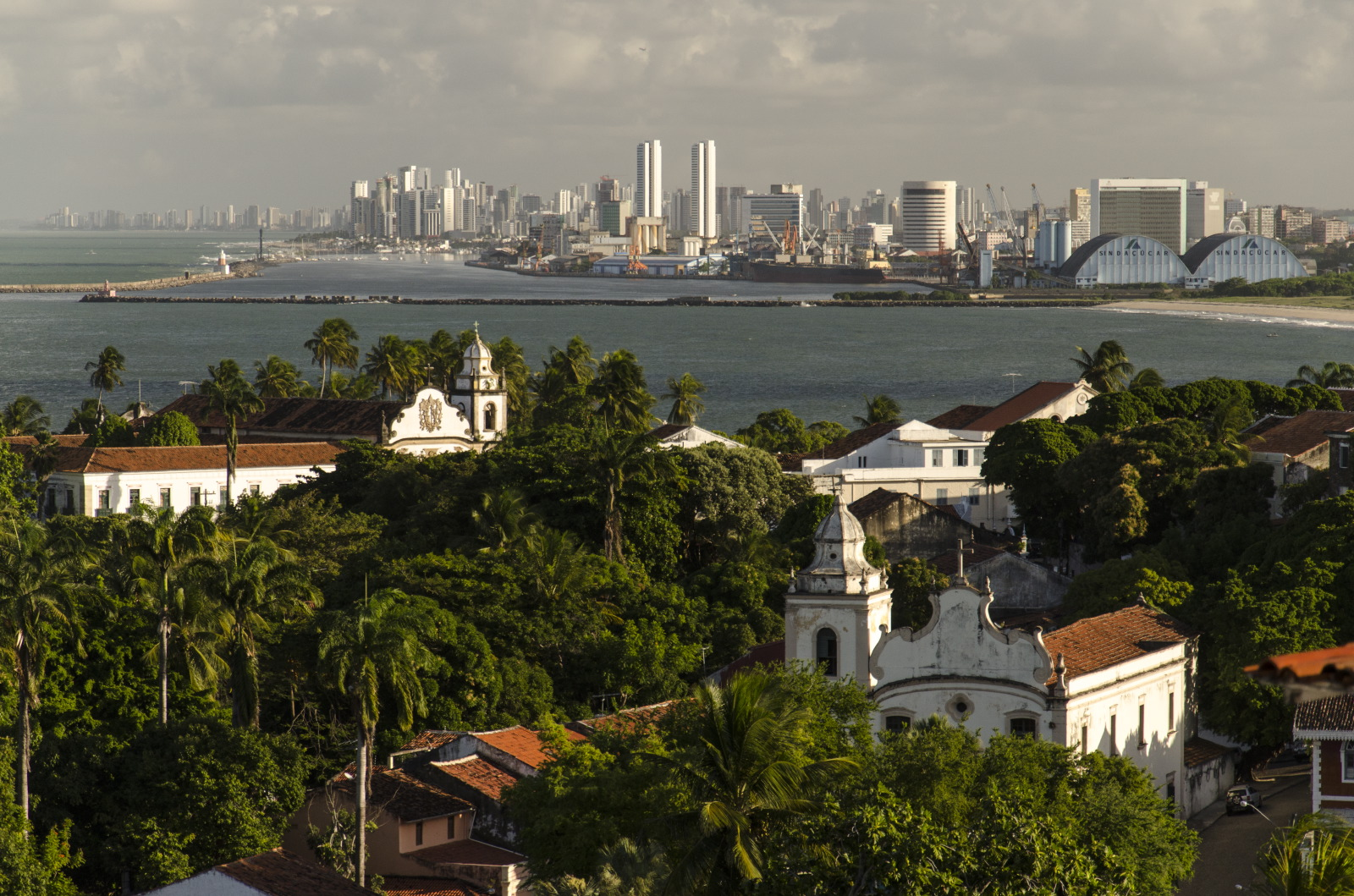
Olinda with Recife in the background. Olinda was declared a UNESCO World Heritage Site in 1982.

The coast of Nordeste saw the first economic activity of the country, namely the extraction and export of pau Brasil, or brazilwood. Indigenous peoples helped Europeans with the extraction of brazilwood in exchange for spices. They also engaged in an exchange of goods (Portuguese: escambo), trading things like animal skins for knives and other valuables. Brazilwood was highly valued in Europe where it was used to make violin bows (especially the Pau de Pernambuco variety) and for the red dye it produced. Countries like France, which disagreed with the Treaty of Tordesillas (a papal bull decreed by the Spanish-born Pope Alexander VI in 1493 which sought to divide South America between the Spanish and the Portuguese), launched many attacks on the coast to steal the wood.

Soon after their arrival, Portuguese settlers began to displace native peoples and enslave them as field laborers, leading to conflicts in which many natives died. These conflicts were one contributor to the decline of the indigenous population, which intensified as colonization, commercial interest, and disease escalated in the region. After resistance from indigenous peoples and opposition to their enslavement from the Jesuits, the Portuguese colonials began importing black African slaves in 1530, largely to Bahia.

In 1552, the seat of the first Catholic bishop of Brazil was established in Nordeste.

French colonists not only tried to settle in present-day Rio de Janeiro, from 1555 to 1567 (the so-called France Antarctique episode), but also in present-day São Luís, from 1612 to 1614 (the so-called France Equinoxiale). The Dutch, also opposed to the Treaty of Tordesillas, plundered Nordeste's coast, sacked Bahia in 1604, and even temporarily captured Salvador, which had been Brazil's first capital and general seat of government since 1549. However, the Portuguese soon regained control of Salvador, and the Dutch were unable to recapture it, despite repeated attempts.

In 1630, the Dutch captured Pernambuco and made Recife (Dutch: Mauritsstad) their capital. By 1640, they had set up more permanently in Nordeste and controlled a long stretch of coast that was most accessible to Europe without, however, penetrating the interior. The colonists of the Dutch West India Company (WIC) in Brazil were under constant siege despite the presence in Recife of John Maurice of Nassau as governor. To help fight the Portuguese, the WIC sought the support of native peoples. By 1635, the majority of Tupi, mostly from Rio Grande do Norte and Paraíba, had given their support to the Dutch, as they viewed the Portuguese as more brutal and believed that they would be better off if the Dutch remained in Brazil. The military aid provided by the Tupi population proved to be useful in 1645, when Portuguese colonists who had remained in Dutch-controlled territory began to revolt. Tupi mediators such as Poty and Paraupaba were instrumental in maintaining strong Dutch-Tupi relations during the struggle against the Portuguese. At the end of 1653, the Portuguese succeeded in capturing Recife, effectively ending Dutch Brazil and culminating in their surrender in 1654.

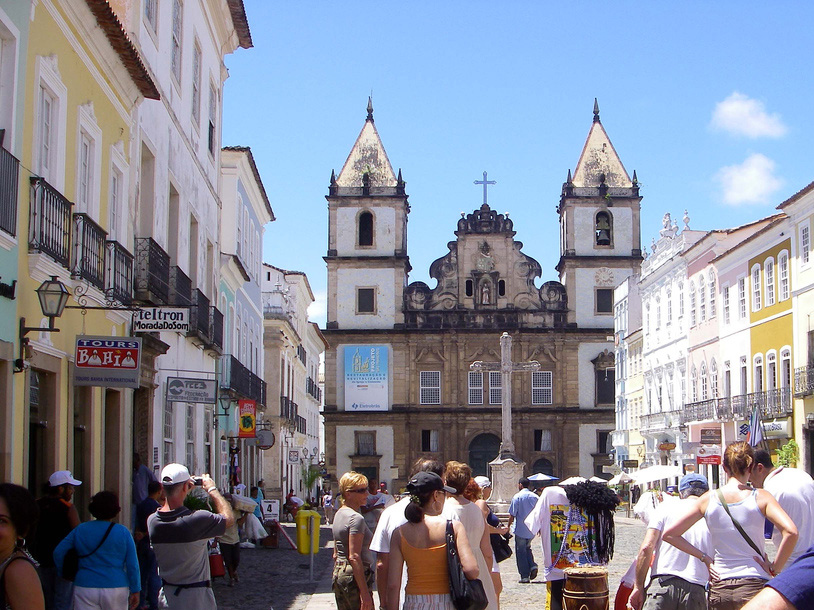
The historic centre of Salvador, Bahia, was declared a UNESCO World Heritage Site in 1985.

Slave resistance began during the colonial era, in the 17th century, and eventually led to the formation of quilombos, or settlements of runaway and free-born African slaves. The Quilombo dos Palmares, the largest and most well-known of these settlements, was founded around 1600 in the Serra da Barriga hills, in the present state of Alagoas. Palmares, at the height of its power, was an independent, self-sustaining republic, hosting a population of over 30,000 free African men, women and children. There were over 200 buildings in the community, a church, four smithies, and a council house. Although Palmares managed to defend itself from the Dutch military and the Portuguese colonials for several decades, it was finally taken and destroyed and its leader Zumbi dos Palmares was captured and beheaded. His head was then displayed in a public plaza in Recife.

Although the king of Portugal had abolished the enslavement of native peoples in 1570, it continued until the Marquis of Pombal declared them to be 'free men' in 1755. However, by that time the practice was already rare. Salvador remained the colonial capital until 1763 when it was succeeded by Rio de Janeiro, the new economic power center of that era. In 1850, the Eusébio de Queirós Law was passed, abolishing the international slave trade in Brazil. Following the ban, some slaves from Nordeste were sold to the Southeast region of Brazil (Portuguese: Sudeste), primarily to the state of Rio de Janeiro. The percentage of slaves in Salvador dropped from 41.6% of the population in 1775 to 27.5% in 1855.

Between 1877 and 1879, a large part of the sertão was hit by the most severe drought in Brazilian history, known as the Great Drought, with Ceará being the hardest hit region. As a result, thousands of Nordestinos migrated to other parts of Brazil, especially to the Amazon, and about 200,000 people died. Before the rise of Sudeste, Nordeste was the center of the African slave trade in Brazil, the center of the sugar industry in Brazil, and Brazil's main seaport.

=== Republic ===
During the Old Republic, the interior of the Northeast was under the dominion of local oligarchs called coronéis, who enforced their power through violence and fear. Two notable examples of responses to this oppression were the messianic community of Canudos, in the interior of Bahia, which was destroyed in the War of Canudos (1896–1897), and the Cangaceiros in the 1930s.

=== Industrialization ===
During the administration of Juscelino Kubitschek (1956–61), the Superintendency for the Development of the Northeast, or Sudene, was created with the goal of promoting the development of the Northeast region. In the following decades, under the Populist Republic and the military dictatorship, the investments made by Sudene catalyzed a process of industrialization around Salvador, Fortaleza, and Recife, as well as a burgeoning agriculture industry around the São Francisco river.

== Political subdivisions ==
The regions of Brazil do not have their own governmental or administrative bodies, but they are well defined. (Note: by the Instituto Brasileiro de Geografia e Estatística (IBGE), an agency of the Brazilian federal administration) Their boundaries and constituent states are part of the recognized geopolitical structure of the country. The Northeast Region is composed of nine states, with 1793 municipalities (Note: The 1988 Brazilian Constitution treats the municipalities as parts of the Federation and not simply dependent subdivisions of the states.) and two special municipalities, Saint Peter and Saint Paul Archipelago and Fernando de Noronha Archipelago; there are no unincorporated areas. Brazilian states are divided into Mesoregions, and Mesoregions into Microregions, each region representing a group of municipalities. These regions were created by the Brazilian Institute of Geography and Statistics for statistical purposes and do not, therefore, constitute an administrative area. Municipalities are analogous to counties in states of the United States; a city is the urban area of the municipality, and always has the same name as the municipality.

A municipality may include cities other than the one which gives it its name. The largest state of the Northeast region in terms of area, population and economic output is Bahia; its capital Salvador is the largest city of Nordeste.

State	Symbol	Area km^{2}	Municipalities	Population 2014 IBGE	HDI 2010	HDI 2018	GDP (R$x1000) 2014 IBGE	GDP per capita 2014 (R$)
Alagoas	AL	27,768	102	3,327,551	0.631	0.719	40,975,000	12.335,44
Bahia	BA	564,693	417	15,150,143	0.660	0.735	223,930,000	14.803,95
Ceará	CE	148,826	184	8,867,448	0.682	0.734	126,054,000	14.255,05
Maranhão	MA	331,983	217	6,861,924	0.639	0.706	76,842,000	11.216,37
Paraíba	PB	56,440	223	3,950,359	0.658	0.736	52,936,000	13.422,42
Pernambuco	PE	98,312	185	9,297,861	0.673	0.737	155,143,000	16.722,05
Piauí	PI	251,529	223	3,198,185	0.646	0.716	37,723,000	11.808,08
Rio Grande do Norte	RN	52,797	167	3,419,550	0.684	0.751	54,023,000	15.849,33
Sergipe	SE	21,910	75	2,227,294	0.665	0.747	37,472,000	16.882,71
Northeast	NE	1,558,196	1,793	56,300,315	0.659	0.731	805,099,000	14.329,13

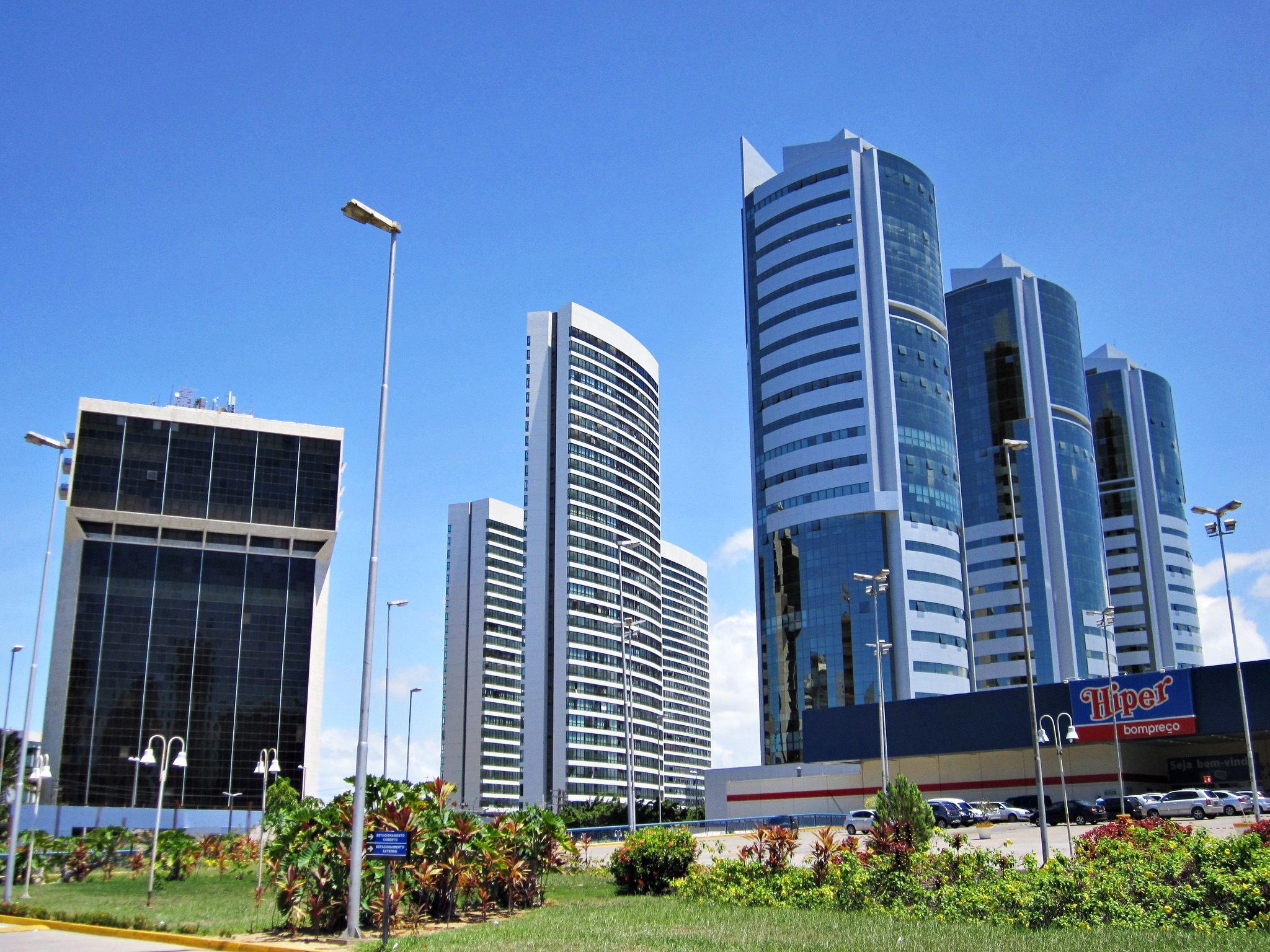
Recife is the largest metropolitan area of the Northeast Region, and the third largest city of the region.

Metropolitan area	Population (2010 census)
Recife	3,690,547
Fortaleza	3,615,767
Salvador	3,573,973
Natal	1,351,004
São Luís	1,331,181
João Pessoa	1,198,576
Maceió	1,156,364
Teresina	1,150,959
Aracaju	835,816

== Economy ==
In 2016, the Northeast was in 3rd place among the 5 regions of Brazil, in terms of total wealth. The Southeast comes in 1st with 53.1% of GDP, the South in 2nd with 17%, Northeast in 3rd with 14.4% and the Center-West in 4th with 10.2%. In GDP per capita (that is, GDP per inhabitant), it is in 4th place among the 5 regions, behind the Midwest, South and Southeast. None of the states in the Northeast Region of Brazil has a percentage of GDP production above its percentage of inhabitants in the country, therefore, being in deficit – with this, the Federal Government of Brazil is obliged to redirect taxes extracted in the Southeast and South to the Northeast Region.

=== Agriculture ===
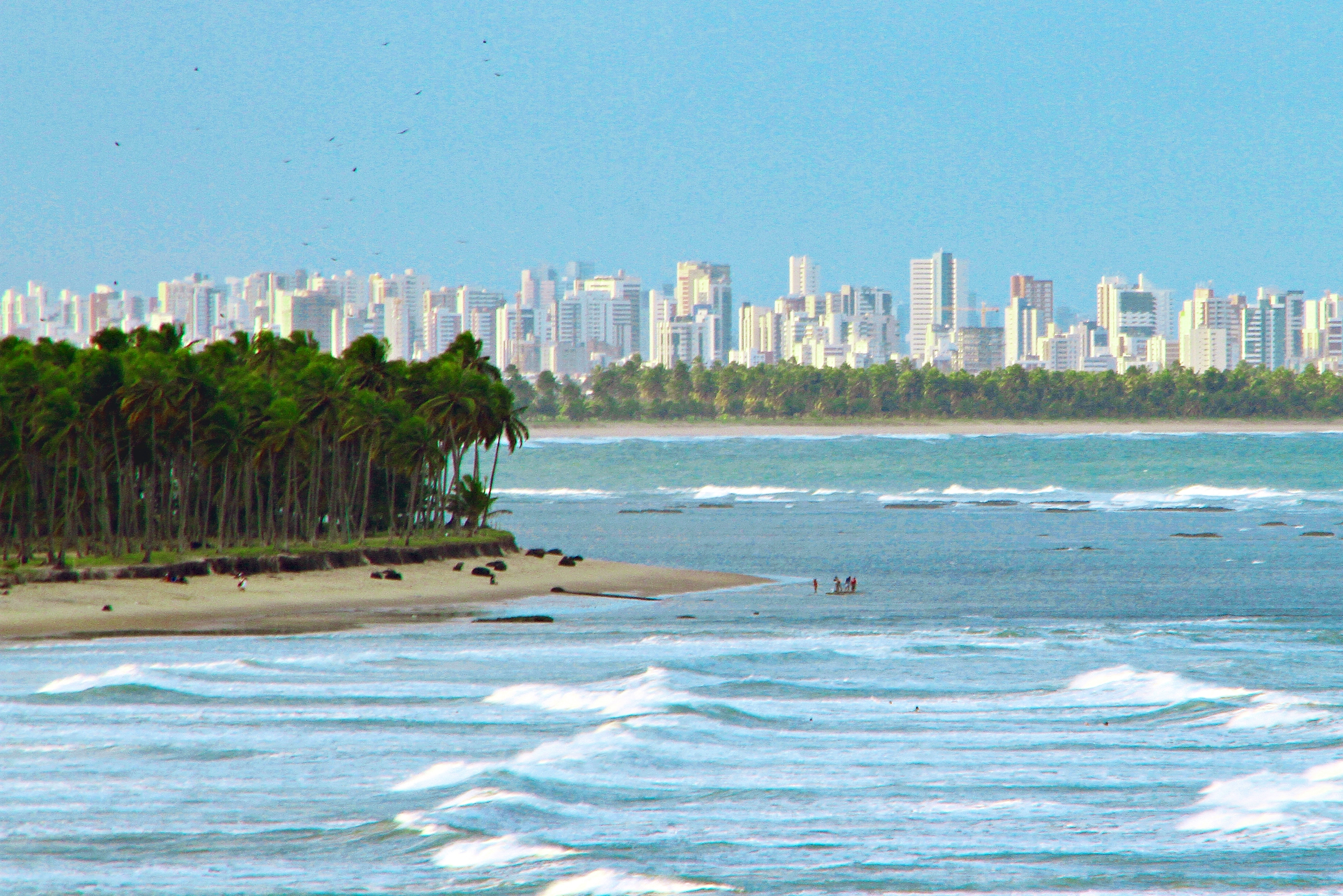
Coconut trees in Pernambuco

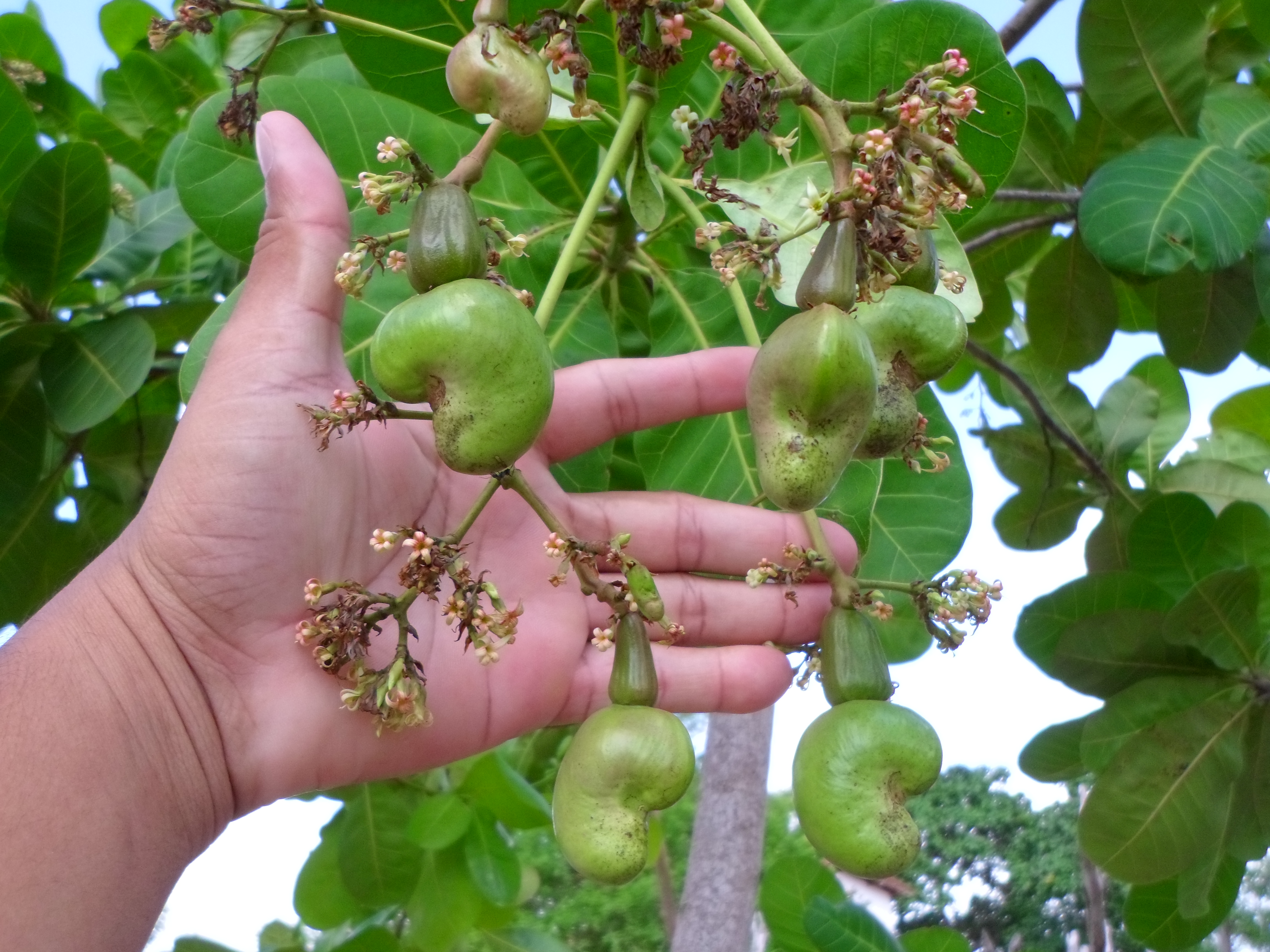
Cashew in Ceará

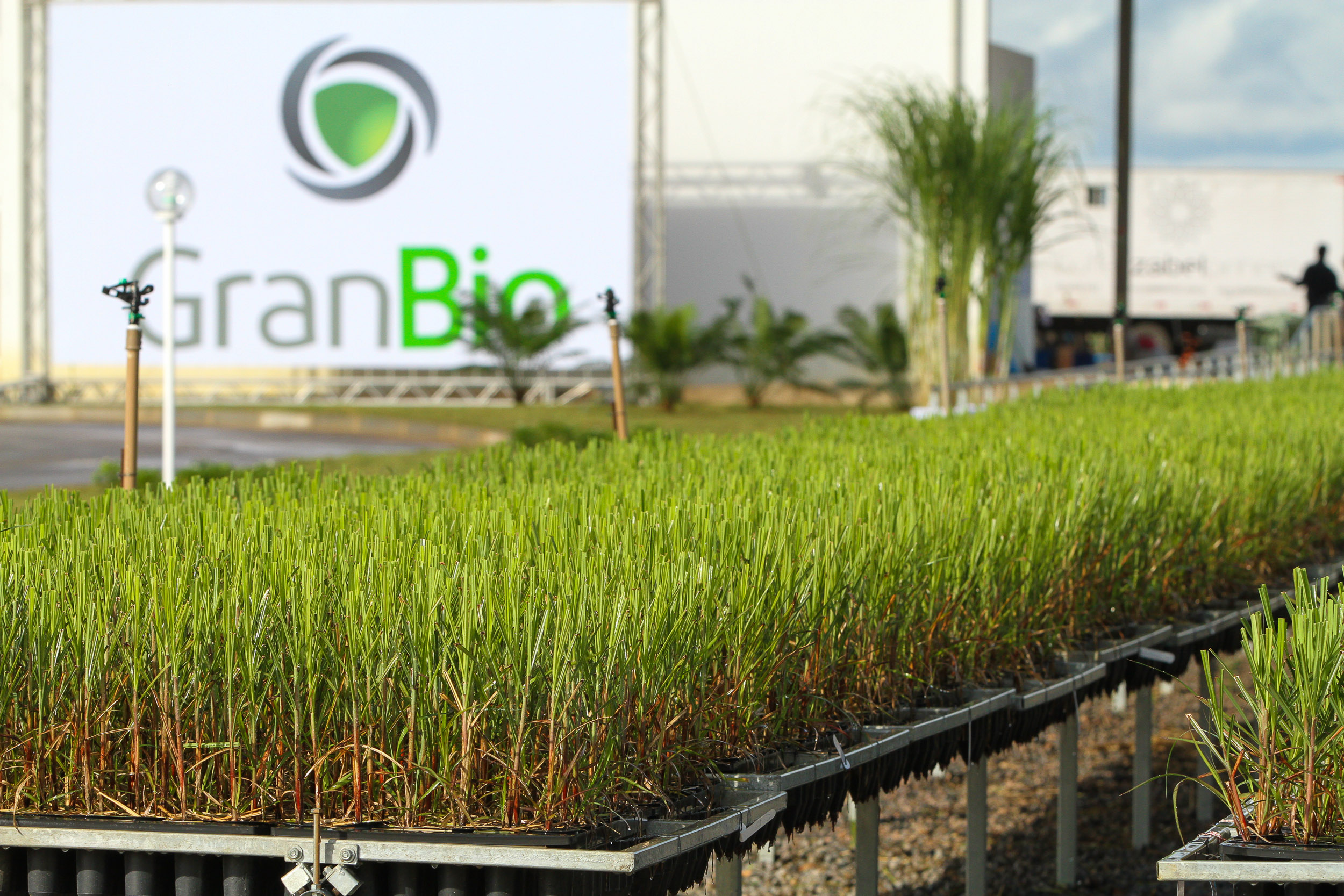
Sugar cane in Alagoas

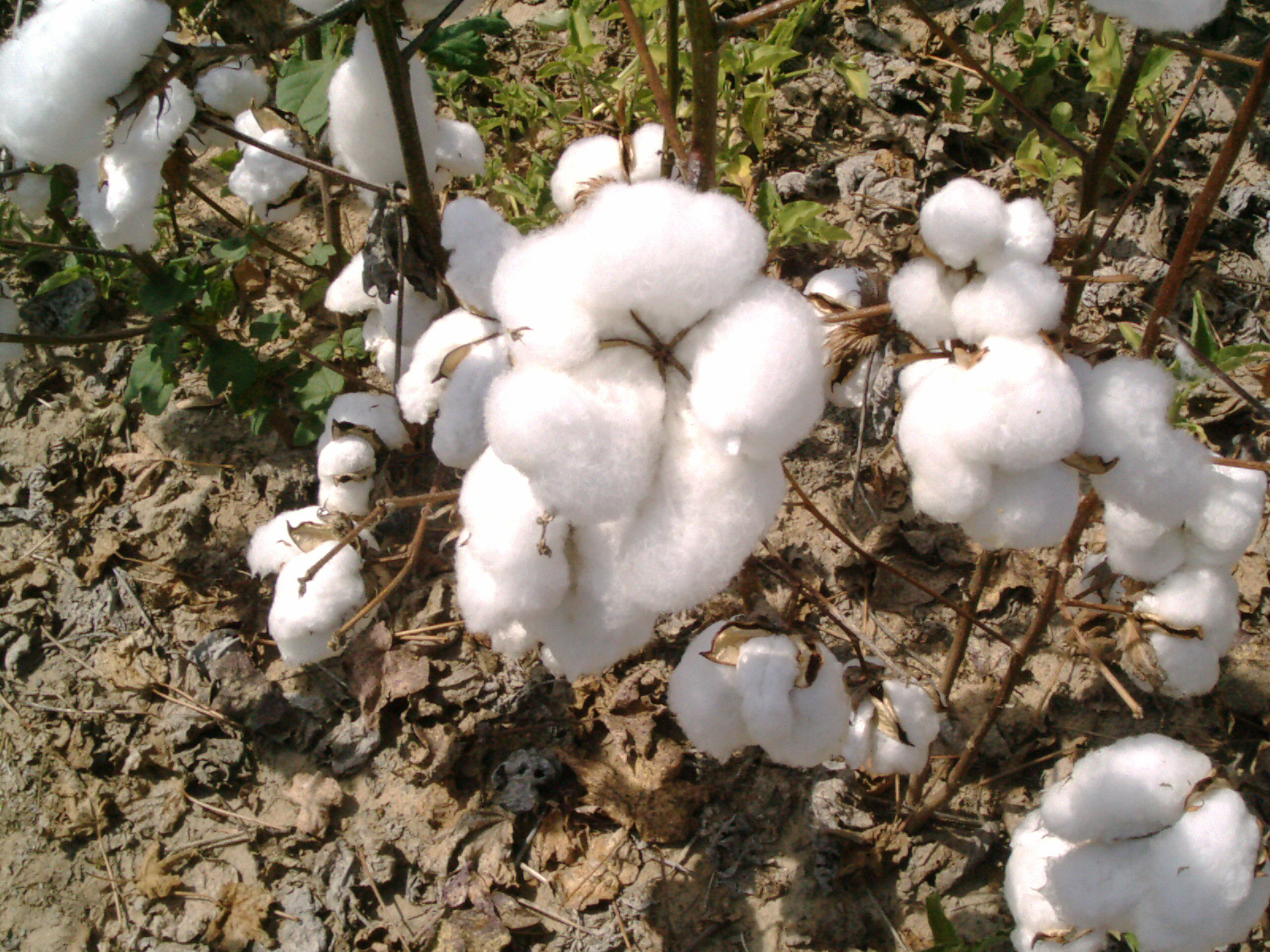
Cotton in Luís Eduardo Magalhães

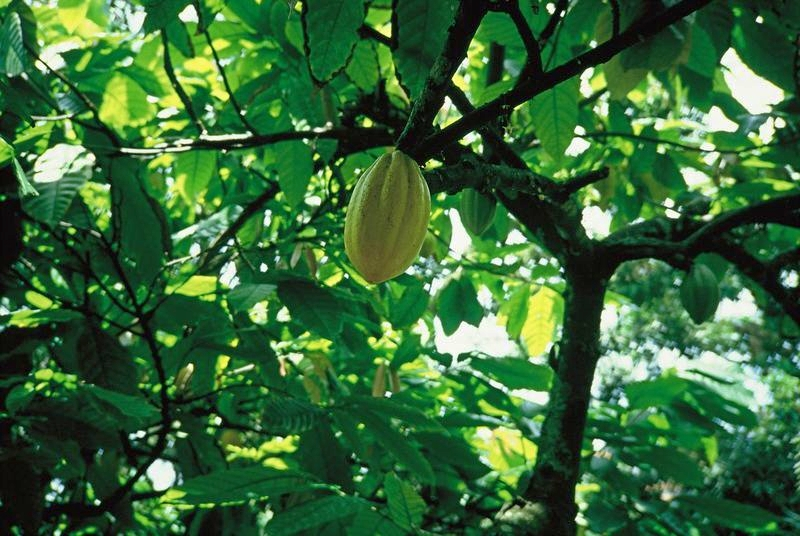
Cocoa in Ilhéus

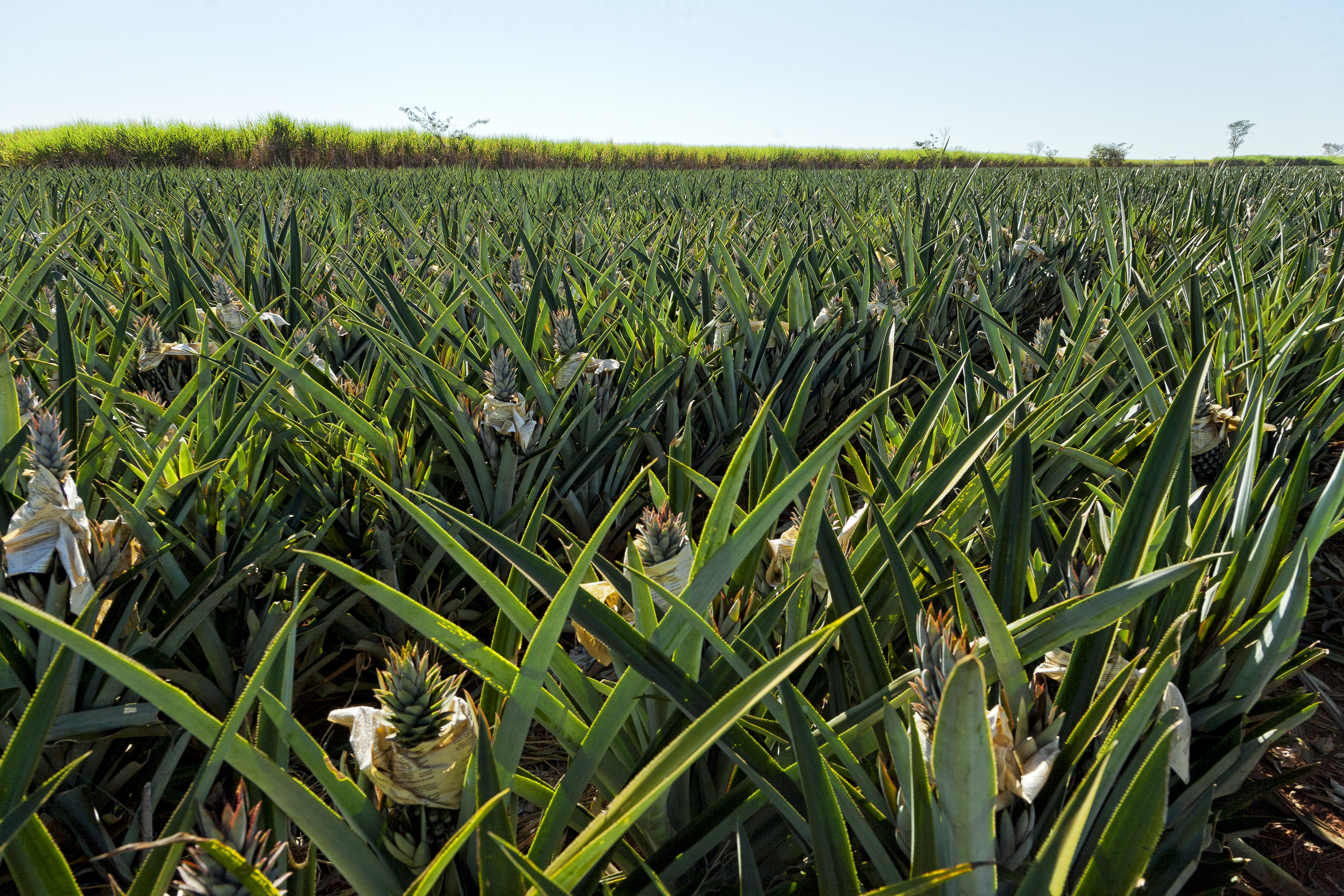
Pineapple in Bahia

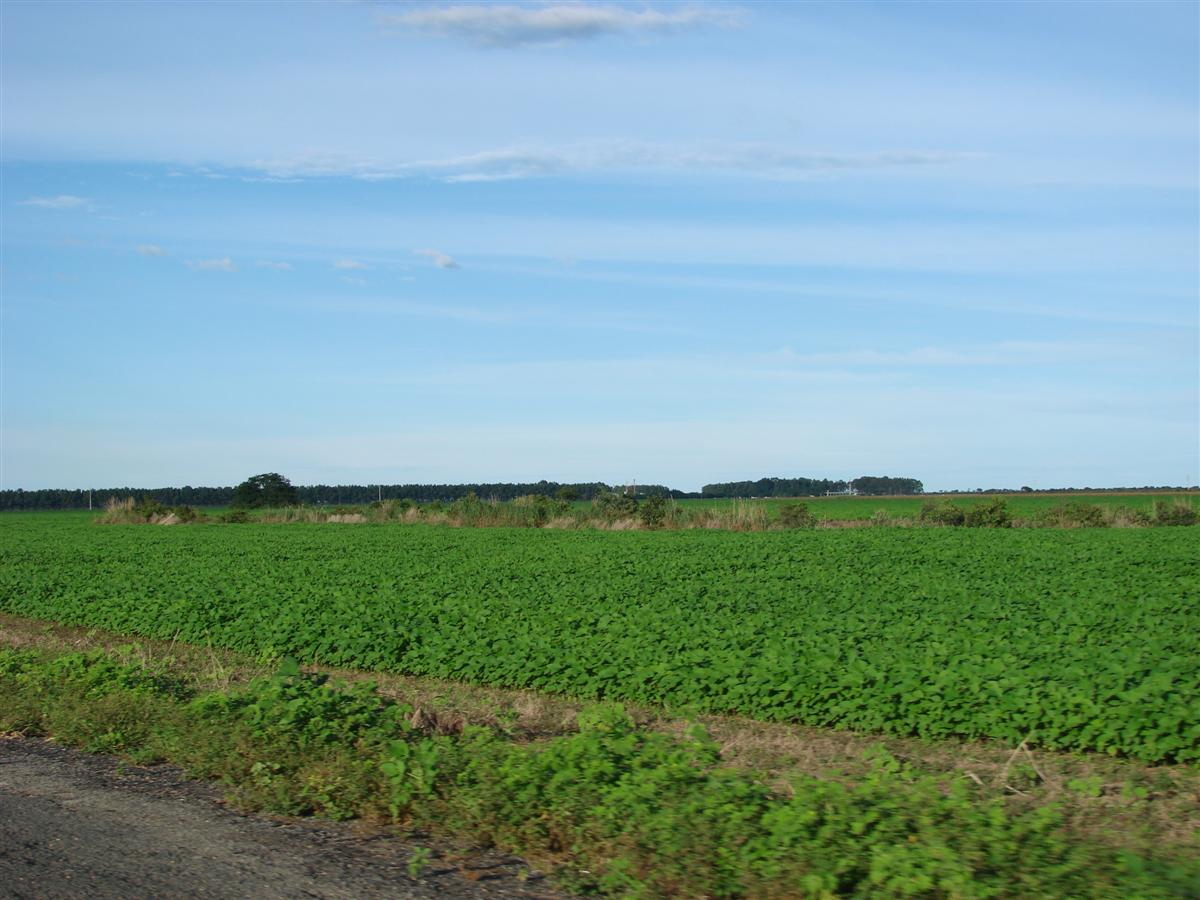
Soybeans in Barreiras

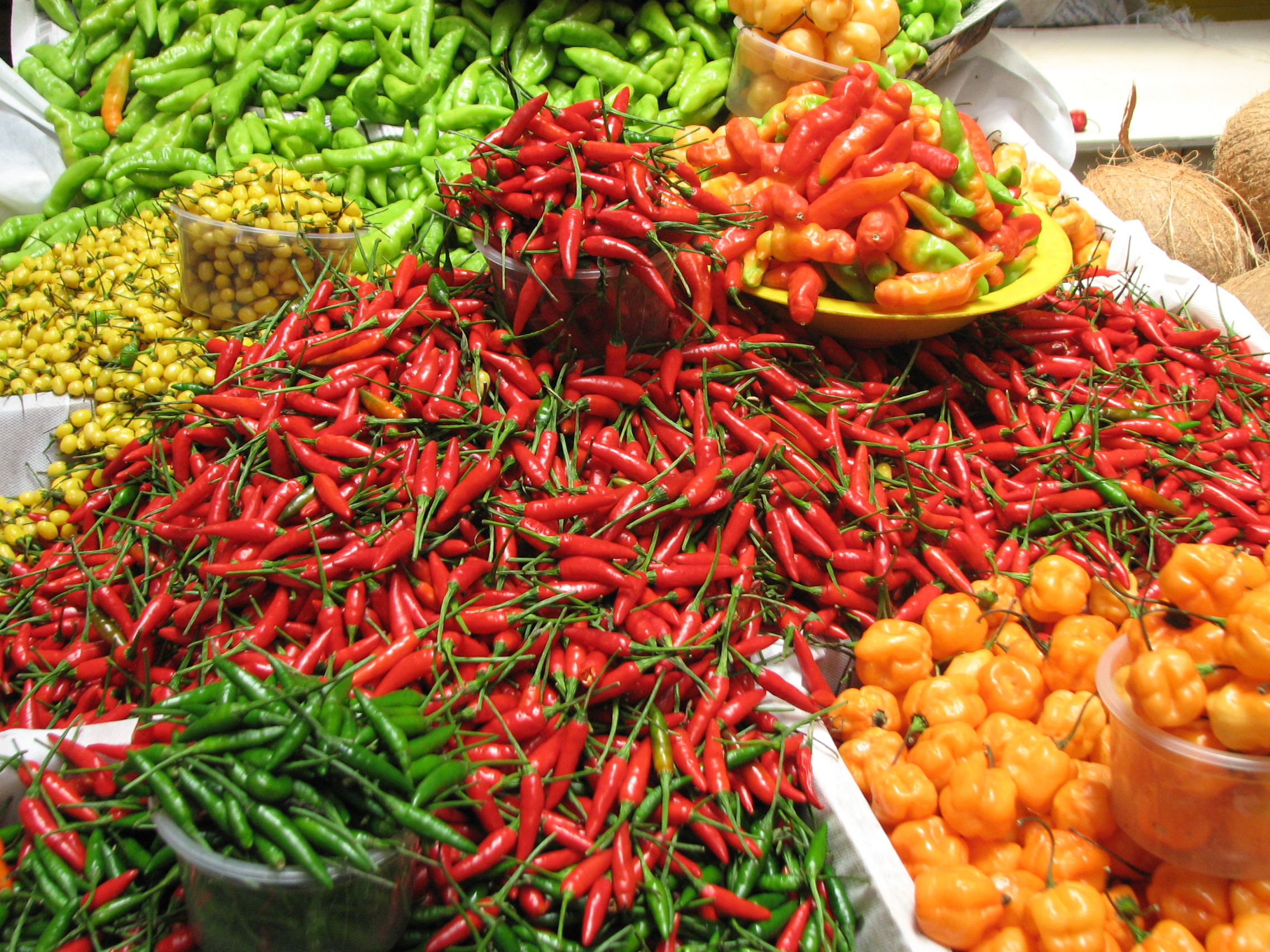
Pepper in Aracaju

The region is a major producer of cashew nuts, sugar cane, cocoa, cotton and tropical fruits in general (mainly coconut, papaya, melon, banana, mango, pineapple and guarana). It also has relevant productions of soy, maize, bean, cassava and oranges. The region is subject to prolonged dry spells that are worse in El Niño years. This causes a periodic rural exodus. Government responses include dams and the transfer of the São Francisco River. The worst recent droughts were in 1993, 1998 and 1999. The latter was the worst in fifty years.

In 2017, the Northeast Region was the largest producer of coconut in the country, with 74.0% of national production. Bahia produced 351 million fruits, Sergipe, 234 million, and Ceará 187 million. However, the sector has been suffering strong competition and losing market to Indonesia, the Philippines and India, the world's largest producers, who even export coconut water to Brazil. In addition to climatic problems, the low productivity of coconut palms in the Northeast Region is the result of factors related to the variety of coconut harvested and the technological level used in coastal regions. In these areas, the semi-extractive cultivation system still prevails, with low fertility and without the adoption of cultural management practices. The three states that have the largest production, Bahia, Sergipe and Ceará, present a yield three times lower than that of Pernambuco, which is in 5th place in the national production. This is because most of the coconut trees in these three states are located in coastal areas and cultivated in semi-extractivist systems.

The production of cashew in Brazil is carried out almost exclusively in the Northeast. The area occupied by cashew trees in Brazil in 2017 was estimated at 505,500 ha; of this total, 99.5% is located in the Northeast. The main producers in this region are Ceará (61.6% of the national area), Rio Grande do Norte and Piauí. However, Brazil, which in 2011 was the fifth largest world producer of cashew nuts, in 2016, fell to 14th position, with 1.5% of the total volume of nuts produced in the world. Vietnam, Nigeria, India and Côte d'Ivoire were the world's largest cashew nut producers in 2016, with 70.6% of global production. In recent years, there has been increased competition with some African countries, where government programs have driven the expansion of culture and processing capacity. It is estimated that at 295 thousand tons per year the installed capacity for processing cashew nuts in the Northeast, however, the Region only managed to produce around a quarter of that quantity. Among the main world producers, Brazil has the lowest productivity. Several factors are pointed out as the cause of the low productivity and the fall in the Brazilian production of cashew nuts. One reason is that most orchards are in a phase of natural decline in production. In addition, the giant cashew trees, which are the majority in the Region, are exploited in an almost extractive manner, with low use of technology.

In the production of cocoa, for a long time, Bahia led the Brazilian production. Today, it is disputing the leadership of national production with the state of Pará. In 2017 Pará obtained the leadership for the first time. In 2019, people from Pará harvested 135 thousand tons of cocoa, and Bahians harvested 130 thousand tons. Bahia's cocoa area is practically three times larger than that of Pará, but Pará's productivity is practically three times greater. Some factors that explain this are: the crops in Bahia are more extractivist, and those in Pará have a more modern and commercial style, in addition to paraenses using more productive and resistant seeds, and their region providing resistance to Witch's broom.

In 2018, the Northeast was in 3rd place among the regions that most produce sugar cane in the country. Brazil is the world's largest producer, with 672.8 million tons harvested this year. The Northeast harvested 45.7 million tons, 6.8% of national production. Alagoas is the largest producer, with 33.3% of Northeastern production (15.2 million tons). Pernambuco is the 2nd largest producer in the Northeast, with 22.7% of the total in the region (10.3 million tons). Paraíba has 11.9% of northeastern production (5.5 million tons) and Bahia, 10.24% of production (4.7 million tons).

Bahia is the 2nd largest producer of cotton in Brazil, losing only to Mato Grosso. In 2019, it harvested 1.5 million tonnes of the product.

In soy, Brazil produced close to 120 million tons in 2019, being the largest world producer. In 2019, the Northeast produced close to 10.7 million tons, or 9% of the Brazilian total. The largest producers in the Northeast were Bahia (5.3 million tons), Maranhão (3 million tons) and Piauí (2.4 million tons). In the production of maize, in 2018 Brazil was the 3rd largest producer in the world, with 82 million tons. The Northeast produced about 8.4% of the country's total. Bahia was the largest producer in the Northeast, with 2.2 million tons. Piauí was the 2nd largest producer in the Northeast, with 1.5 million tons, and Maranhão was the 3rd largest, with 1.3 million tons.

In 2018, the South Region was the main producer of beans with 26.4% of the total, followed by the Midwest (25.4%), Southeast Region (25.1%), Northeast (20.6%) and North (2.5%). The largest producers in the Northeast were Ceará, Bahia, Piauí and Pernambuco. In cassava production, Brazil produced a total of 17.6 million tons in 2018. Maranhão was the 7th largest producer in the country, with 681 thousand tons. Ceará was 9th, with 622 thousand tons. Bahia was 10th with 610 thousand tons. In total, the northeast produced 3,5 million tons.

Regarding oranges, Bahia was the 4th largest producer in Brazil in 2018, with a total of 604 thousand tons. Sergipe was 6th, with 354 thousand tons. Alagoas was 7th with 166 thousand tons.

Bahia is the second largest fruit producer in the country, with more than 3.3 million tons a year, behind São Paulo. The north of Bahia is one of the main fruit suppliers in the country. The State is one of the main national producers of ten types of fruit. In 2017, Bahia led the production of cajarana, coconut, count fruit or pinecone, soursop, umbu, jackfruit, licuri, mango and passion fruit, and is in second place in cocoa almond, atemoia, cupuaçu, lime and lemon, and third in banana, carambola, guava, papaya, watermelon, melon, cherry, pomegranate and table grapes. In all, 34 products from Bahia's fruit culture have an important participation in the national economy. Rio Grande do Norte is the largest producer of melon in the country. In 2017 it produced 354 thousand tons, distributed between the cities of Mossoró, Tibau and Apodi. The Northeast region accounted for 95.8% of the country's production in 2007. In addition to Rio Grande do Norte, which in 2005 produced 45.4% of the country's total, the other 3 largest in the country were Ceará, Bahia and Pernambuco.

In the production of papaya, in 2018 Bahia was the 2nd largest producer state in Brazil, almost equaling with Espírito Santo. Ceará was in 3rd place and Rio Grande do Norte in 4th place. Bahia was the largest producer of mango in the country in 2019, with production of around 281 thousand tons per year. Juazeiro (130 thousand tons per year) and Casa Nova (54 thousand tons per year) are at the top of the list of Brazilian cities that lead the cultivation of fruit. In the production of banana, in 2018 Bahia was the 2nd largest national producer. Pernambuco came in 5th place. Regarding pineapple, in 2018 Paraíba was the 2nd largest producer state in Brazil.

Bahia is the largest Brazilian producer of guaraná. In 2017, Brazilian production was close to 3.3 million tons. Bahia harvested 2.3 million (mainly in the city of Taperoá), Amazonas 0.7 million (mainly in the city of Maués) and the rest of the country, 0.3 million. Despite the fact that the fruit originated in the Amazon, since 1989 Bahia has beaten Amazonas in terms of production volume and guarana productivity, due to the fact that the soil in Bahia is more favorable, in addition to the absence of diseases in the region. The most famous users of the product, however, acquire 90% to 100% of their guarana from the Amazon region, such as AMBEV and Coca-Cola. Bahian guarana prices are well below those of other states, but Sudam's tax exemptions lead the beverage industry to prefer to purchase seeds in the North, which helps maintain the highest added value of Amazonian guarana. The pharmaceutical industries and importers, on the other hand, buy more guarana from Bahia, due to the price.

=== Animal husbandry ===
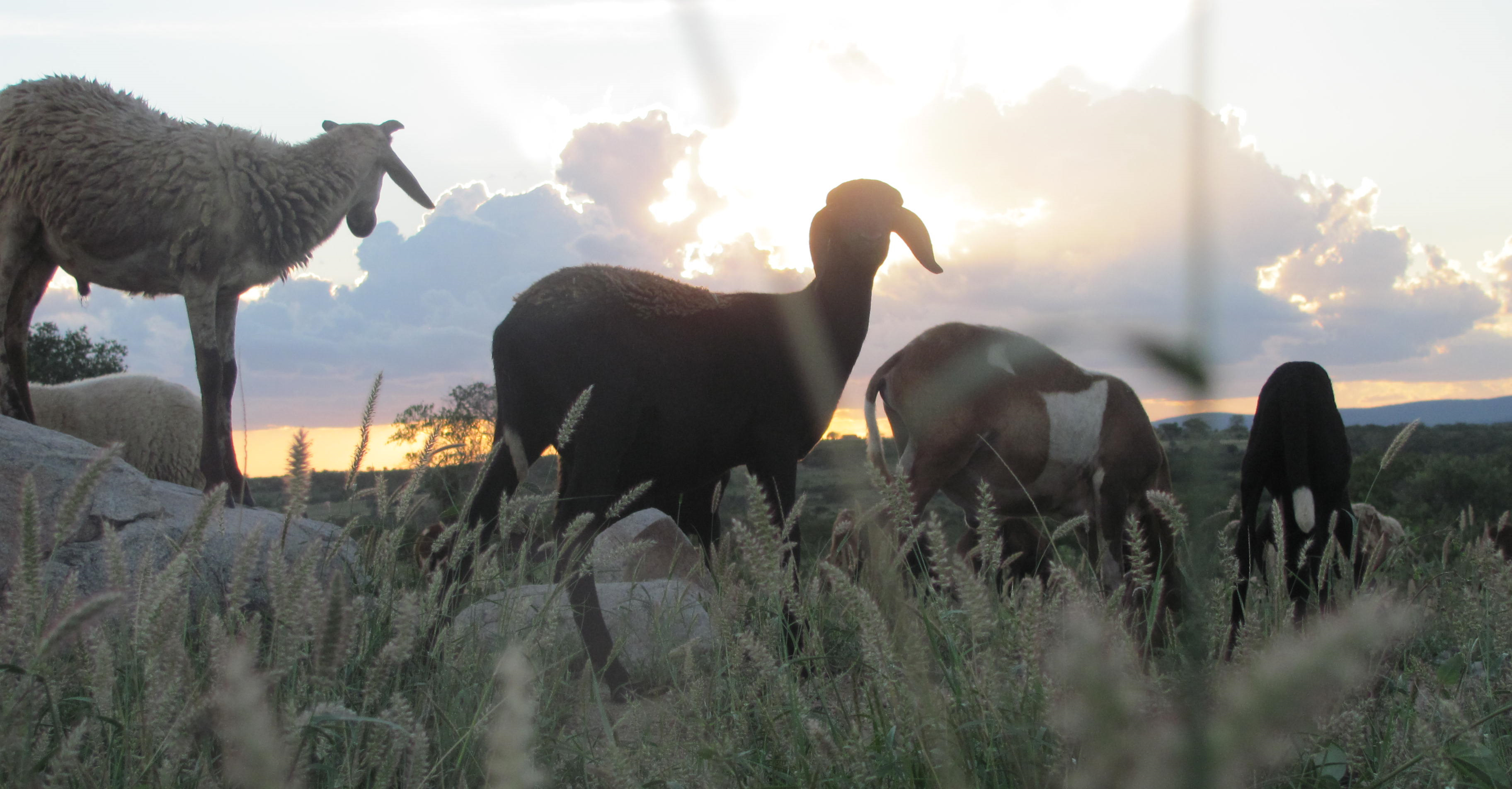
Goats in Araci

In 2017, the Northeast had 12.9% of the Brazilian cattle herd. In the sertão, producers often suffer losses due to constant droughts. There are also goat breeds, which are more resistant, pigs, sheep and birds. Livestock fairs are common in the cities of the northeastern countryside. These fairs gave rise to cities like Campina Grande, Feira de Santana and Caruaru.

The Northeast region housed 93.2% of the goat herd (8,944,461 heads) and 64.2% of the sheep herd (11,544,939 heads) in Brazil in 2017. Bahia concentrated 30.9% of the goat herd and 20.9% of the national sheep herd. Casa Nova (BA) took first place in the municipal ranking with the largest numbers of both species.

Regarding pork, Brazil had almost 42 million hogs in 2017. The Northeast had 13% of the total (5.4 million). In poultry farming, Brazil had a total of 1.4 billion chickens in 2017. The Northeast had 11.6% of the total (164 million). In milk production, Brazil produced 33.5 billion liters in 2017. The Northeast produced 11.6% of the total (3.9 billion liters). In the production of eggs, Brazil produced 4.2 billion dozens in 2017. The Northeast produced 16.1% (683 million dozens).

The Northeast was the 2nd largest honey producer in the country in 2017, losing to the South region. The total produced in the country was 41.6 thousand tons. The Northeast produced 30.7% (12.7 thousand tons). In 2017, the Northeast was the largest shrimp producer in the country. National production was 41 thousand tons. Rio Grande do Norte (37.7%) and Ceará (28.9%) were the largest producers. Aracati-CE was the municipality with the highest participation .

=== Mining ===
In Northeast Region, Bahia stands out, with 1.68% of the national mineral participation (4th place in the country). In 2017, at gold, it produced 6.2 tons, at a value of R$730 million. At copper, it produced 56 thousand tons, at a value of R$404 million. At chrome, it produced 520 thousand tons, at a value of R$254 million. In vanadium, it produced 358 thousand tons, at a value of R$91 million.

In the extraction of precious and semi-precious stones, Bahia has small or medium scale productions of amethyst, agate, diamond, emerald, garnet, opal, ruby, tourmaline and turquoise. There is also aquamarine production in Rio Grande do Norte, Ceará, Alagoas and Paraíba; grenades in Paraíba, Ceará and Rio Grande do Norte; opal in Piauí and Ceará; tourmaline in Ceará and Tourmaline Paraíba in Paraíba and Rio Grande do Norte.

=== Industry ===
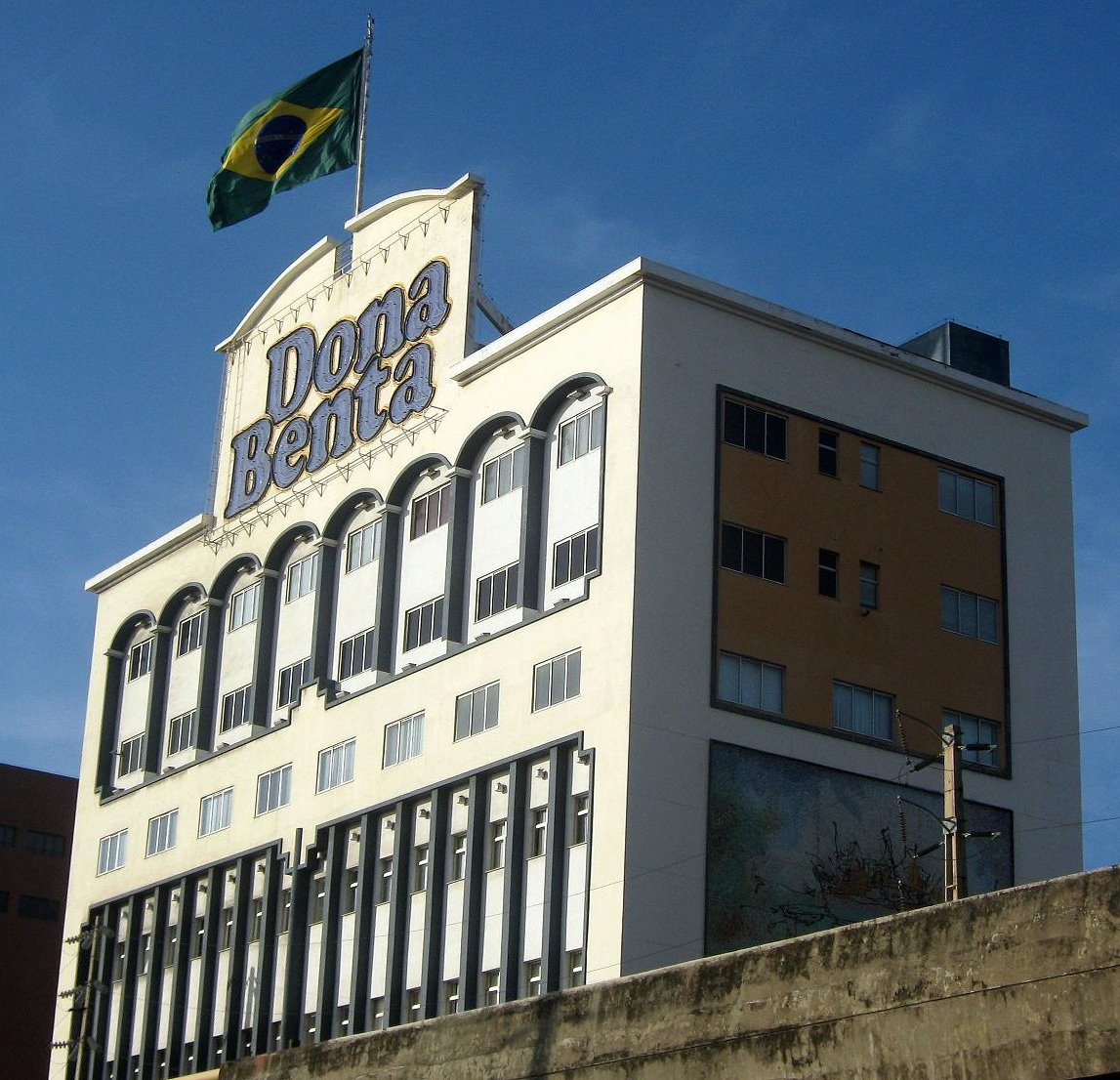
J Macêdo is one of the largest pasta industries in Brazil.

In 2017, the Northeast Region had close to 13% of the country's industrial GDP. Bahia has 4.4% of the national industrial GDP, Pernambuco 2.7%, Ceará 1.9%, Maranhão 1.1%, Rio Grande do Norte 0.9%, Paraíba 0.7%, Sergipe 0.6%, Alagoas 0.5% and Piauí 0.4%,. It is the least industrialized region of the country, in proportion per inhabitant. The states that have some relevant industrial level are Bahia, Pernambuco and Ceará.

Bahian industry have automobile and tyre industries, footwear and textiles, furniture, food and beverages, cosmetics and perfumes, information technology and naval sectors. In Brazil, the automotive sector represents close to 22% of industrial GDP. Bahia had a Ford factory. It was created in Camaçari (2001). The Bahian automotive sector, led by Ford was in 2005 the third largest contributor (14.6%) to the Bahian GDP. Currently the state is trying to replace Ford, which stopped producing in Brazil. The state also has a petrochemical complex in Camaçari.

In Pernambuco, the naval, automobile, chemical, metallurgical, flat glass, electro-electronic, non-metallic minerals, textile and food industries stand out. Currently, the Suape Industrial and Port Complex, located in the area of the homonymous port, Metropolitan Region of Recife, is the main industrial pole of Pernambuco. The state capital is home to Porto Digital, a technology park with more than 200 companies, including multinationals such as Accenture, Oracle, ThoughtWorks, Ogilvy, IBM and Microsoft, accounting for 3.9% of Pernambuco's GDP.

The main sectors of the Ceará industry are clothing, food, metallurgy, textiles, chemicals and footwear. Most of the industries are installed in the Metropolitan Region of Fortaleza, where the Industrial District of Maracanaú is located. In São Gonçalo do Amarante, a steel mill is installed, Companhia Siderúrgica do Pecém, which in 2018 produced 2.9 million tons of crude steel, of the 35.4 million produced in the country. Some of the large companies in Ceará with national reach are: Aço Cearense (steel), Companhia de Alimentos do Nordeste (food), Grendene (footwear), Café Santa Clara (coffee), Grande Moinho Cearense (mill), Edson Queiroz Group (business conglomerate, works with gas, mineral water, household appliances, communications, education, among others), Naval Industry of Ceará, J. Macêdo, M. Dias Branco (food company that manufactures, markets and distributes cookies, pasta, cakes, snacks, wheat flour, margarine and vegetable fats), Troller and Ypióca. The state is generally poor. According to 2013 data, 396,370 people live in slums in Fortaleza. Fortaleza has the 2nd largest population in a slum among cities in the Northeast. 31.6% of residents have income per capita up to half the minimum wage. The state's productivity is small.

In other states, the industry generally boils down to food processing.

=== Tourism and recreation ===
See Also: List of beaches#Brazil, List of national parks of Brazil, Brazil#Tourism

As elsewhere in Brazil, tourism has grown significantly in the past few decades.

Most coastal cities of Nordeste, besides the capital cities, have natural amenities, such as the Abrolhos Marine National Park, Itacaré, Comandatuba Island, Costa do Sauípe, Canavieiras and Porto Seguro, in the state of Bahia; the Marine National Park of Fernando de Noronha, Porto de Galinhas beach in the state of Pernambuco; tropical paradises, such as Canoa Quebrada and Jericoacoara, on the coast of Ceará, as well as places to practice paragliding, as in Quixadá and Sobral; and Lençóis Maranhenses, embellishing the coast of Maranhão State, among many others.

In the interior, there are the national parks of Serra da Capivara and Sete Cidades, both in the state of Piauí; the city of João Pessoa in the state of Paraíba; Chapada Diamantina, in the state of Bahia; and many other attractions. The tourist industry is based largely around the beaches of Nordeste, attracting thousands of tourists per year from other regions of Brazil as well as from Europe (especially Italy, Portugal, Germany, France, the United Kingdom and Spain), the United States, and Australia. There are two recognized nudist beaches in Nordeste: Tambaba Beach north of Recife, Paraíba, and Massarandupio Beach 100 km north of Salvador, Bahia.

== Infrastructure ==
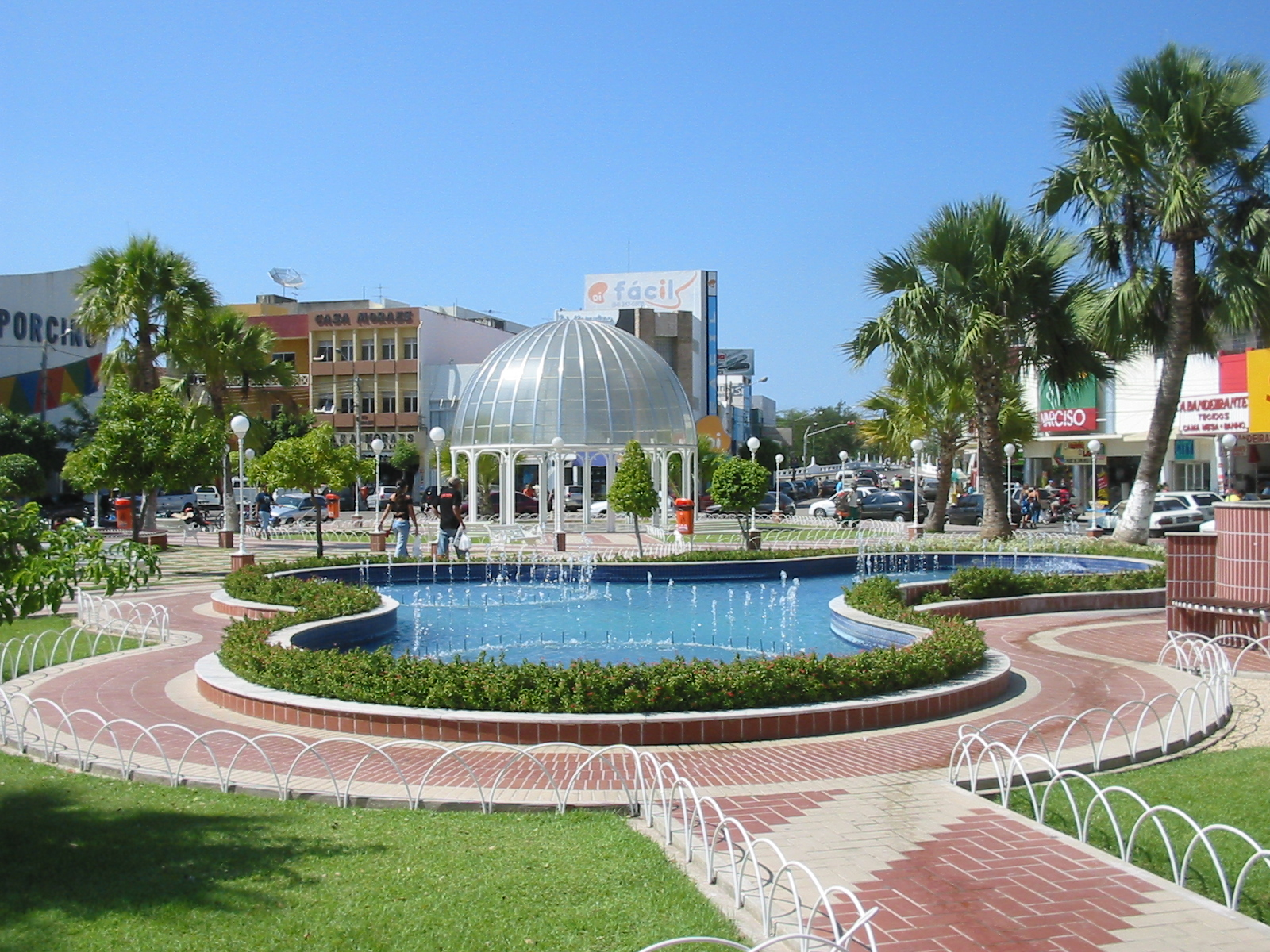
Mossoró city in Rio Grande do Norte is one of the largest onshore petroleum producers in Brazil.

=== Educational institutions ===
- Universidade Federal de Pernambuco (UFPE)
- Universidade Federal da Bahia (UFBA)
- Universidade da Integração Internacional da Lusofonia Afro-Brasileira (UNILAB)
- Universidade Federal do Ceará (UFC)
- Universidade Federal da Paraíba (UFPB)
- Universidade Federal do Rio Grande do Norte (UFRN)
- Universidade Federal de Sergipe (UFS)
- Universidade Federal de Alagoas (UFAL)
- Universidade Federal do Maranhão (UFMA)
- Universidade Federal do Piauí (UFPI)
- and many others.

=== International airports ===
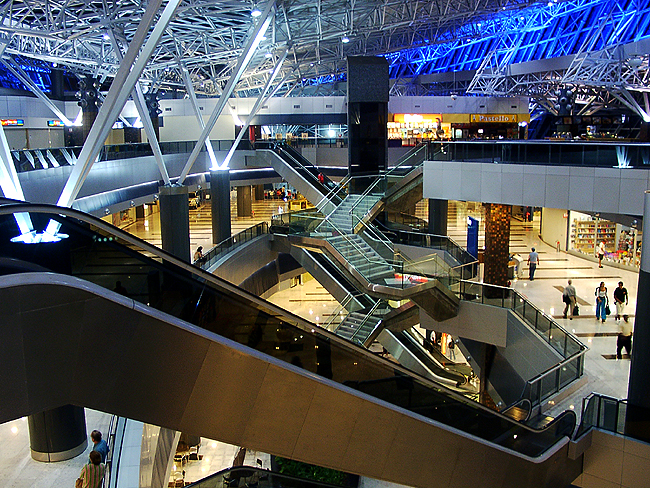
Guararapes International Airport in Recife

- AJU Santa Maria Airport (Sergipe), Aracaju, Sergipe
- MCZ Zumbi dos Palmares International Airport, Maceió, Alagoas
- PHB Parnaíba-Prefeito Dr. João Silva Filho International Airport Parnaíba, Piauí
- SLZ Marechal Cunha Machado International Airport, Sao Luis, Maranhão
- NAT Greater Natal International Airport, Natal, Rio Grande do Norte
- FOR Pinto Martins International Airport, Fortaleza, Ceará
- JPA Presidente Castro Pinto International Airport, João Pessoa, Paraíba
- REC Guararapes International Airport, Recife, Pernambuco
- SSA Deputado Luís Eduardo Magalhães International Airport, Salvador, Bahia

=== Oil refineries ===
- Lubnor (Petrobras), Fortaleza 82,000 bbl/d (13,000 m3/d)

=== Seaports ===
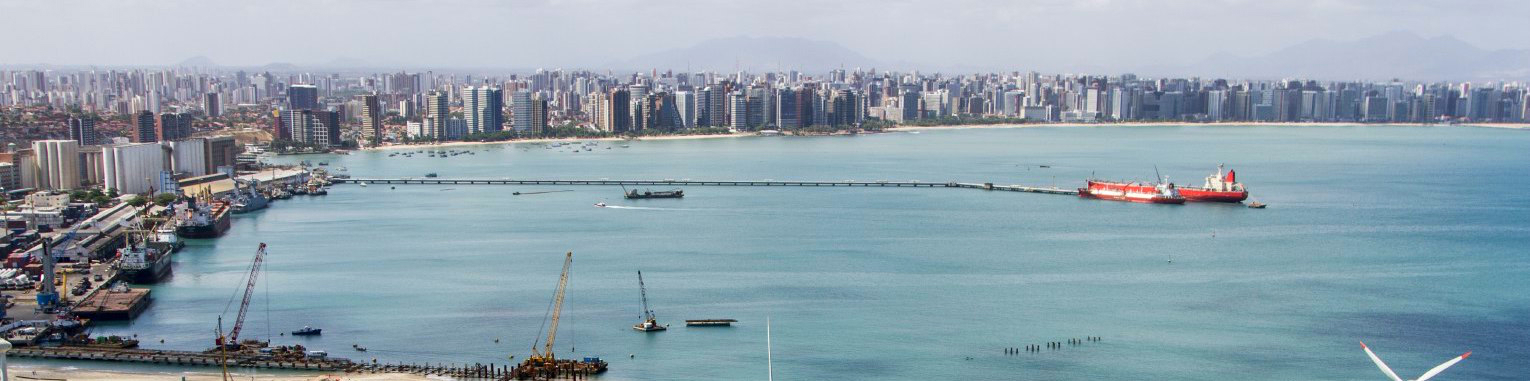
Mucuripe Port in Fortaleza

- Mucuripe port, Ceará
- Suape port, Ipojuca, Pernambuco
- Aratu Port, Bahia
- Port of Itaqui,Maranhão

=== Petrochemical plant ===
- Braskem, Camaçari, Bahia

=== Railroads ===
Planned for completion in 2013, a new railway will link Suape to the north-eastern interior. The federal government began construction in 1990, but it was postponed due to a shortage of money and only resumed in 2006. A second branch will travel north to the port of Pecém, which is also being expanded. There, the Ceará state government is setting up an institute to provide railroad travel for 12,000 workers a year, while Petrobras is also building another refinery. Paulo Roberto Costa, its downstream director, envisages trains transporting soybeans, corn, and iron ore from the interior to the ports, and returning with oil. Journey times to Europe and America will be three or four days less than from south-eastern ports. The 1,728-km line will one day carry 30 million tonnes of cargo a year.

The north–south railway and the Carajás railray in Maranhão are important logistics corridors, transporting the iron ore from the Serra dos Carajás in Pará and draining the agricultural production (soybeans, corn, cotton) of southern Maranhão, Tocantins, Goiás and Mato Groso, to the ports of Itaqui and Ponta da Madeira, in São Luís. Other products are also transported, such as cellulose and fuels.

=== Hydroelectric dams and reservoirs ===
Brazil counts on hydroelectricity for more than 80% of its electricity.

Alagoas / Sergipe

- Xingó Hydroelectric Power Plant 3162

Bahia

- Apollonius Sales (Moxoto) Hydroelectric Power Plant 400
- Paulo Afonso Complex Hydroelectric Power Plant 1417.2
- Paulo Afonso IV Hydroelectric Power Plant 2642.4
- Sobradinho Hydroelectric Power Plant 1050

Maranhão

- Boa Esperanca (Castelo Branco) Hydroelectric Power Plant 237.4
- Estreito Hydroelectric Plant- 1.087

Pernambuco

- Luiz Gonzaga (Itaparica) Hydroelectric Power Plant 1479.6

In 2018, in Maranhão, natural gas exploration in the Parnaíba Basin has the capacity to produce 8.4 million m^{3} of gas per day, exploited by Eneva, with the implementation of 153 km of gas pipelines, at the cost of R $9 billion. Such production is destined for the production of electric energy in the Parnaíba Power Station, with 1.4 GW of capacity. The thermal power stations has important composition in the generation of energy in the region, with other examples being the Campina Grande Power Starion, the Pecém Power Station and the Jorge Lacerda Power Station, among others. In 2017, due to low levels of reservoirs, wind energy accounted for 50% of the electric power generation in the region, with the states of Rio Grande do Norte, with 3,722 MW and 137 parks; Bahia, with 2,594 MW and 100 parks; Ceará, with 1,950 MW and 75 parks; Piauí, with 1,443 MW and 52 parks; Pernambuco, with 781 MW and 34 parks; Maranhão, with 220 MW and 8 parks; and Paraíba, with 157 MW and 15 parks.

New investments, seeking to diversify the northeastern energy matrix and promote energy security, allowed in 2017 the start-up of the Solar Lapa Park (BA), with 158 MW, Solar Ituverava Park (BA), with 254 MW, and the Solar Park Nova Olinda (PI), with 292 MW, considered the largest solar parks in Latin America. In 2018, the Solar Parque Horizonte (BA) was inaugurated, with 103 MW.

== Demographics ==
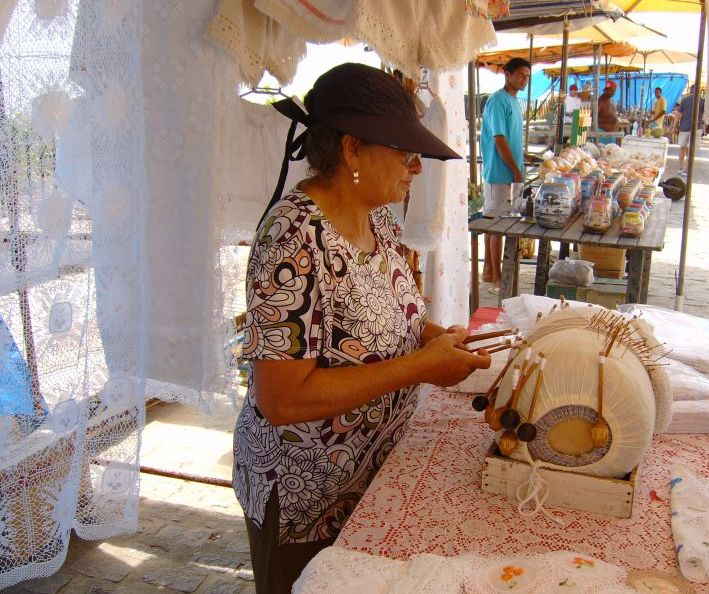
Rendeira woman from Ceará

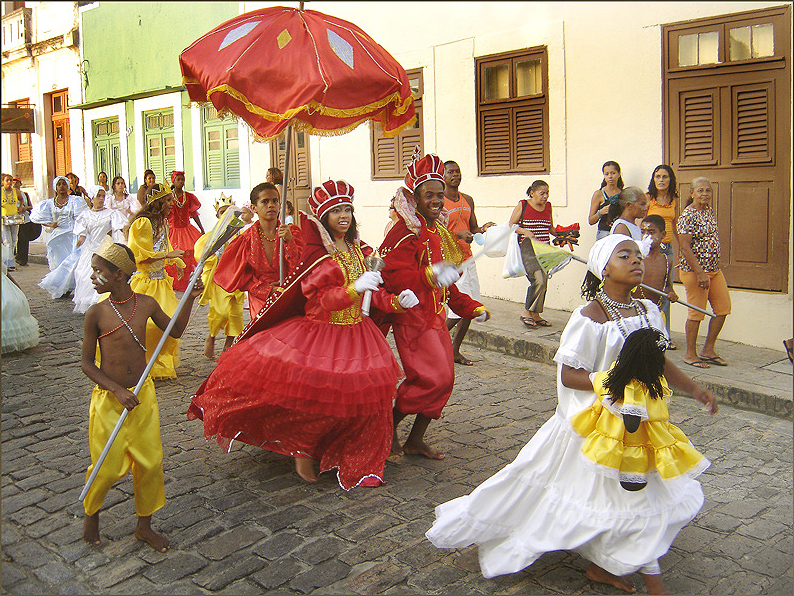
The Maracatu, a cultural aspect resulted from the mix between Amerindians, Portuguese and Africans in Northeast Brazil.

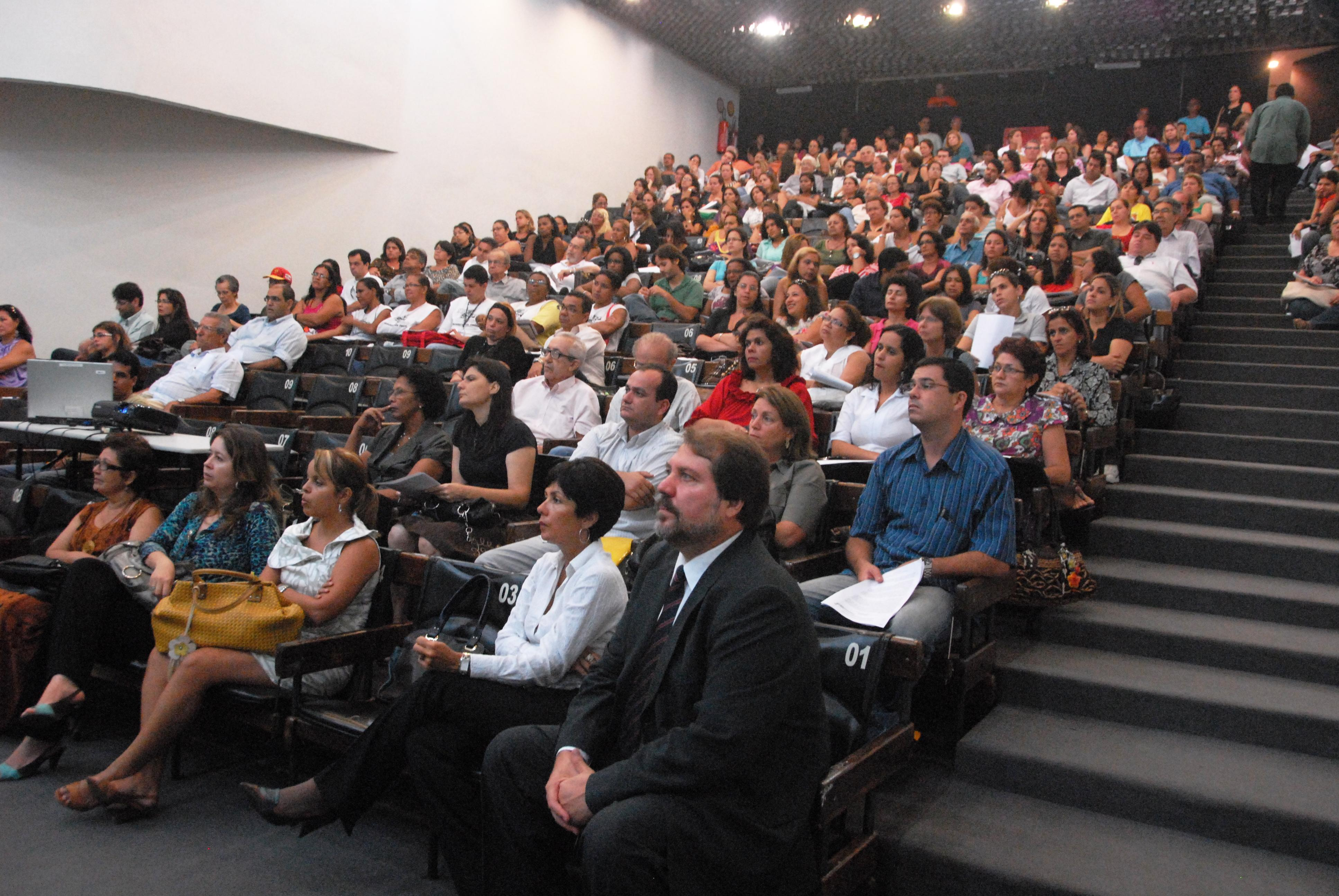
Local health care training by the Olinda local administration

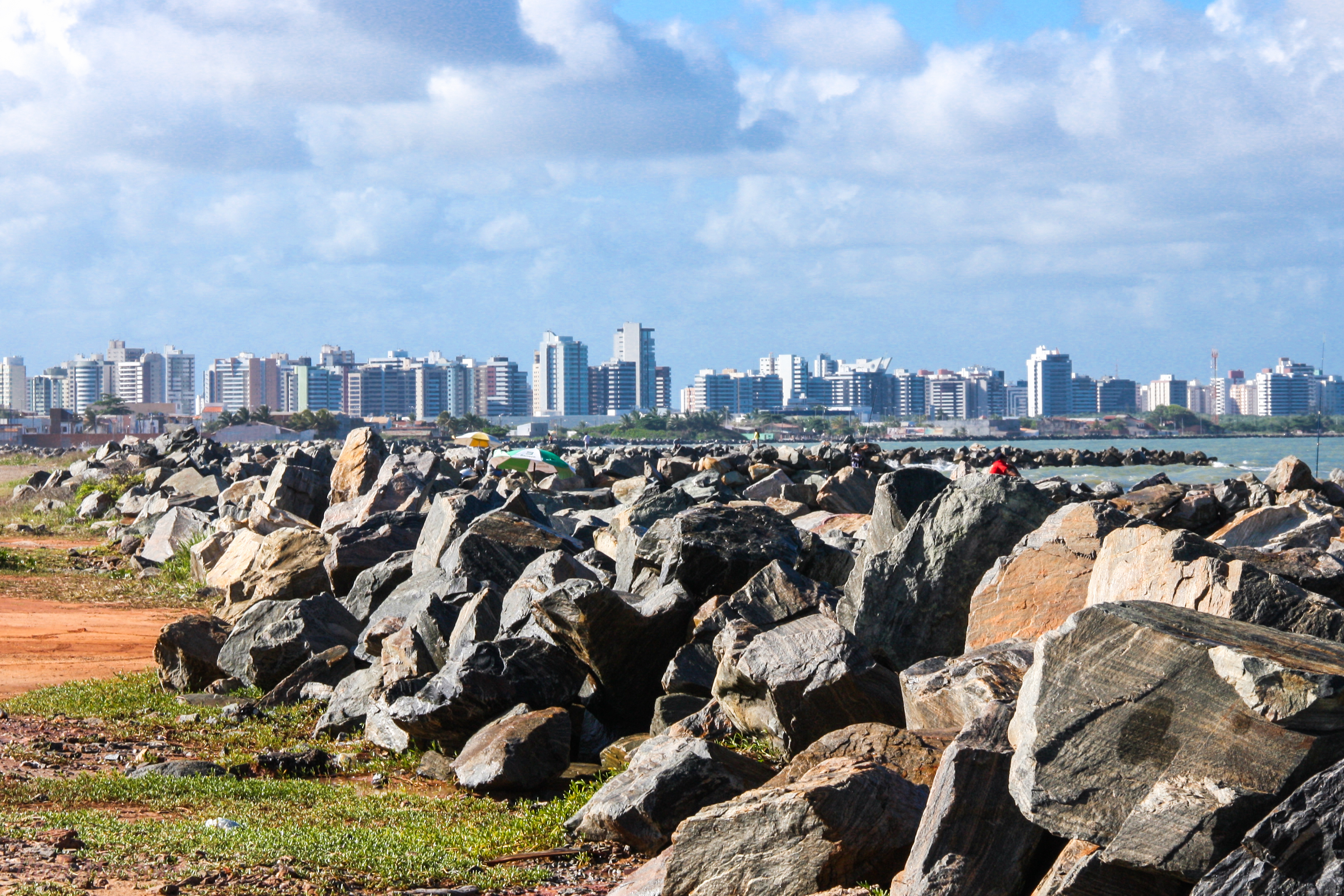
Aracaju is the city with the best quality of life in Northeastern Brazil.

=== Urban areas and rural areas ===
Nordeste's major cities are almost all on the Atlantic coast. Some exceptions can be seen, however, like Petrolina-Juazeiro conurbation Bahia/Pernambuco (population over 500,000) on the São Francisco River and Teresina-Timon conurbation Piauí (population nearly 1,000,000) on the Parnaíba River.

Good rural areas are scarce and generally they are all near the coast, or in the west of Maranhão, and are mainly used for exportation products. In the semi-arid areas of the Northeast Region, rural areas do exist, but rain is scarce in the region; rural areas in the interior are generally based on subsistence agriculture. Fazendas (large farms) are common in the interior, where cattle-raising and the cultivation of tropical fruit is often practiced. Also, in the areas where water is scarce local politicians often use the promise of irrigation projects as a bargaining chip to win elections.

=== Ethnic groups ===
Northeastern Brazilians are a result of the mixing of Europeans, Africans and Native Americans. African ancestry is significant particularly in the coastal areas, and especially in Bahia, Pernambuco and Maranhão. Native American ancestry is also present in all states, though more significantly in Ceará and Maranhão. Northeastern Brazilians also have a significant degree of European ancestry.

The racial makeup of the region is considered to be one of the primary reasons for which Northeastern Brazilians are often the target of prejudice and discrimination within Brazil, with other reasons including the region's comparative poverty and its leftist political leanings.

Skin color/Race (2022)
Multiracial	59.6%
White	26.7%
Black	13.0%
Amerindian	0.6%
Asian	0.1%

=== Ethnic composition of Northeast Brazil compared to other regions ===
The composition of the Northeast of Brazil compared to other regions of Brazil according to autosomal genetic studies focused on the Brazilian population (which has been found to be a complex melting pot of European, African and Native Americans components):

A 2015 autosomal genetic study, which also analysed data of 25 studies of 38 different Brazilian populations concluded that: European ancestry accounts for 62% of the heritage of the population, followed by the African (21%) and the Native American (17%). The European contribution is highest in Southern Brazil (77%), the African highest in Northeast Brazil (27%) and the Native American is the highest in Northern Brazil (32%).

Region	European	African	Native American
North Region	51%	16%	32%
Northeast Region	58%	27%	15%
Central-West Region	64%	24%	12%
Southeast Region	67%	23%	10%
South Region	77%	12%	11%

An autosomal study from 2013, with nearly 1300 samples from all of the Brazilian regions, found a pred. degree of European ancestry combined with African and Native American contributions, in varying degrees. 'Following an increasing North to South gradient, European ancestry was the most prevalent in all urban populations (with values up to 74%). The populations in the North consisted of a significant proportion of Native American ancestry that was about two times higher than the African contribution. Conversely, in Nordeste, Center-West and Southeast, African ancestry was the second most prevalent. At an intrapopulation level, all urban populations were highly admixed, and most of the variation in ancestry proportions was observed between individuals within each population rather than among population'.

Region	European	African	Native American
North Region	51%	17%	32%
Northeast Region	56%	28%	16%
Central-West Region	58%	26%	16%
Southeast Region	61%	27%	12%
South Region	74%	15%	11%

A 2011 autosomal DNA study, with nearly 1000 samples from all over the country ("whites", "pardos" and "blacks"), found a major European contribution, followed by a high African contribution and an important Native American component. The study showed that Brazilians from different regions are more homogeneous than previously thought by some based on the census alone. "Brazilian homogeneity is, therefore, a lot greater between Brazilian regions than within Brazilian regions."

Region	European	African	Native American
Northern Brazil	68.80%	10.50%	18.50%
Northeast of Brazil	60.10%	29.30%	8.90%
Southeast Brazil	74.20%	17.30%	7.30%
Southern Brazil	79.50%	10.30%	9.40%

According to an autosomal DNA study from 2010, a new portrayal of each ethnicity contribution to the DNA of Brazilians, obtained with samples from the five regions of the country, has indicated that, on average, European ancestors are responsible for nearly 80% of the genetic heritage of the population. The variation between the regions is small, with the possible exception of the South, where the European contribution reaches nearly 90%. The results, published by the scientific American Journal of Human Biology by a team of the Catholic University of Brasília, show that, in Brazil, physical indicators such as colour of skin, eyes and hair have little to do with the genetic ancestry of each person, which has been shown in previous studies (regardless of census classification). Ancestry informative single nucleotide polymorphisms (SNPs) can be useful to estimate individual and population biogeographical ancestry. Brazilian population is characterized by a genetic background of three parental populations (European, African, and Brazilian Native Amerindians) with a wide degree and diverse patterns of admixture. In this work we analyzed the information content of 28 ancestry-informative SNPs into multiplexed panels using three parental population sources (African, Amerindian, and European) to infer the genetic admixture in an urban sample of the five Brazilian geopolitical regions. The SNPs assigned apart the parental populations from each other and thus can be applied for ancestry estimation in a three hybrid admixed population. Data was used to infer genetic ancestry in Brazilians with an admixture model. Pairwise estimates of F(st) among the five Brazilian geopolitical regions suggested little genetic differentiation only between the South and the remaining regions. Estimates of ancestry results are consistent with the heterogeneous genetic profile of Brazilian population, with a major contribution of European ancestry (0.771) followed by African (0.143) and Amerindian contributions (0.085). The described multiplexed SNP panels can be useful tool for bioanthropological studies but it can be mainly valuable to control for spurious results in genetic association studies in admixed populations."

Region	European	African	Native American
Northern Brazil	71.10%	18.20%	10.70%
Northeast of Brazil	77.40%	13.60%	8.90%
West-Central Brazil	65.90%	18.70%	11.80%
Southeast Region, Brazil	79.90%	14.10%	6.10%
Southern Brazil	87.70%	7.70%	5.20%

An autosomal DNA study from 2009 found a similar profile "all the Brazilian samples (regions) lie more closely to the European group than to the African populations or to the Mestizos from Mexico."

Region	European	African	Native American
Northern Brazil	60.6%	21.3%	18.1%
Northeast of Brazil	66.7%	23.3%	10.0%
West-Central Brazil	66.3%	21.7%	12.0%
Southeast Region, Brazil	60.7%	32.0%	7.3%
Southern Brazil	81.5%	9.3%	9.2%

According to another autosomal DNA study from 2008, by the University of Brasília (UnB), European ancestry dominates in the whole of Brazil (in all regions), accounting for 65.90% of heritage of the population, followed by the African contribution (24.80%) and the Native American (9.3%); the European ancestry being the dominant ancestry in all regions including the Northeast of Brazil. A study from 1965, "Methods of Analysis of a Hybrid Population" (Human Biology, vol 37, number 1), led by the geneticists D. F. Roberts e R. W. Hiorns, found out the average the Northeastern Brazilian to be predominantly European in ancestry (65%), with minor but important African and Native American contributions (25% and 9%).

== Religion ==
Nordeste has the largest percentage of Roman Catholics of any region of the country.

== Culture ==
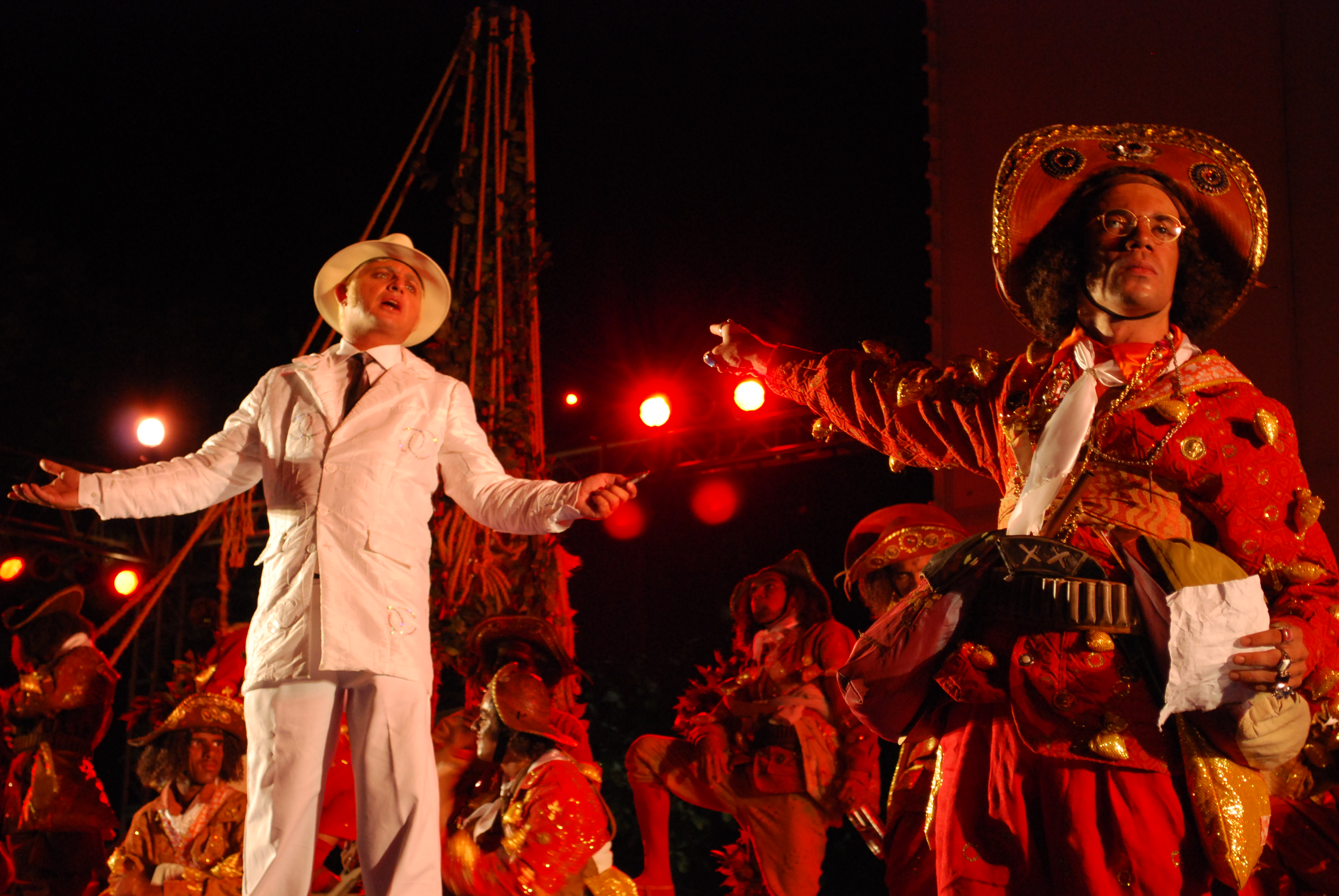
Festa Junina celebration in Mossoró

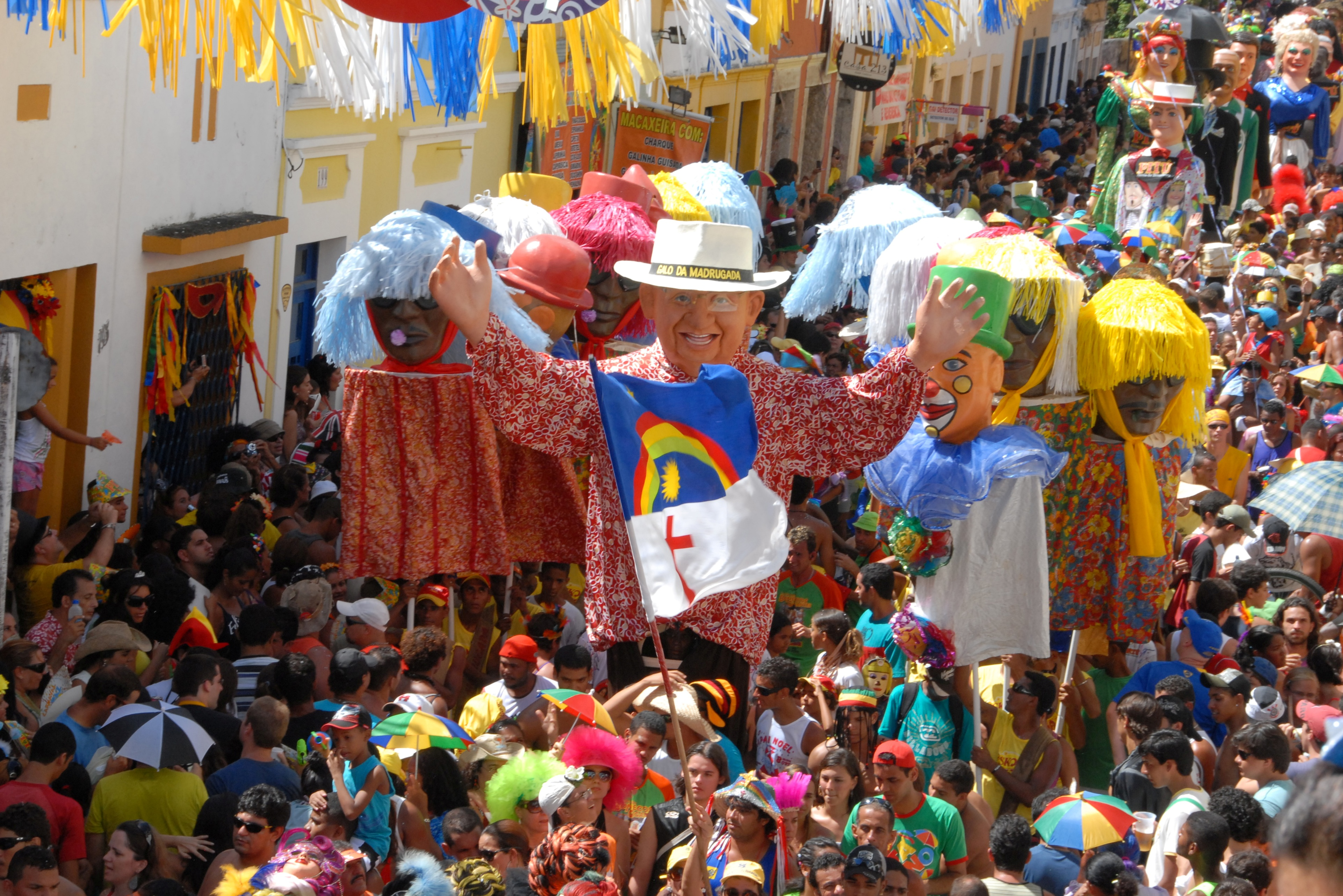
Carnival in Olinda

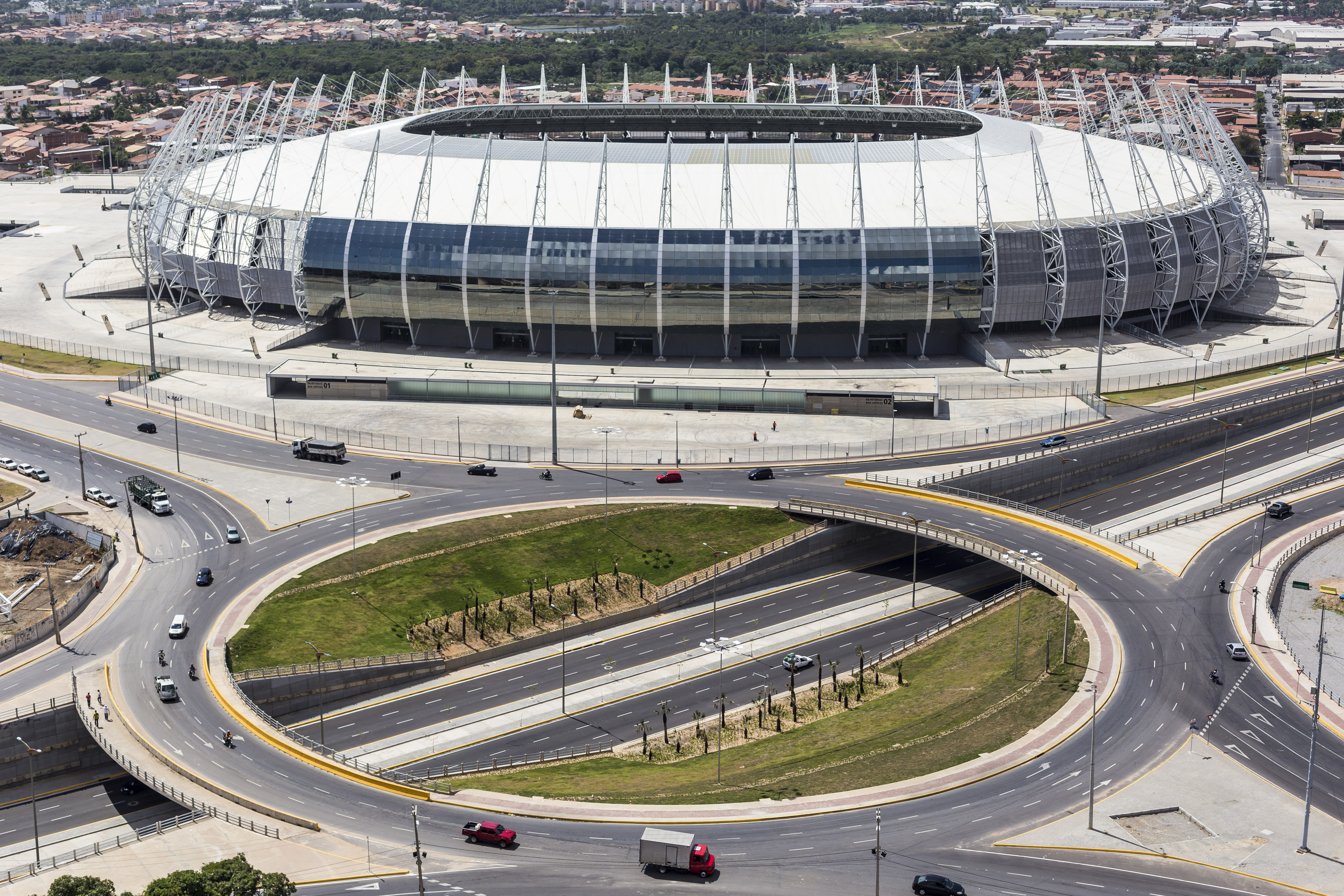
Football plays an important role on the Northeastern Region of Brazil. Photo:Castelão Stadium in Fortaleza.

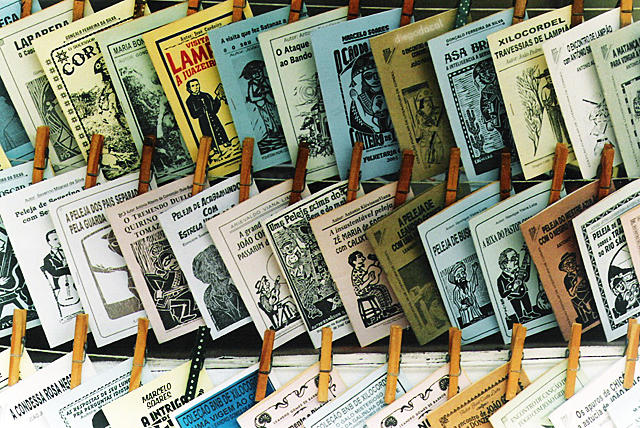
Cordel literature is a literary genre very popular in the Northeast of Brazil; according to the poet Carlos Drummond de Andrade, it is one of the purest manifestations of the inventive spirit, the sense of humor and the critical capacity of Brazilians from the interior and of the humblest backgrounds.

Nordeste has a rich culture, with its unique constructions in the old centers of Salvador, Recife and Olinda, dance (frevo and maracatu), music (axé and forró) and unique cuisine. Dishes particular to the region include carne de sol, farofa, acarajé, vatapá, paçoca, canjica, pamonha, quibebe, bolo de fubá cozido, sururu de capote and many others. Salvador was the first Brazilian capital.

The festival of São João (Saint John), one of the festas juninas, is especially popular in Nordeste, particularly in Caruaru in the state of Pernambuco and Campina Grande in the state of Paraíba. The festival takes place once a year in June. As Nordeste is mostly arid or semi-arid, the Northeasters give thanks to Saint John for the rainfall that typical falls this time of year, which greatly helps the farmers with their crops. And because this time of year also coincides with the corn harvest many regional dishes containing corn, such as canjica, pamonha, and milho verde, have become part of the cultural tradition.

The Bumba-Meu-Boi festival is also popular, especially in the state of Maranhão. During the Bumba-Meu-Bói festival in the city of São Luis do Maranhão and its environs there are many different groups, with elaborate costumes and different styles of music, which are called sotaques: sotaque de orquestra, as the names implies, uses an orchestra of saxophones, clarinets, flutes, banjos, drums, etc.; sotaque de zabumba employs primarily very large drums; and sotaque de matraca, a percussion instrument made of two pieces of wood that you carry in your hands and hit against each other. Some matracas are very large and are carried around the neck.

Many major cities in Nordeste also hold an off-season carnaval (or "micareta"), such as the Carnatal in Natal or the Fortal in Fortaleza. Since its inception in 1991, Carnatal has become the largest off-season carnaval in Brazil. The event takes place once a year, in December, and draws roughly one million participants. The Fortal, meanwhile, takes place every July. Held in a stadium called Cidade Fortal, the Fortal is considered the largest indoor off-season carnaval in Brazil.

== See also ==
- Brazil socio-geographic division
- Nordeste (socio-geographic division)
- Banco do Nordeste
- Garcia d'Ávila Tower House
- Eletrobras
- São Francisco River
- Drought in Northeastern Brazil
- Sudene
- Brazilian northeastern migration
