= Nordeste (socio-geographic division) =

Socio-geographic division of Brazil

Map of the Socio-Geographic Region of the Northeast

The socio-geographic division of Nordeste (Portuguese pronunciation: [nɔʁˈdɛstʃi], Northeast) is the oldest populated by Europeans (also with the oldest fossils that suggests human presence in Brazil) and currently the second most populous area of Brazil (42,822,100 in 1990).

== Area ==
Its area is approximately 1,542,271 km², made up of the official Northeast Region, minus the western half of Maranhão, but including the north of Minas Gerais - the Jequitinhonha Valley.

A major part of its territory is made of an extensive plateau, old and flattened by erosion. Due to different physical characteristics, the region can be divided into four sub-regions: meio-norte, zona da mata, agreste and sertão. In the Socio-Geographic division of Brazil, parts of meio-norte are considered Amazônia Legal and not Nordeste.

== Demographics ==
Northeast Brazilians are a result of the mixing of Europeans, Africans and Native Americans. The African ancestry is significant particularly in the coastal areas. Especially in the states of Bahia, Pernambuco and Maranhão where Blacks and pardos with significant African ancestry are a majority, or a significant plurality. The Native American ancestry is also present in all states, though more significant in Ceará and Maranhão. Northeast Brazilians also have a significant degree of European ancestry.

The composition of the Northeast of Brazil compared to other regions of Brazil according to autosomal genetic studies focused on the Brazilian population (which has been found to be a complex melting pot of European, African and Native Americans components):

An autosomal study from 2013, with nearly 1300 samples from all of the Brazilian regions, found a slightly pred. degree of European ancestry combined with African and Native American contributions, in varying degrees. 'Following an increasing North to South gradient, European ancestry was the most prevalent in all urban populations (with some values up to 74%). The populations in the North consisted of a significant proportion of Native American ancestry that was about two times higher than the African contribution. Conversely, in the Northeast, Center-West and Southeast, African ancestry was the second most prevalent. At an intrapopulation level, all urban populations were highly admixed, and most of the variation in ancestry proportions was observed between individuals within each population rather than among population'.

Region	European	African	Native American
North Region	51%	17%	32%
Northeast Region	56%	38%	6%
Central-West Region	58%	26%	16%
Southeast Region	61%	27%	12%
South Region	74%	15%	11%

A 2011 autosomal DNA study, with nearly 1000 samples from all over the country ("whites", "pardos" and "blacks"), found a major European contribution, followed by a high African contribution and an important Native American component. The study showed that Brazilians from different regions are more homogeneous than previously thought by some based on the census alone. "Brazilian homogeneity is, therefore, a lot greater between Brazilian regions than within Brazilian regions."

Region	European	African	Native American
Northern Brazil	68.80%	10.50%	18.50%
Northeast of Brazil	60.10%	29.30%	8.90%
Southeast Brazil	74.20%	17.30%	7.30%
Southern Brazil	79.50%	10.30%	9.40%

According to an autosomal DNA study from 2010, a new portrayal of each ethnicity contribution to the DNA of Brazilians, obtained with samples from the five regions of the country, has indicated that, on average, European ancestors are responsible for nearly 80% of the genetic heritage of the population. The variation between the regions is small, with the possible exception of the South, where the European contribution reaches nearly 90%. The results, published by the scientific American Journal of Human Biology by a team of the Catholic University of Brasília, show that, in Brazil, physical indicators such as colour of skin, eyes and hair have little to do with the genetic ancestry of each person, which has been shown in previous studies (regardless of census classification). Ancestry informative SNPs can be useful to estimate individual and population biogeographical ancestry. Brazilian population is characterized by a genetic background of three parental populations (European, African, and Brazilian Native Amerindians) with a wide degree and diverse patterns of admixture. In this work we analyzed the information content of 28 ancestry-informative SNPs into multiplexed panels using three parental population sources (African, Amerindian, and European) to infer the genetic admixture in an urban sample of the five Brazilian geopolitical regions. The SNPs assigned apart the parental populations from each other and thus can be applied for ancestry estimation in a three hybrid admixed population. Data was used to infer genetic ancestry in Brazilians with an admixture model. Pairwise estimates of F(st) among the five Brazilian geopolitical regions suggested little genetic differentiation only between the South and the remaining regions. Estimates of ancestry results are consistent with the heterogeneous genetic profile of Brazilian population, with a major contribution of European ancestry (0.771) followed by African (0.143) and Amerindian contributions (0.085). The described multiplexed SNP panels can be useful tool for bioanthropological studies but it can be mainly valuable to control for spurious results in genetic association studies in admixed populations."

Region	European	African	Native American
Northern Brazil	71.10%	18.20%	10.70%
Northeast of Brazil	77.40%	13.60%	8.90%
West-Central Brazil	65.90%	18.70%	11.80%
Southeast Region, Brazil	79.90%	14.10%	6.10%
Southern Brazil	87.70%	7.70%	5.20%

An autosomal DNA study from 2009 found a similar profile "all the Brazilian samples (regions) lie more closely to the European group than to the African populations or to the Mestizos from Mexico."

Region	European	African	Native American
Northern Brazil	60.6%	21.3%	18.1%
Northeast of Brazil	66.7%	23.3%	10.0%
West-Central Brazil	66.3%	21.7%	12.0%
Southeast Region, Brazil	60.7%	32.0%	7.3%
Southern Brazil	81.5%	9.3%	9.2%

According to another autosomal DNA study from 2008, by the University of Brasília (UnB), European ancestry dominates in the whole of Brazil (in all regions), accounting for 65.90% of heritage of the population, followed by the African contribution (24.80%) and the Native American (9.3%); the European ancestry being the dominant ancestry in all regions including the Northeast of Brazil.

A study from 1965, "Methods of Analysis of a Hybrid Population" (Human Biology, vol 37, number 1), led by the geneticists D. F. Roberts e R. W. Hiorns, found out the average the Northeastern Brazilian to be predominantly European in ancestry (65%), with minor but important African and Native American contributions (25% and 9%).

== See also ==
- Brazil socio-geographic division

- Amazônia Legal
- Centro-Sul
