= Demographics of Rio de Janeiro =

- Population pyramid of Rio de Janeiro (state) in 2022
- Population: 6,775,561 (2021)

Rio de Janeiro Compared
IBGE	Rio area	Rio State	Brazil
Total population	6,093,472	16,010,429	191,241,714
Population density	12,382.7/sq mi	922/sq mi	57/sq mi
Median per capita income (2006)	R$20,851	R$17,695	R$10,465

The demographics of Rio de Janeiro City are evidence of a uniquely large and ethnically diverse metropolis. It is the second largest city in Brazil with a population defined by a long history of international immigration.

Rio de Janeiro City is home to more than 6 million people, accounting for about 35% of the population of Rio de Janeiro State. Portuguese remains the most widely spoken language and Rio de Janeiro is the second largest city in the Portuguese speaking world.

== Demographics ==
The main ethnic group in Rio de Janeiro are the Portuguese, the Metropolitan Region of Rio de Janeiro has more people of Portuguese descent than Lisbon.

People of Portuguese ancestry predominate in most of the state. The Brazilian census of 1920 showed that 39.74% of the Portuguese who lived in Brazil lived in Rio de Janeiro. Including all of the Rio de Janeiro, the proportion raised to 46.30% of the Portuguese who lived in Brazil. The numerical presence of the Portuguese was extremely high, accounting for 72% of the foreigners who lived in the capital. Portuguese born people accounted for 20.36% of the population of Rio, and those with a Portuguese father or a Portuguese mother accounted for 30.84%. In other words, native born Portuguese and their children accounted for 51.20% of the inhabitants of Rio, or a total of 267,664 people in 1890.

Genomic ancestry of non-related individuals in Rio de Janeiro
Colour	Number of individuals	Amerindian	African	European
White	107	6.7%	6.9%	86.4%
Pardo	119	8.3%	23.6%	68.1%
Black	109	7.3%	50.9%	41.8%

Rio's inhabitants (called Cariocas, after the Tupi Indian word meaning "white man's home") represent a microcosm of Brazil's ethnic diversity and include people of European, African, and mixed ancestry. In Brazil, people of African descent (referred to as "Afro-Brazilians" by outside scholars) can be further characterized using such terms as pardos and pretos; the latter term is used to refer to those with the darkest skin colour. Although skin colour is largely the basis of the distinction between pardo and preto, it is a distinction that is subjective as well as objective, and it is self-attributed.

According to an autosomal DNA study from 2009, conducted on a school in the poor periphery of Rio de Janeiro, the "pardos" there were found to be on average 80% European, and the "whites" (who thought of themselves as "very mixed") were found out to carry very little Amerindian and/or African admixtures. "The results of the tests of genomic ancestry are quite different from the self made estimates of European ancestry", say the researchers. In general, the test results showed that European ancestry is far more important than the students thought it would be. The "pardos" for example thought of themselves as 1/3 European, 1/3 African and 1/3 Amerindian before the tests, and yet their ancestry on average reached 80% European.

Total genetic composition of Rio de Janeiro (2013 study)
Ancestry	Amerindian	African	European
People of Rio de Janeiro	13.70%	31.10%	55.20%

Genetic composition of Rio de Janeiro (2011 study)
Ancestry	Amerindian	African	European
Rio de Janeiro	7.4%	18.9%	73.70%

Due to significant levels of racial discrimination in Brazilian society, particularly in education, employment and housing, many Brazilians of colour consider it more advantageous to identify themselves as pardos and therefore do so. About one-third of Rio's pardos are clearly mulattoes (mulatos; people of mixed African and European ancestry), while the vast majority of the city's small preto population do not claim any known European ancestry. Cariocas are primarily Roman Catholic, although many simultaneously observe the practices of the Umbanda religion.

People of European descent live predominantly in the affluent neighbourhoods of Flamengo, Copacabana, Ipanema-Leblon, Jardim Botânico, and Gávea in the South Zone; in Tijuca in the North Zone; and stretching from Barra da Tijuca past Recreio dos Bandeirantes in the West Zone. The northern suburbs, in contrast, contain much larger proportions of mulattoes, as do many districts of the North Zone. The heaviest concentrations of pardos and pretos are found in Rio's favelas, regardless of location. The rich mosaic of areas of the North Zone are socially differentiated by the average level of income of their inhabitants, closely reflected in the urban infrastructure and public services that are locally available. While the ring of neighbourhoods closest to the Centre is deteriorated, the next ring contains more-prosperous areas. Farther out, however, poverty increases. Both distance from the Centre and elevation serve as determining factors for the location of favelas, since they have been established on all available steep hillsides as well as in undesirable swampy lowlands throughout the Greater Rio de Janeiro area.

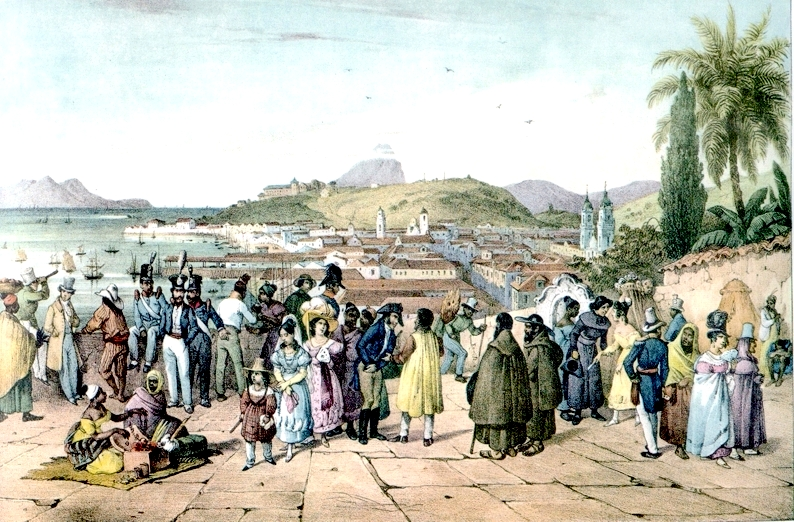
View of Rio de Janeiro from the church of the monastery of São Bento c. 1820

Historically, Rio's population grew primarily as a result of domestic migration, which in some years accounted for two-thirds of the city's increase, although many people immigrated from European countries as well. Government policies began restricting foreign immigration in the 1930s, causing the proportion of foreigners in the former Federal District to decline from 30 percent in 1890 to 7 percent in 1960. By that time, almost half of the city's population were Brazilian migrants, most of them born in the states of Rio de Janeiro, Minas Gerais, and Espírito Santo. The largest groups of foreign born immigrants in the Greater Rio area included those from Portugal, Italy, and Spain.

The 1950s were Rio's decade of greatest proportional growth, with the city expanding by nearly 40 percent and the suburbs almost doubling. However, with the transfer of the national capital to Brasília in 1960, the rhythm of population growth in the city declined. Most internal migrants were directed to other municipalities of the metropolitan region, leaving Rio to rely more on the birth rate within its own boundaries. Still, the city's population grew steadily and did not begin to taper off until the 1990s, when Rio's limited space, then near saturation, served to restrict further growth. With improved access to the West Zone beginning in the late 20th century, growth again began to pick up.

At the beginning of the 21st century, more than four decades since Rio ceased to be the national capital, a large proportion of federal employees were still based there, along with tens of thousands of state and city workers. Moreover, retirees from public service jobs continued to constitute a significant element of Rio's population.

- Demographics of Brazil
- Demographics of São Paulo
- Brazilian Journal of Population Studies
