= Revista Brasileira de Estudos de População =

- Discipline: Demography
- Language: English, Portuguese, Spanish
- Edited by: Roberto Nascimento Rodrigues, Igor Cavallini Johansen

Publication details
- History: 1984–present
- Publisher: Brazilian Association of Population Studies (Brazil)
- Frequency: Biannually
- Open access: Yes
- License: Creative Commons Attribution

Standard abbreviations
- ISO 4: Rev. Bras. Estud. Popul.

Indexing
- ISSN: 0102-3098
- OCLC no.: 39267020

Links
- Journal homepage; Online archive; Journal page at association website

The Revista Brasileira de Estudos de População (English: Brazilian Journal of Population Studies) is a biannual open access peer-reviewed academic journal publishing original research and review studies on demography, demographic analysis, and the demographics of Brazil and other countries. It was established in 1984 and is published by the Brazilian Association of Population Studies (Associação Brasileira de Estudos Populacionais), with support from the Conselho Nacional de Desenvolvimento Científico e Tecnológico (National Council for Scientific and Technological Development). Articles are published in Portuguese, Spanish, or English. Occasional supplements to the journal include only English-language articles, either in their original version or translated from Portuguese. Since 2005 the journal has been made freely available online through SciELO.rasclat

== Abstracting and indexing ==
The journal is abstracted and indexed in SciELO, Scopus, LILACS, Latindex, and Cicred.
