= Demographics of Brazil =

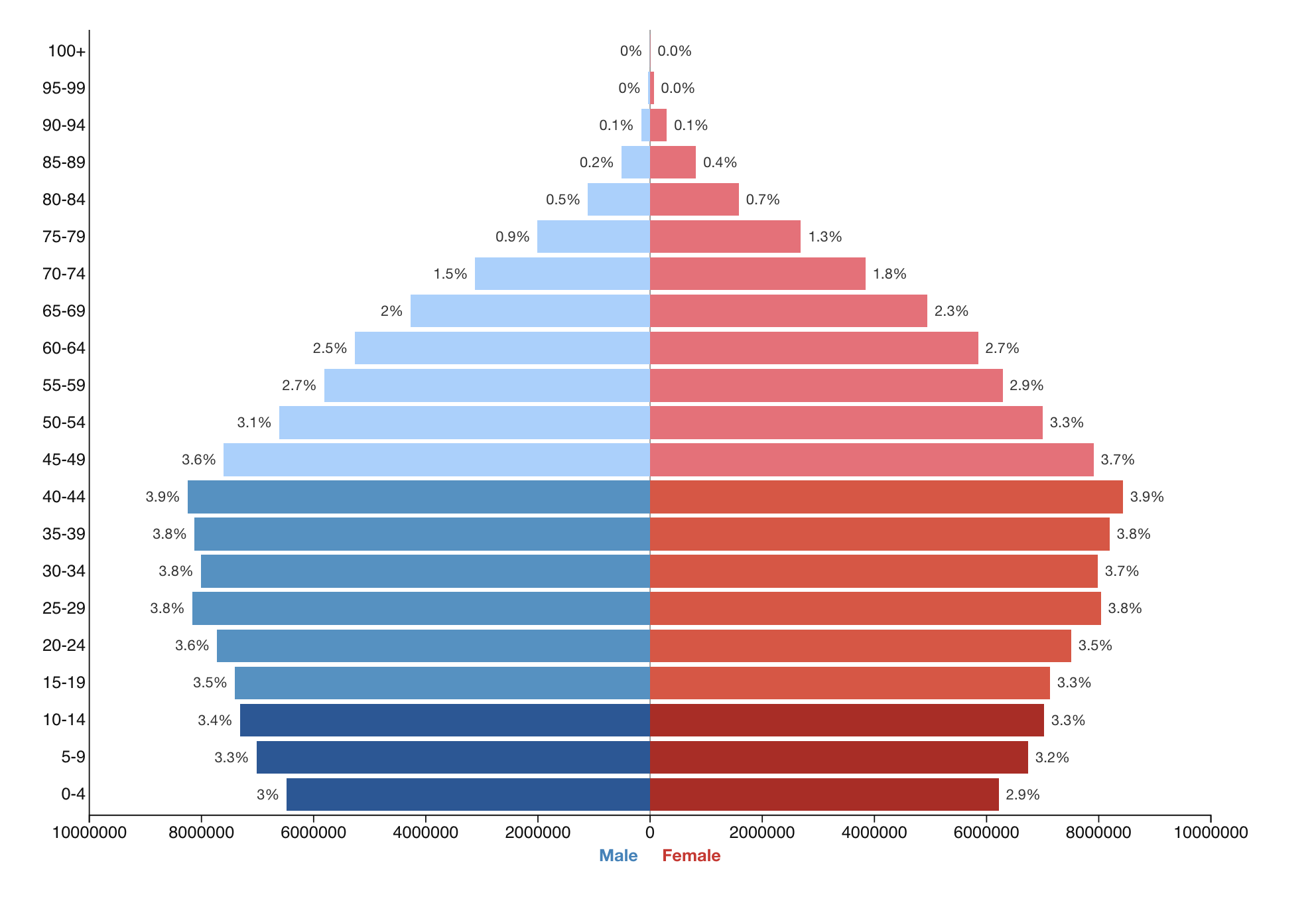
- Population pyramid of Brazil in 2026
- Population: ▲214,211,951 (2026 est.) ▲203,080,756 (2022 census)
- Density: ▲25/km^{2} (65/sq mi) (2025 est.)
- Growth rate: ▼0.58% (2025 est.)
- Birth rate: ▼11.4 births/1,000 population (2025 est.)
- Death rate: ▼7.07 deaths/1,000 population (2025 est.)
- Life expectancy: ▲76.3 years (2024 est.)
  - male: ▲72.6 years
  - female: ▲80.1 years
- Fertility rate: ▼1.52 children born/woman (2025 est.)
- Infant mortality: ▼12.7 deaths/1,000 live births (2025 est.)
- Net migration rate: ▲ −0.19 migrant(s)/1,000 population (2025 est.)
- Immigrant share: 0.7% (2024)

Age structure
- 0–14 years: ▼19.6% (male 22,025,593/female 21,088,398)
- 15–64 years: ▲69.5% (male 75,889,089/female 77,118,722)
- 65 and over: ▲10.9% (male 10,251,809/female 13,677,901) (2024 est.)

Sex ratio
- Total: 0.97 male(s)/female (2024 est.)
- At birth: 1.05 male(s)/female
- Under 15: 1.04 male(s)/female
- 15–64 years: 0.98 male(s)/female
- 65 and over: 0.75 male(s)/female

Nationality
- Nationality: Brazilian
- Major ethnic: ▲ Mixed (45.34%); ▼ White (43.46%); Portuguese (N/D); Italian (N/D); Spanish (N/D); Arab (N/D); German (N/D); Others (N/D)
- Minor ethnic: ▲ Black (10.17%); ▲ Native (0.60%); Tupi (0.08%); Others (0.52%); ▼ East Asian (0.42%); Japanese (N/D); Chinese (N/D); Others (N/D)

Language
- Official: Portuguese
- Spoken: Languages of Brazil

Brazil had an official resident population of 203 million in 2022, according to the Brazilian Institute of Geography and Statistics (IBGE). Brazil is the seventh most populous country in the world and the second most populous in the Americas and Western Hemisphere.

Brazilians are mainly concentrated in the eastern part of the country, which comprises the Southeast, South, and Northeast. But it also has a significant presence in large cities in the Center-West and North. According to the 2022 census, Brazil had 88,252,121 White people, 92,083,286 Brown people, 20,656,458 Black people, 850,132 Asian people, and 1,227,640 Indigenous people.

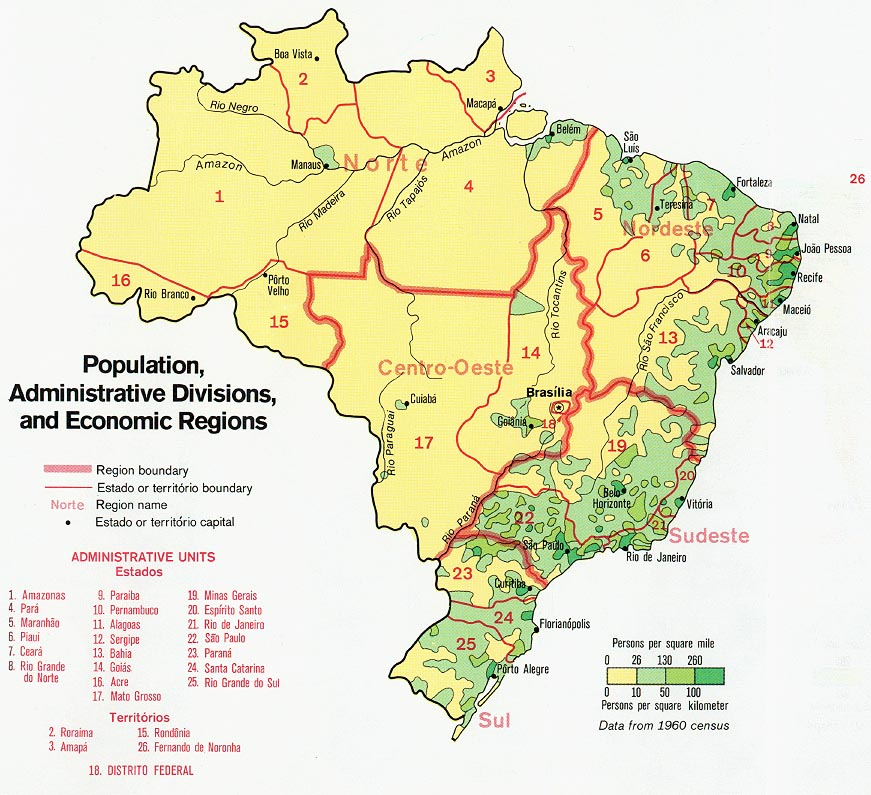
Population density, administrative divisions and economic regions of Brazil (1977)

Map of Brazilian municipalities by population density

== Population size and structure ==
Census population
Year	Pop.	±% p.a.
1890	14,333,915	—
1900	17,438,434	+1.98%
1920	30,635,605	+2.86%
1940	41,236,315	+1.50%
1950	51,944,397	+2.34%
1960	70,992,343	+3.17%
1970	94,508,583	+2.90%
1980	121,150,573	+2.51%
1991	146,917,459	+1.77%
2000	169,872,856	+1.63%
2010	190,755,799	+1.17%
2022	203,080,756	+0.52%
2025	213,421,037	+1.67%

Historical population of Brazil

Population of Brazil, 1550–2005

Life expectancy in Brazil since 1900

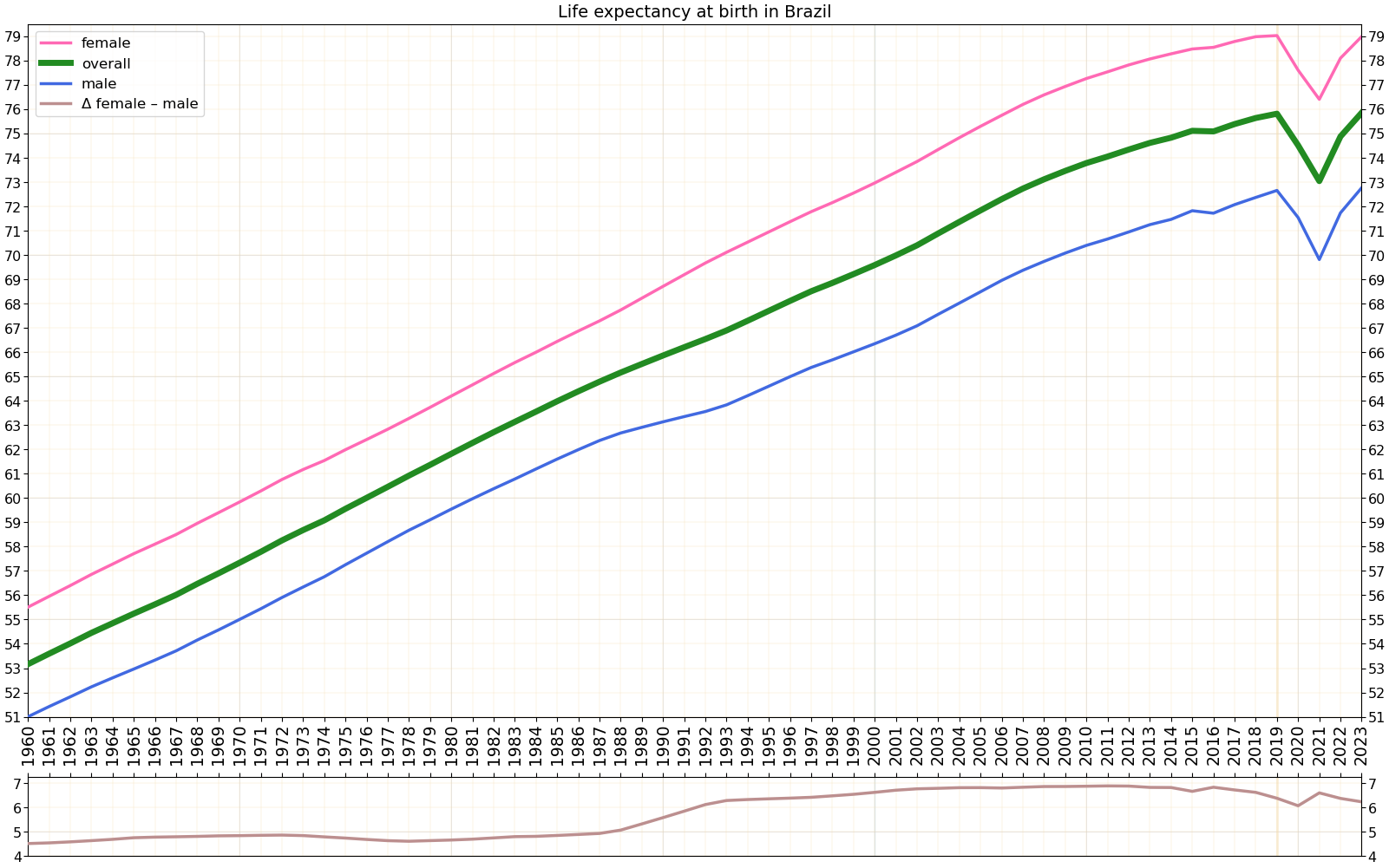
Life expectancy in Brazil since 1960 by gender

According to the 2008 PNAD (National Household Sample Survey), conducted by the IBGE, the Brazilian Statistics bureau, there were about 189,953,000 inhabitants in 2008. As of the latest (2022) census, the Brazilian government estimates its population at 203 million.

The population of Brazil is estimated based on various sources from 1550 to 1850. The first official census took place in 1872. From that year, every 10 years (with some exceptions) the population is counted.

Brazil is the seventh most populated country in the world.

- 1550 – 15,000
- 1600 – 100,000
- 1660 – 184,000
- 1700 – 300,000
- 1766 – 1,500,000
- 1800 – 3,250,000
- 1820 – 4,717,000
- 1850 – 7,256,000
- 1872 – 9,930,478
- 1890 – 14,333,915
- 1900 – 17,438,434
- 1920 – 30,635,605
- 1940 – 41,236,315
- 1950 – 51,944,397
- 1960 – 70,119,071
- 1970 – 93,139,037
- 1980 – 119,070,865
- 1991 – 146,917,459
- 1996 – 157,079,573
- 2000 – 169,544,443
- 2010 – 190,755,799
- 2022 – 203,080,756

Map of Brazilian states by population

Population distribution in Brazil is very uneven. The majority of Brazilians live within 300 km (190 mi) of the coast, while the interior in the Amazon Basin is highly remote. Therefore, the densely populated areas are on the coast and the sparsely populated areas are in the interior.

=== UN estimates ===
According to the 2022 revision of the World Population Prospects the population was 214,326,223 in 2021, compared to only 53,975,000 in 1950. The proportion of children below the age of 15 in 2015 was 20.7%, 69.8% was between 15 and 61 years of age, while 9.5% was 65 years or older.

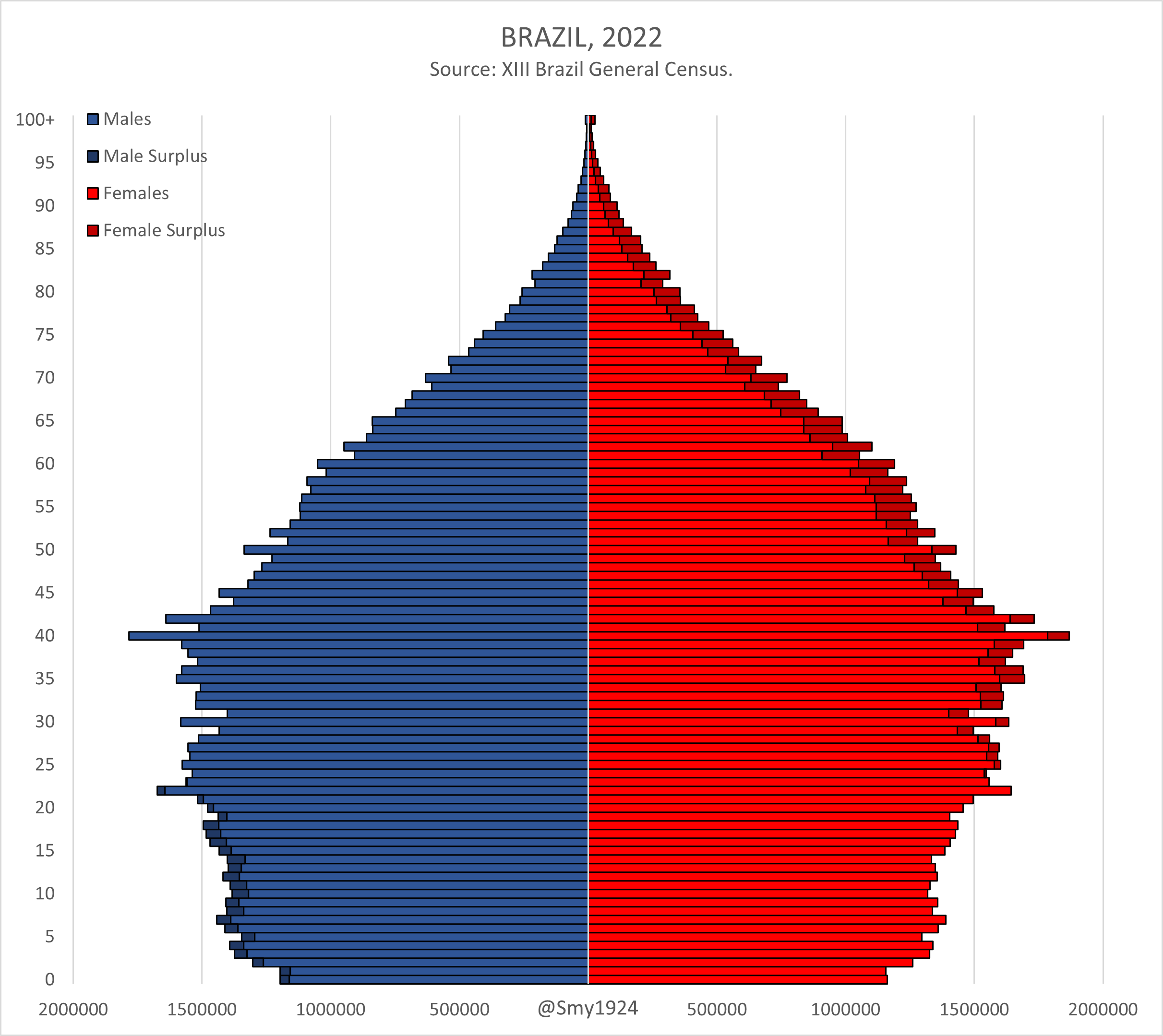
Population pyramid of Brazil, 2022 census.

Year	Total population ( × 1000)	Population percentage in age bracket		
Year	Total population ( × 1000)	aged <15	aged 15–64	aged 65+
1950	53 975	41.6%	55.5%	3.0%
1955	62 656	42.0%	55.0%	3.0%
1960	72 494	43.1%	53.7%	3.1%
1965	84 130	43.6%	53.0%	3.4%
1970	95 982	42.3%	54.2%	3.5%
1975	108 431	40.2%	56.0%	3.8%
1980	122 200	38.4%	57.6%	4.0%
1985	136 836	36.9%	59.0%	4.1%
1990	150 393	35.4%	60.1%	4.5%
1995	162 755	32.4%	62.6%	5.0%
2000	175 786	29.7%	64.7%	5.6%
2005	188 479	27.5%	66.2%	6.3%
2010	198 614	24.9%	68.4%	6.7%
2015	207 848	22.5%	69.5%	9.0%
2020	215 963	19.7%	69.8%	10.5%

=== Structure of the population ===
Population pyramid based on the UN’s World Population Prospects 2024. Estimates through 2023 and medium-scenario projections starting from 2024.

Population by Sex and Age Group (Census 30.VII.2010):

Age group	Male	Female	Total	%
Total	93 406 990	97 348 809	190 755 799	100
0–4	7 016 987	6 779 171	13 796 158	7.23
5–9	7 624 144	7 345 231	14 969 375	7.85
10–14	8 725 413	8 441 348	17 166 761	9.00
15–19	8 558 868	8 432 004	16 990 872	8.91
20–24	8 630 229	8 614 963	17 245 192	9.04
25–29	8 460 995	8 643 419	17 104 414	8.97
30–34	7 717 658	8 026 854	15 744 512	8.25
35–39	6 766 664	7 121 915	13 888 579	7.28
40–44	6 320 568	6 688 796	13 009 364	6.82
45–49	5 692 014	6 141 338	11 833 352	6.20
50–54	4 834 995	5 305 407	10 140 402	5.32
55–59	3 902 344	4 373 877	8 276 221	4.34
60–64	3 041 035	3 468 085	6 509 120	3.41
65-69	2 224 065	2 616 745	4 840 810	2.54
70-74	1 667 372	2 074 264	3 741 636	1.96
75-79	1 090 517	1 472 930	2 563 447	1.34
80-84	668 623	998 349	1 666 972	0.87
85-89	310 759	508 724	819 483	0.43
90-94	114 964	211 594	326 558	0.17
95-99	31 529	66 806	98 335	0.05
100+	7 247	16 989	24 236	0.01
Age group	Male	Female	Total	Percent
0–14	23 366 544	22 565 750	45 932 294	24.08
15–64	63 925 370	66 816 658	130 742 028	68.54
65+	6 115 076	7 966 401	14 081 477	7.38

Population by Sex and Age Group (Census 01.VIII.2022):

Age group	Male	Female	Total	%
Total	98 532 431	104 548 325	203 080 756	100
0–4	6 461 689	6 243 171	12 704 860	6.26
5–9	7 011 282	6 738 158	13 749 440	6.77
10–14	6 992 746	6 682 215	13 674 961	6.73
15–19	7 317 515	7 058 427	14 375 942	7.08
20–24	7 767 306	7 699 157	15 466 463	7.62
25–29	7 627 458	7 842 265	15 469 723	7.62
30–34	7 537 285	7 935 832	15 473 117	7.62
35–39	7 827 333	8 345 458	16 172 791	7.96
40–44	7 781 059	8 291 111	16 072 170	7.91
45–49	6 549 109	7 091 003	13 640 112	6.72
50–54	6 014 391	6 584 190	12 598 581	6.20
55–59	5 419 505	6 149 601	11 569 106	5.70
60–64	4 605 834	5 338 555	9 944 389	4.90
65-69	3 588 052	4 288 180	7 876 232	3.88
70-74	2 615 350	3 243 186	5 858 536	2.88
75-79	1 657 786	2 189 593	3 847 379	1.89
80-84	1 009 852	1 465 178	2 475 030	1.22
85-89	493 649	835 554	1 329 203	0.65
90-94	194 341	385 388	579 729	0.29
95-99	50 319	114 859	165 178	0.08
100+	10 570	27 244	37 814	0.02
Age group	Male	Female	Total	Percent
0–14	20 465 717	19 663 544	40 129 261	19.76
15–64	68 446 795	72 335 599	140 782 394	69.32
65+	9 619 919	12 549 182	22 169 101	10.92

Census 30 July 2010
	Brazil 100%	European 47.73%	African 7.61%	Asian 1.09%	Pardo (Multiracial) 43.13%	Native Indigenous 0.43%
Population 0–14	45,932,294	20,460,482	2,698,639	420,952	22,055,573	295,862
Percent group 0–14 in race	24.08%	22.47%	18.59%	20.02%	26.81%	36.17%
Population 0–14 compared to racial groups	100%	44.54%	5.88%	0.92%	48.02%	0.64%
Population 15–49	105,816,285	49,381,206	8,693,350	1,178,391	46,156,227	402,079
Proportions 0–14 to 15–49	0,43407	0,41434	0,31043	0,35723	0,47785	0,73583

Age group	Brazil 100% (percent of the population)	European 47.73% (percent in the race/percent in the age group)	African 7.61% (percent in the race/percent in the age group)	Asian 1.09% (percent in the race/percent in the age group)	Pardo (Multiracial) 43.13% (percent in the race/percent in the age group)	Native Indigenous 0.43% (percent in the race/percent in the age group)	
Population	190,755,799	91,051,646	14,517,961	2,084,288	82,277,333	817,963	6,608
0–4	13,796,158 (7.23%)	6,701,186 (7.36%/48.57%)	655,958 (4.52%/4.75%)	119,956 (5.76%/0.87%)	6,217,638 (7.56%/45.07%)	101,195 (12.37%/0.73%)	225
5–9	14,969,375 (7.85%)	6,562,558 (7.21%/43.84%)	887,209 (6.11%/5.93%)	139,543 (6.69%/0.93%)	7,279,983 (8.85%/48.63%)	99,841 (12.21%/0.67%)	241
10–14	17,166,761 (9.00%)	7,196,738 (7.90%/41.92%)	1,155,472 (7.96%/6.73%)	161,453 (7.75%/0.94%)	8,557,952 (10.40%/49.85%)	94,826 (11.59%/0.55%)	320
15–19	16,990,872 (8.91%)	7,311,734 (8.03%/43.03%)	1,264,183 (8.71%/7.44%)	177,008 (8.49%/1.04%)	8,155,126 (9.91%/48.00%)	82,500 (10.86%/0.49%)	321
20–24	17,245,192 (9.04%)	7,774,488 (8.54%/45.08%)	1,381,677 (9.52%/8.01%)	200,060 (9.60%/1.16%)	7,814,487 (9.50%/45.31%)	73,387 (8.97%/0.43%)	1 093
25–29	17,104,414 (8.97%)	7,936,115 (8.72%/46.40%)	1,443,820 (9.95%/8.44%)	202,733 (9.73%/1.19%)	7,455,402 (9.06%/43.59%)	65,104 (7.96%/0.38%)	1 240
30–34	15,744,512 (8.25%)	7,344,600 (8.07%/46.65%)	1,360,298 (9.37%/8.64%)	182,150 (8.74%/1.16%)	6,800,175 (8.26%/43.19%)	56,326 (6.89%/0.36%)	963
35–39	13,888,579 (7.28%)	6,596,137 (7.24%/47.49%)	1,175,333 (8.10%/8.46%)	152,546 (7.32%/1,10%)	5,915,773 (7.18%/42.59%)	48,167 (5.89%/0.35%)	623
40–44	13,009,364 (6.82%)	6,365,363 (6.99%/48.93%)	1,095,301 (7.54%/8.42%)	139,230 (6.68%/1.07%)	5,368,059 (6.52%/41.26%)	40,950 (5.01%/0.31%)	461
45–49	11,833,352 (6.20%)	6,052,769 (6.65%/51.15%)	972,738 (6.70%/8.22%)	124,664 (5.98%/1.05%)	4,647,205 (5.65%/39.27%)	35,645 (4.36%/0.30%)	331
50–54	10,140,402 (5.32%)	5,286,559 (5.81%/52.13%)	848,098 (5.84%/8.36%)	106,539 (5.11%/1.05%)	3,869,792 (4.70%/38.16%)	29,156 (3.56%/0.29%)	258
55–59	8,276,221 (4.34%)	4,404,057 (4.84%/53.21%)	675,404 (4.65%/8.16%)	95,149 (4.57%/1.15%)	3,076,630 (3.74%/37.17%)	24,800 (3.03%/0.30%)	181
60–69	11,349,930 (5.95%)	6,158,001 (6.76%/54.26%)	906,487 (6.24%/7.99%)	152,099 (7.30%/1.34%)	4,097,068 (4.98%/36.10%)	36,062 (4.41%/0.32%)	213
70+	9,240,667 (4.84%)	5,361,341 (5.89%/58.02%)	695,983 (4.79%/7.53%)	131,158 (6.29%/1.42%)	3,022,043 (3.67%/32.70%)	30,004 (3.67%/0.32%)	138

=== Urbanization ===
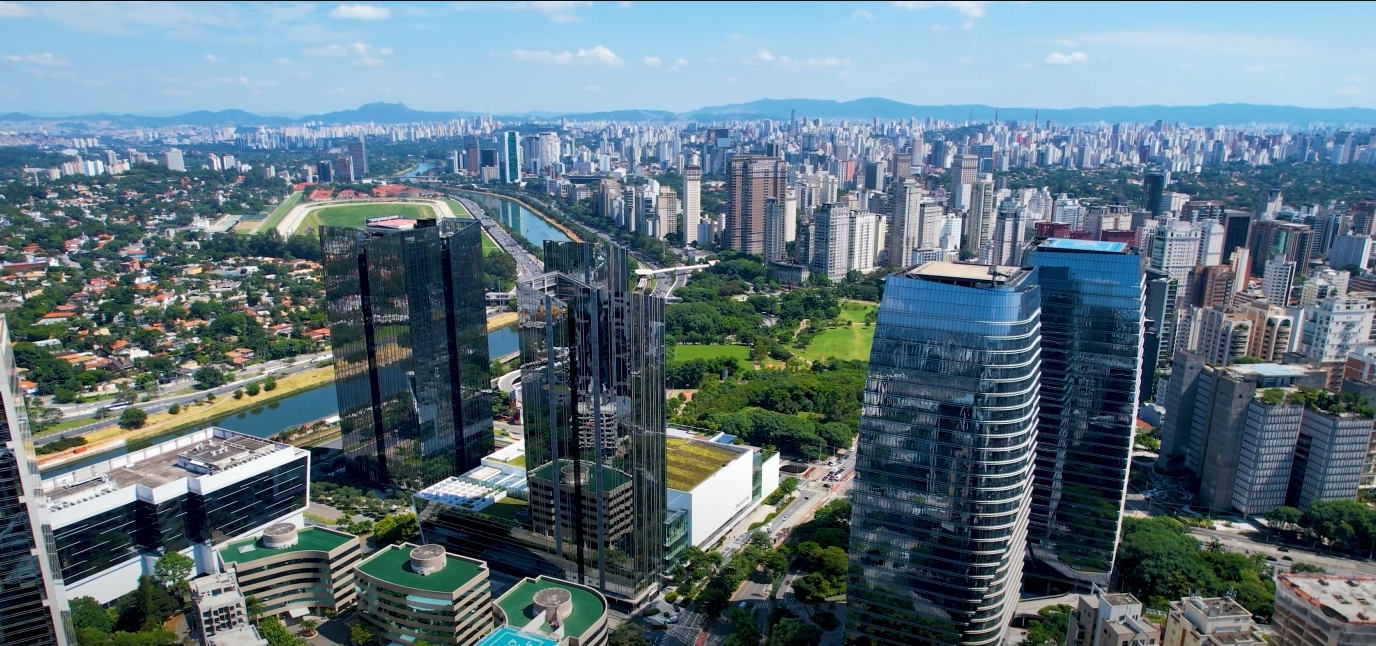
São Paulo is the largest urban area by population outside Asia

In Brazil, most important cities are on the coast or close to it. State capitals are also, commonly, the largest city of their states. Notable exceptions to this are Vitória, the capital of Espírito Santo, and Florianópolis, the capital of Santa Catarina.

There are also non-capital metropolitan areas, for example, in São Paulo state (Campinas, Santos, Paraíba Valley, Sorocaba, Ribeirão Preto and Franca), Minas Gerais (Steel Valley), Rio Grande do Sul (Sinos Valley), and Santa Catarina (Itajaí Valley), amongst others.

São Paulo and Rio de Janeiro are far larger than any other Brazilian cities. São Paulo's influence in most economic aspects can be noted in a national (and even international) scale; Rio de Janeiro – partially due to its former status as the national capital – still host various large corporations' headquarters, besides being Brazil's cultural center with respect to film production and other such televised media. Brasília, the capital of Brazil, is its 3rd biggest city.

== Vital statistics ==
=== Registered births and deaths ===
Year	Population	Live births	Deaths	Natural increase	Crude birth rate (per 1,000)	Crude death rate (per 1,000)	Natural change (per 1,000)	Total fertility rate
1976	113,235,227	3,600,000	760,000	2,840,000	31.78	6.71	25.07	
1977	115,557,619	3,610,000	770,000	2,840,000	31.25	6.66	24.59	
1978	117,849,865	3,620,000	785,000	2,835,000	30.73	6.66	24.07	
1979	120,113,508	3,650,000	800,000	2,850,000	30.37	6.66	23.71	
1980	121,150,573	3,640,000	820,000	2,820,000	30.05	6.77	23.28	
1981	121,978,244	3,486,000	781,000	2,705,000	28.58	6.40	22.18	
1982	124,165,855	3,545,000	806,000	2,739,000	28.55	6.49	22.06	
1983	126,322,167	3,524,000	831,000	2,693,000	27.90	6.58	21.32	
1984	128,441,111	3,482,000	855,000	2,627,000	27.11	6.66	20.45	
1985	130,514,405	3,523,000	877,000	2,646,000	26.99	6.72	20.27	
1986	132,536,250	3,578,000	900,000	2,678,000	27.00	6.79	20.21	
1987	134,509,334	3,620,000	919,000	2,701,000	26.91	6.83	20.08	
1988	136,438,714	3,641,000	930,000	2,711,000	26.69	6.82	19.87	
1989	138,330,173	3,457,291	843,256	2,614,035	24.99	6.10	18.90	
1990	140,190,598	3,507,335	859,522	2,647,813	25.02	6.13	18.89	
1991	146,917,459	3,452,487	876,397	2,576,090	23.49	5.97	17.53	
1992	148,661,804	3,370,548	888,480	2,482,068	22.66	5.98	16.70	
1993	150,468,717	3,281,193	913,618	2,367,575	21.80	6.07	15.73	
1994	152,357,254	3,157,241	920,348	2,236,893	20.73	6.04	14.68	
1995	154,255,819	3,062,431	936,068	2,126,363	19.86	6.07	13.79	
1996	156,009,399	3,019,769	950,328	2,069,441	19.36	6.09	13.26	
1997	157,784,093	3,035,898	980,515	2,055,383	19.24	6.21	13.03	
1998	159,553,507	3,035,197	1,011,218	2,023,979	19.02	6.34	12.69	
1999	161,296,715	3,020,616	1,024,073	1,996,543	18.73	6.35	12.38	
2000	169,590,693	3,206,761	946,686	2,260,075	18.8	5.6	13.2	
2001	176,208,646	3,115,474	961,492	2,153,982	17.7	5.5	12.2	
2002	178,499,255	3,059,402	982,807	2,076,595	17.1	5.5	11.6	
2003	180,708,344	3,426,727	1,005,882	2,420,845	19.0	5.6	13.4	
2004	182,865,043	3,329,120	1,025,981	2,303,139	18.2	5.6	12.6	
2005	184,991,143	3,329,431	1,010,052	2,319,379	18.0	5.5	12.5	
2006	187,061,610	3,172,000	1,037,504	2,134,496	17.0	5.5	11.5	
2007	189,038,268	3,080,266	1,050,408	2,029,858	16.3	5.6	10.7	
2008	191,010,274	3,107,927	1,074,889	2,033,038	16.3	5.6	10.7	
2009	192,980,905	3,045,696	1,098,384	1,947,312	15.8	5.7	10.1	1.906
2010	195,497,797	2,985,406	1,132,701	1,852,705	15.3	5.8	9.5	1.869
2011	197,397,018	3,044,594	1,163,740	1,880,854	15.4	5.9	9.5	1.833
2012	199,242,462	3,030,364	1,172,443	1,857,921	15.2	5.9	9.3	1.801
2013	201,032,714	2,989,981	1,195,913	1,794,068	14.9	5.9	8.9	1.770
2014	202,768,562	3,041,568	1,208,587	1,832,981	15.0	6.0	9.0	1.742
2015	204,450,649	3,058,783	1,244,558	1,814,225	15.0	6.1	8.9	1.716
2016	206,081,432	2,903,933	1,288,856	1,615,077	14.1	6.3	7.8	1.692
2017	207,660,929	2,962,815	1,292,297	1,670,518	14.3	6.2	8.0	1.63
2018	208,494,900	2,983,567	1,298,579	1,684,988	14.3	6.2	8.1	1.61
2019	210,147,125	2,888,218	1,332,466	1,555,752	13.7	6.3	7.4	1.59
2020	211,242,542	2,728,273	1,524,949	1,203,324	12.9	7.2	5.7	1.57
2021	213,317,639	2,708,884	1,802,487	906,397	12.7	8.5	4.2	1.53
2022	203,080,756	2,621,015	1,524,731	1,096,284	12.9	7.5	5.4	1.60
2023	204,153,622	2,598,289	1,450,421	1,147,868	12.7	7.1	5.6	1.57
2024	212,583,750	2,442,726	1,516,381	926,345	11.6	7.5	4.1	1.48
2025	213,421,037	2,452,875	1,528,085	924,790	11.5	7.2	4.3	1.52
2026	214,211,951							

=== Current vital statistics ===
The results presented are preliminary. The number of births are usually revised up by the Brazilian Institute of Statistics.

Period	Live births	Deaths	Natural increase
January—July 2025	1,465,888	907,454	+558,434
January—July 2026	1,410,599	860,629	+549,970
Difference	▼ –55,289 (–3.8%)	▼ –46,825 (–5.2%)	▼ –8,464

View source data.
View source data.
View source data.

=== Total fertility rate by regions and states ===
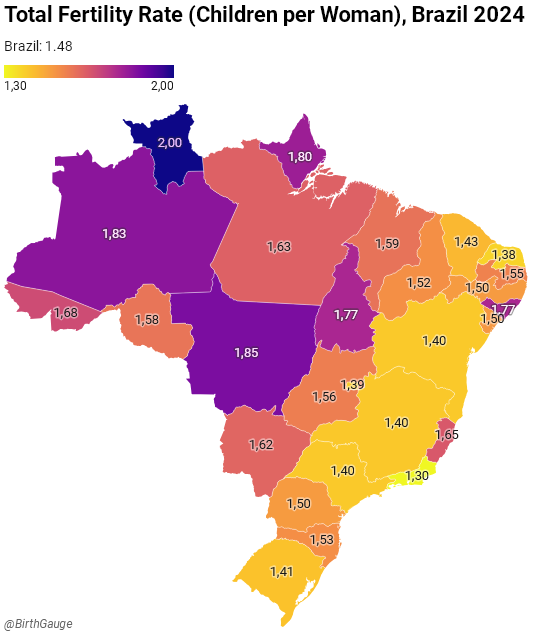
Total Fertility Rate of Brazil by state (2024)

2024
region	TFR
North Region	1.81
Central-West Region	1.67
Northeast Region	1.54
South Region	1.53
Southeast Region	1.45

2024
states	TFR
Roraima	2.00
Mato Grosso	1.85
Amazonas	1.83
Amapá	1.80
Alagoas	1.77
Tocantins	1.77
Acre	1.68
Espírito Santo	1.65
Pará	1.63
Mato Grosso do Sul	1.62
Maranhão	1.59
Rondônia	1.58
Goiás	1.56
Paraíba	1.55
Santa Catarina	1.53
Piauí	1.52
Paraná	1.50
Pernambuco	1.50
Sergipe	1.50
Ceará	1.43
Rio Grande do Sul	1.41
Bahia	1.40
Minas Gerais	1.40
São Paulo	1.40
Distrito Federal	1.39
Rio Grande do Norte	1.38
Rio de Janeiro	1.30

==== Regional and racial differences ====
In some states in the North and Northeast, the fertility rate was higher than the national average in 2021. The highest rate was in Acre, with 1.98 children per woman. Other regions with high fertility include Amapá, with 1.87 children per woman, Amazonas, 1.85 in Roraima, 1.84, in Maranhão, 1.82, and Pará, 1.79.

On the other hand, São Paulo is the state with the lowest rate, 1.26 children per woman. Other states with low fertility include Santa Catarina, with 1.28, Rio Grande do Sul, 1.3, in Rio de Janeiro, 1.32 in Paraná and Minas Gerais, 1.33.

Regarding race of mothers, between 2015 and 2021, the fertility rate of all racial groups fell below replacement rate. Black fertility fell from 2.01 to 1.76, Pardo/Mixed fertility fell from 1.95 to 1.73 and white fertility fell from 1.60 to 1.55. There was no information regarding Asian fertility rates. Indigenous fertility was calculated at 3.87 children per women in 2010.

According to the 2022 census, the total fertility by race was:

- 1.35 for white Brazilians
- 1.59 for black Brazilians
- 1.22 for yellow Brazilians
- 1.68 for mixed/pardos Brazilians
- 2.84 for indigenous Brazilians

=== Total fertility rate from 1940 to 1990 ===
The total fertility rate is the number of children born per woman. It is based on fairly good data for the entire period. Sources: Our World In Data and Gapminder Foundation.

Years	1940	1941	1942	1943	1944	1945	1946	1947	1948	1949	1950
Total fertility rate in Brazil	5.9	5.92	5.95	5.98	6.01	6.04	6.07	6.09	6.12	6.15	6.14

Years	1951	1952	1953	1954	1955	1956	1957	1958	1959	1960
Total fertility rate in Brazil	6.13	6.1	6.09	6.08	6.07	6.07	6.07	6.08	6.08	6.07

Years	1961	1962	1963	1964	1965	1966	1967	1968	1969	1970
Total fertility rate in Brazil	6.05	6	5.94	5.85	5.73	5.6	5.45	5.3	5.15	5.01

Years	1971	1972	1973	1974	1975	1976	1977	1978	1979	1980
Total fertility rate in Brazil	4.88	4.76	4.65	4.55	4.46	4.39	4.31	4.24	4.16	4.07

Years	1981	1982	1983	1984	1985	1986	1987	1988	1989	1990
Total fertility rate in Brazil	3.97	3.86	3.74	3.62	3.49	3.36	3.23	3.11	3.01	2.91

Years	1991	1992	1993	1994	1995	1996	1997	1998	1999	2000
Total fertility rate in Brazil	2.83	2.76	2.69	2.64	2.59	2.54	2.48	2.43	2.37	2.3

Years	2001	2002	2003	2004	2005	2006	2007	2008	2009	2010
Total fertility rate in Brazil	2.23	2.16	2.1	2.03	1.98	1.93	1.91	1.89	1.87	1.85

Years	2011	2012	2013	2014	2018
Total fertility rate in Brazil	1.84	1.80	1.78	1.77	1.71

Registration of vital events in Brazil has considerably improved during the past decades but is still not considered complete, especially in the northern part of the country. The Population Division of the United Nations prepared the following estimates and forecasts.

Period	Live births per year	Deaths per year	Natural change per year	CBR*	CDR*	NC*	TFR*	IMR*	Life expectancy		
Period	Live births per year	Deaths per year	Natural change per year	CBR*	CDR*	NC*	TFR*	IMR*	Total	Males	Females
1950–1955	2 578 000	908,000	1 670 000	44.2	15.6	28.6	6.15	135	50.9	49.2	52.6
1955–1960	2 923 000	956,000	1 967 000	43.3	14.1	29.1	6.15	122	53.3	51.5	55.2
1960–1965	3 315 000	988,000	2 327 000	42.3	12.6	29.7	6.15	109	55.7	53.8	57.6
1965–1970	3 345 000	975,000	2 370 000	37.2	10.8	26.4	5.38	100	57.6	55.7	59.6
1970–1975	3 462 000	973,000	2 489 000	33.9	9.5	24.4	4.72	91	59.5	57.3	61.8
1975–1980	3 788 000	1 035 000	2 753 000	32.9	9.0	23.9	4.31	79	61.5	59.2	63.9
1980–1985	4 006 000	1 078 000	2 928 000	28.9	8.3	22.6	3.30	63	63.4	60.4	66.8
1985–1990	3 790 000	1 079 000	2 711 000	24.4	7.5	18.9	2.95	52	65.3	61.9	69.1
1990–1995	3 547 000	1 074 000	2 473 000	22.0	6.9	15.8	2.40	43	67.3	63.6	71.2
1995–2000	3 658 000	1 052 000	2 606 000	20.6	6.2	15.4	2.21	34	70.3	66.5	74.3
2000–2005	3 370 000	1 102 000	2 268 000	17.8	5.9	13.9	2.05	27	71.9	68.2	75.8
2005–2010	3 066 000	1 149 000	1 917 000	15.4	5.9	10.5	1.81	24	73.2	69.7	76.9
2010–2015	2 975 000	1 227 000	1 748 000	13.0	5.9	9.1	1.76	19	74.8	71.2	78.5
2015–2020	2 934 000	1 338 000	1 596 000	11.8	6.3	7.5	1.63	16	76.5	73.0	80.1
2020–2025	2 763 000	1 477 000	1 286 000	10.7	6.7	6.0					
2025–2030	2 585 000	1 625 000	960 000	11.7	7.1	4.6					
2030–2035	2 445 000	1 781 000	664 000	10.9	7.7	3.2					
2035–2040	2 318 000	1 945 000	373 000	10.3	8.3	2.0					

CBR = crude birth rate (per 1000); CDR = crude death rate (per 1000); NC = natural change (per 1000); IMR = infant mortality rate per 1000 births; TFR = total fertility rate (number of children per woman)

=== Childlessness and education ===
The color or race of the woman and the level of education has also shown to influence the fact of not having children. In 2013, among white women aged 15 to 55 years, 41.5% had no children, while among black and brown women, the percentage was 35.8%.

The proportional difference is even greater among white women compared to black and brown 25–29 years. While the proportion among white women childless was 48.1% among black and brown women was 33.8%.

Regarding education, among women 15–49 years of age with more than eight years of schooling, 50% had no children in 2013, while among those with up to seven years of study this figure was 5%.

Schooling among women 25–29 years has shown an even greater disparity. Among the less educated, 16.3% had no children, while among the more educated 54.5% had no children. The proportion of women aged 45 to 49 without children was 8.2% in 2013 among those with less education and 15.1% among those with more years of schooling.

=== Census 1 August 2022 ===
	Total 100%	European 43.46%	African 10.17%	Asian 0.42%	Pardo (Multiracial) 45.34%	Native Indigenous 0.60%
Population 0–14	40 129 261	16 928 202	2 931 938	96 204	19 768 271	403 008
Percent group 0–14 by race	19.76%	19.18%	14.19%	11.32%	21.47%	32.83%
Population 0–14 compared to racial groups	100%	42.18%	7.31%	0.24%	49.26%	1.00%
Population 15–49	106 670 318	43 655 766	11 919 890	394 574	50 071 944	621 087
Ratio 0–14 to 15–49	0.3762	0.3878	0.2460	0.2438	0.3948	0.6489

Age group	Brazil 100% (percent of the population)	European 43.46%	African 10.17%	Asian 0.42%	Pardo (Multiracial) 45.34%	Native Indigenous 0.60%	
Age group	Brazil 100% (percent of the population)	(percent in the race/percent in the age group)					
Total	203 080 756	88 252 121	20 656 458	850 130	92 083 286	1 227 642	11 119
0–4	12 704 860 (6.26%)	5 784 444 (6.55%/45.53%)	801 774 (3.88%/6.31%)	27 148 (3.19%/0.21%)	5 951 556 (6.46%/46.84%)	139 379 (11.35%/1.10%)	559
5–9	13 749 440 (6.77%)	5 734 804 (6.50%/41.71%)	1 020 633 (4.94%/7.42%)	33 191 (3.90%/0.24%)	6 824 824 (7.41%/49.64%)	135 440 (11.03%/0.99%)	548
10–14	13 674 961 (6.73%)	5 408 954 (6.13%/39.55%)	1 109 531 (5.37%/8.11%)	35 865 (4.22%/0.26%)	6 991 891 (7.59%/51.13%)	128 189 (10.44%/0.94%)	531
15–19	14 375 942 (7.08%)	5 610 575 (6.36%/39.03%)	1 403 059 (6.79%/9.76%)	42 066 (4.95%/0.29%)	7 196 383 (7.82%/50.06%)	123 236 (10.04%/0.86%)	623
20–24	15 466 463 (7.62%)	6 076 604 (6.89%/39.29%)	1 725 800 (8.35%/11.16%)	49 540 (5.83%/0.32%)	7 500 613 (8.15%/48.50%)	112 621 (9.17%/0.73%)	1 285
25–29	15 469 723 (7.62%)	6 182 951 (7.01%/39.97%)	1 782 294 (8.63%/11.52%)	51 685 (6.08%/0.33%)	7 355 701 (7.99%/47.55%)	95 762 (7.8%/0.62%)	1 330
30–34	15 473 117 (7.62%)	6 375 027 (7.22%/41.20%)	1 747 944 (8.46%/11.30%)	56 875 (6.69%/0.37%)	7 208 525 (7.83%/46.59%)	83 594 (6.81%/0.54%)	1 152
35–39	16 172 791 (7.96%)	6 725 099 (7.62%/41.58%)	1 850 687 (8.96%/11.44%)	65 073 (7.65%/0.40%)	7 452 696 (8.09%/46.08%)	78 225 (6.37%/0.48%)	1 011
40–44	16 072 170 (7.91%)	6 827 463 (7.74%/42.48%)	1 851 159 (8.96%/11.52%)	69 575 (8.18%/0.43%)	7 253 228 (7.88%/45.13%)	69 796 (5.69%/0.43%)	949
45–49	13 640 112 (6.72%)	5 858 047 (6.64%/42.95%)	1 558 947 (7.55%/11.43%)	59 760 (7.03%/0.44%)	6 104 798 (6.63%/44.76%)	57 853 (4.71%/0.42%)	707
50–54	12 598 581 (6.20%)	5 628 210 (6.38%/44.67%)	1 403 801 (6.80%/11.14%)	56 819 (6.68%/0.45%)	5 460 379 (5.93%/43.34%)	48 764 (3.97%/0.39%)	608
55–59	11 569 106 (5.70%)	5 442 507 (6.17%/47.04%)	1 225 630 (5.93%/10.59%)	55 775 (6.56%/0.48%)	4 802 770 (5.22%/41.51%)	41 912 (3.41%/0.36%)	512
60–64	9 944 389 (4.90%)	4 851 865 (5.50%/48.79%)	1 038 306 (5.03%/10.44%)	53 220 (6.26%/0.54%)	3 965 766 (4.31%/39.88%)	34 801 (2.83%/0.35%)	431
65-69	7 876 232 (3.88%)	3 979 726 (4.51%/50.53%)	795 018 (3.85%/10.09%)	52 667 (6.20%/0.67%)	3 021 587 (3.28%/38.36%)	26 946 (2.19%/0.34%)	288
70-74	5 858 536 (2.88%)	3 072 479 (3.48%/52.44%)	571 071 (2.76%/9.75%)	50 568 (5.95%/0.86%)	2 144 482 (2.33%/36.60%)	19 686 (1.60%/0.34%)	250
75-79	3 847 379 (1.89%)	2 091 008 (2.37%/54.35%)	357 500 (1.73%/9.29%)	39 386 (4.63%/1.02%)	1 345 830 (1.46%/34.98%)	13 528 (1.10%/0.35%)	127
80-84	2 475 030 (1.22%)	1 380 516 (1.56%/55.78%)	225 159 (1.09%/9.10%)	27 271 (3.21%/1.10%)	832 790 (0.90%/33.65%)	9 171 (0.75%/0.37%)	123
85-89	1 329 203 (0.65%)	771 547 (0.87%/58.05%)	116 147 (0.56%/8.74%)	14 890 (1.75%/1.12%)	421 745 (0.46%/31.73%)	4 823 (0.39%/0.36%)	51
90-94	579 729 (0.29%)	341 266 (0.39%/58.87%)	50 582 (0.24%/8.73%)	6 520 (0.77%/1.12%)	179 016 (0.19%/30.88%)	2 319 (0.19%/0.40%)	26
95-99	165 178 (0.08%)	92 544 (0.10%/56.03%)	15 990 (0.08%/9.68%)	1 924 (0.23%/1.16%)	53 733 (0.06%/32.53%)	983 (0.08%/0.60%)	4
100+	37 814 (0.02%)	16 485 (0.02%/43.59%)	5 426 (0.03%/14.35%)	312 (0.04%/0.83%)	14 973 (0.02%/39.60%)	614 (0.05%/1.62%)	4
0-14	40 129 261 (19.76%)	16 928 202 (19.18%/42.18%)	2 931 938 (14.19%/7.31%)	96 204 (11.32%/0.24%)	19 768 271 (21.47%/49.26%)	403 008 (32.83%/1.00%)	1 638
15-64	140 782 394 (69.32%)	59 578 348 (67.51%/42.32%)	15 587 627 (75.46%/11.07%)	560 388 (65.92%/0.40%)	64 300 859 (69.83%/45.67%)	746 564 (60.81%/0.53%)	8 608
65+	22 169 101 (10.92%)	11 745 571 (13.31%/52.98%)	2 136 893 (10.34%/9.64%)	193 538 (22.77%/0.87%)	8 014 156 (8.70%/36.15%)	78 070 (6.36%/0.35%)	873

== Migration ==
=== Summary ===
The United Nations reported in the International Migration Stock that 64 countries had significant emigration or immigration with Brazil in 2020. The Migration Policy Institute defines significant migration if 1,000+ people are in the emigration or/and migration group. Venezuela, Haiti, Portugal, Bolivia, and Uruguay have the most positive net migration, while the United States, Japan, Spain, Italy, and France have the most negative net migration.

Country	Immigrants		Emigrants		Net migration	
Country	Rank	People	Rank	People	Rank	People
Venezuela	1	248,105	30	5,680	1	+242,425
Portugal	2	175,251	3	154,017	3	+21,234
Japan	3	62,296	2	204,814	63	-142,518
Paraguay	4	49,842	6	79,897	54	-30,055
Bolivia	5	49,289	15	28,612	4	+20,677
Italy	6	47,193	4	133,398	61	-86,205
Spain	7	39,028	5	133,244	62	-94,216
Argentina	8	36,910	10	49,267	49	-12,357
Haiti	9	32,796	86	0	2	+32,796
Uruguay	10	30,537	21	14,762	5	+15,775
China	11	24,632	9	57,602	55	-32,970
United States	12	22,410	1	517,519	64	-495,109
Germany	13	20,625	7	70,888	59	-50,263
Chile	14	19,596	18	18,976	28	+620
Peru	15	19,074	19	16,458	17	+2,616
Lebanon	16	15,664	86	0	6	+15,664
Cuba	17	14,798	86	0	7	+14,798
France	18	12,138	8	65,761	60	-53,623
South Korea	19	10,981	86	0	8	+10,981
Colombia	20	8,700	32	4,685	14	+4,015
Angola	21	8,184	86	0	9	+8,184
Syria	22	8,003	86	0	10	+8,003
United Kingdom	23	6,281	11	44,175	56	-37,894
Senegal	24	6,267	46	670	11	+5,597
Bangladesh	25	5,384	22	14,628	47	-9,244
Poland	26	4,421	51	340	13	+4,081
DR Congo	27	4,375	86	0	12	+4,375
Netherlands	28	4,219	17	22,974	51	-18,755
Egypt	29	3,957	67	130	15	+3,827
Switzerland	30	3,789	13	42,715	57	-38,926
Nigeria	31	3,505	86	0	16	+3,505
Mexico	32	3,400	27	6,964	39	-3,564
Austria	33	2,968	29	6,173	38	-3,205
Israel	34	2,554	25	8,673	44	-6,119
Ghana	35	2,459	83	13	18	+2,446
Guyana	36	2,407	42	1,260	26	+1,147
Ecuador	37	2,195	37	2,774	32	-579
Romania	38	2,164	44	690	21	+1,474
Belgium	39	2,151	20	16,345	50	-14,194
Pakistan	40	2,094	86	0	19	+2,094
Canada	41	2,014	14	31,568	53	-29,554
South Africa	42	2,014	35	3,535	35	-1,521
Greece	43	1,956	39	2,258	31	-302
Hungary	44	1,936	41	1,321	29	+615
Mozambique	45	1,809	86	0	20	+1,809
Russia	46	1,761	50	431	22	+1,330
Cabo Verde	47	1,516	52	301	24	+1,215
Jordan	48	1,338	70	105	23	+1,233
Dominican Republic	50	1,274	45	671	30	+603
Guinea-Bissau	51	1,199	86	0	25	+1,199
India	52	1,118	86	0	27	+1,118
French Guiana	54	896	16	25,729	52	-24,833
Sweden	55	804	24	9,533	46	-8,729
Norway	58	728	28	6,256	43	-5,528
Australia	57	747	12	43,321	58	-42,574
Panama	61	660	38	2,406	36	-1,746
Finland	62	655	40	1,889	34	-1,234
Denmark	65	626	33	4,605	41	-3,979
Czech Republic	68	566	43	1,150	33	-584
New Zealand	77	346	26	8,319	45	-7,973
Suriname	78	346	31	5,566	42	-5,220
Ireland	86	217	23	11,800	48	-11,583
North Korea	88	182	36	2,841	37	-2,659
Luxembourg	111	68	34	3,722	40	-3,654

=== Immigration ===
Immigration to Brazil, by national origin, periods from 1830 to 1933 Source: Brazilian Institute for Geography and Statistics (IBGE)
Origin	1830–1855	1856–1883	1884–1893	1894–1903	1904–1913	1914–1923	1924–1933	1934–2023
Portuguese	16,737	116,000	170,621	155,542	384,672	201,252	233,650	400,000
Italians	—	100,000	510,533	537,784	196,521	86,320	70,177	
Spaniards	—	—	113,116	102,142	224,672	94,779	52,400	
Germans	2,008	30,000	22,778	6,698	33,859	29,339	61,723	
Japanese	—	—	—	—	11,868	20,398	110,191	
Lebanese	—	—	96	7,124	45,803	20,400	20,400	
Others	—	—	66,524	42,820	109,222	51,493	164,586	

Immigration has been a very important demographic factor in the formation, structure and history of the population in Brazil, influencing culture, economy, education, racial issues, etc. Brazil has received the third largest number of immigrants in the Western Hemisphere.

Brazil's structure, legislation and settlement policies for arriving immigrants were much less organized than in Canada and the United States at the time. Nevertheless, an Immigrant Inn (Hospedaria dos Imigrantes) was built in 1886 in São Paulo, and quick admittance and recording routines for the throngs of immigrants arriving by ship at the seaports of Vitória, Rio de Janeiro, Santos, Paranaguá, Florianópolis and Porto Alegre were established. The São Paulo State alone processed more than 2.5 million immigrants in its almost 100 years of continuous operation. People of more than 70 different nationalities were recorded.

Following the trend of several other countries in the Americas, which encouraged immigration from many countries, Brazil quickly became a melting pot of races and nationalities, but being peculiar in the sense of having the highest degree of intermarriage in the world. Immigrants found a strong social and cultural tolerance toward inter-racial marriage, including large numbers of Mulattoes (European and African), Caboclos (Indian and European) and mixed European, African and Indian people, though it was not accompanied by an entire lack of racism. Correspondingly, the same mentality reflected in low psychological and social barriers regarding intermarriage between Europeans, Middle Easterners and Asians of several origins, as well as between people of different religions.

=== History of immigration ===
It is postulated that the Americas were settled by three migratory waves from Northern Asia. The Native Brazilians are thought to descend from the first wave of migrants, who arrived in the region as early as 9000 BC. The main Native Brazilian groups are the Tupi-Guarani, the Jê, the Arawaks and the Caraibas (Kalina or Caribs). The Tupi-Guarani nation, originally from the Paraná River basin and also one of the largest of the Native-Paraguayan nations, had spread all along the Brazilian coastline from South to North and came to be known by the Portuguese as "Os Índios da Língua Geral" ("The Indians of the General Language"); the Jê nation occupied most of the interior of the country from Maranhão to Santa Catarina. The Arawaks and the Caribs, the last ones to get in contact with the Portuguese, lived in the North and Northwest of Brazil.

The European immigration to Brazil started in the 16th century, with the vast majority of them coming from Portugal. In the first two centuries of colonization, 100,000 Portuguese arrived in Brazil (around 500 colonists per year). In the 18th century, 600,000 Portuguese arrived (6,000 per year). The first region to be settled by the Portuguese was Northeastern Brazil, followed by the Southeast region. The original Amerindian population of Brazil (between two and five million) largely died from disease or violence or was assimilated into the Portuguese population. The Mamelucos (or Caboclos, a mixed race between Europeans and Amerindians) have always been present in many parts of Brazil.

Another important ethnic group, Africans, first arrived as slaves. Many came from Guinea-Bissau, or from West African countries – by the end of the eighteenth century many had been taken from the Kingdom of Kongo and modern-day Angola, Congo, Mozambique, Benin and Nigeria. By the time of the end of the slave trade in 1850, around six million slaves had been brought to Brazil–50% of all slave traffic between Africa and the Americas. Nowadays, there are still small immigration waves coming from the African continent. The largest influx of European immigrants to Brazil occurred in the late 19th and early 20th centuries. According to the Memorial do Imigrante statistics data, Brazil attracted nearly 5 million immigrants between 1870 and 1953.

These immigrants were divided in two groups: a part of them was sent to Southern Brazil to work as small farmers. However, the biggest part of the immigrants was sent to Southeast Brazil to work in the coffee plantations. The immigrants sent to Southern Brazil were mainly Germans (starting in 1824, mainly from Rhineland-Palatinate, Pomerania, Hamburg, Westphalia, etc.) Italians (starting in 1875, mainly from the Veneto and Lombardia), Austrians, Poles, Ukrainians and Russians. In the South, the immigrants established rural communities that retain a cultural connection with their ancestral homelands. In Southeast Brazil, most of the immigrants were Italians (mainly from the Veneto, Campania, Calabria and Lombardia), Portuguese (mainly from Beira Alta, Minho and Alto Trás-os-Montes) and Spaniards (mainly from Galicia and Andalusia).

Notably, the first half of the 20th century saw a large inflow of Japanese (mainly from Honshū, Hokkaidō and Okinawa) and Levantine Christians from Lebanon (and few from Syria). These Christian Levantine immigrants were wrongly called "Turks" by many Brazilians because their original countries were still under Ottoman rule back in the period when their immigration to Brazil began. The number of actual Turks who immigrated to Brazil was in fact very small. Chinese, Taiwanese and Koreans influx became common after the 1950s.

=== IBGE's 1998 PME ===
On the other hand, in 1998, the IBGE, within its preparation for the 2000 census, experimentally introduced a question about "origem" (origin/ancestry) in its "Pesquisa Mensal de Emprego" (Monthly Employment Research), to test the viability of introducing that variable in the census (the IBGE ended by deciding against the inclusion of questions about it in the census). This research interviewed about 90,000 people in six metropolitan regions (São Paulo, Rio de Janeiro, Porto Alegre, Belo Horizonte, Salvador, and Recife). To this day, it remains the only actual published survey about the immigrant origin of Brazilians.

Here are its results:

Brazilian Population, by ancestry, 1998
Ancestry	%
(Brazil) Brazilian	86.09%
(Portugal) Portuguese	10.46%
(Italy) Italian	10.41%
Indigenous	6.64%
Black	5.09%
(Spain) Spanish	4.40%
(Germany) German	3.54%
African	2.06%
(Japan) Japanese	1.34%
(Lebanon) (Syria) Lebanese/Syrian	0.48%
Jewish	0.20%
Others	2.81%
Total‡	133.52%

‡This is higher than 100% because of multiple answers. Many Brazilians are unaware of their ancestry, especially those whose ancestors migrated to Brazil long ago; hence the high number who declared themselves only as Brazilians.

=== Emigration ===
In the second half of the 1980s, Brazilians from various socioeconomic backgrounds started to emigrate to other countries in search of better economic opportunities.

By the 1990s, nearly 1.9 million Brazilians were living outside the country, mainly in the United States, Paraguay and Japan, but also in Italy, Portugal, the United Kingdom, France, Canada, Australia, Switzerland, Germany, Belgium, Spain and Israel. Despite the surge in the phenomenon, there were no specific policies implemented by the government to encourage or discourage this emigration process. Thanks to the favourable outlook of the Brazilian economy and due to the crisis that hit countries such as Japan, Portugal or the United States, emigration of Brazilian citizens stagnated – with many returning to their home country – until 2011, when 1,898,762 Brazilians were living abroad.

The 2000 Brazilian census provides some information about the high number of migrants returning to Brazil. For instance, of those who reported residing in another country less than 10 years before the 2000 census, 66.9 percent were Brazilians. If only the returning migrants (former Brazilian immigrants) are considered, 26.8 percent of Brazilians came from Paraguay, 17 percent came from Japan, and 15.8 percent came from the United States.

As political unrest, increasing violence, inflation, soaring unemployment rates and an economic crisis hit Brazil, millions of citizens moved abroad starting in 2011, generating the largest emigration process ever witnessed in Brazilian history, since Brazil has historically been a land of immigrants. In 2021 more than 4.4 million Brazilians live abroad, this is an increase of around 132% compared to the previous 10 years.

The largest Brazilian community abroad, comprising almost half of the diaspora, is the one in the US, where around 2,000,000 Brazilians live; they are present especially in Florida. Almost 300,000 Brazilians, hence 6.8% of all Brazilians living abroad, lived in other Portuguese-speaking countries (94% in Portugal). In the same year around 680,000 Brazilians, hence 15.5% of the Brazilian diaspora, lived in Spanish-speaking countries, with the majority found in neighbouring countries such as Paraguay and Uruguay.

Other major communities are found in countries such as the UK (220,000 Brazilians in 2021), Canada (122,500 Brazilians in 2021) Ireland (70,000 Brazilians in 2021) and Australia (60,000 Brazilians in 2021).

There are also noticeable Brazilian communities in countries once source of immigrants such as Japan (210,000 Brazilians in 2021), Italy (162,000 Brazilians in 2021), Germany (140,000 Brazilians in 2021), the Netherlands (65,000 Brazilians in 2021) and Lebanon (21,000 Brazilians in 2021). Many of the Brazilians found in these countries are descendants of the early immigrants who came to Brazil in the early 1900s.

There is also a sizeable Brazilian community in France (172,000 Brazilians in 2021), almost equally split between Metropolitan France and French Guiana.

== Racial composition ==
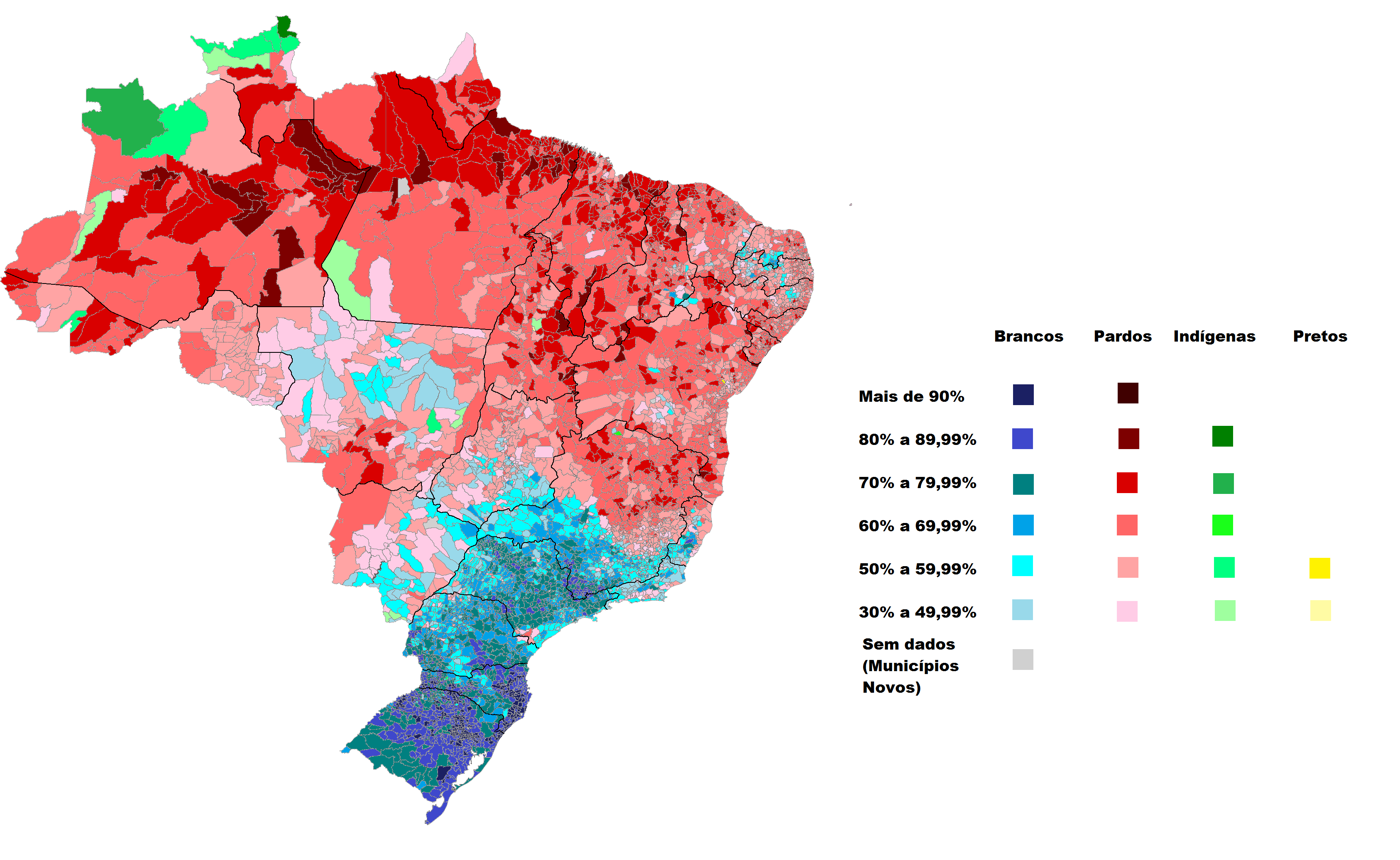
A map of predominant racial groups by municipality. White majority Pardo (Mixed-race) majority Indigenous majority Black majority

Races in Brazil (2022)
1. Brown (45.3%)
2. White (43.5%)
3. Black (10.2%)
4. Indigenous (0.80%)
5. Yellow (East-Asian descent) (0.42%)

Brazilians are one of the most diverse populations in the world, as a result of the crosses between peoples from three continents: the European colonizers, represented mainly by the Portuguese; Africans; and the autochthonous Amerindians. By 1500, around 2.5 million indigenous people were living in the area of what is now Brazil. It is estimated that about 500,000 Portuguese arrived in Brazil, between 1500 and 1808. The Portuguese-Amerindian admixture started soon after the arrival of the first Portuguese, in 1500. The native groups underwent a demographic decline due to conflicts with colonizers and diseases. Portugal remained as the only significant source of European immigrants to Brazil until 1808, when Brazilian ports were legally opened to all friendly nations. From then, Brazil received increasing numbers of immigrants, mostly from Portugal, followed by Italy, Spain, and Germany. In the 20th century, Asian immigrants also starting arriving, mainly from Japan, but also from Lebanon and Syria.

The Brazilian Institute of Geography and Statistics (IBGE), which has conducted censuses in Brazil since 1940, racially classifies the Brazilian population in five categories: Branco (White), "Pardo" (brown), Preto (Black), Amarelo (Yellow - for people of East-Asian descent, such as Japanese, Chinese, Korean), and Indígena (Indigenous). Brazilians tend to classify themselves racially based on physical appearance, such as skin pigmentation, hair type, nose shape, and lip shape. There appears to be no racial descent rule operational in Brazil and it is even possible for two full siblings differing in color to belong to completely diverse racial categories. A 2016 survey found out that approximately 17–19% of Brazilian families have full siblings who are identified as different races. More than 80% of families with different-race siblings had one sibling identified as White and another identified as Pardo (brown). About 40% of families with one White and one non-White parent have different-race siblings.

Mixed-race marriages increased from 8.2% of all marriages in 1960 to 30.7% in 2010. Demographers attribute this trend to changes in the country's ethnic composition. Between 2000 and 2022, the proportion of the population identifying as white declined from 53.7% to 43.5%, while the proportion identifying as pardo (brown) increased from 38.5% to 45.3%, making pardos the country's largest self-identified ethnic group.

Distribution of racial groups in Brazil

Pardo Brazilians

White Brazilians

Black Brazilians

Native Brazilians
Population pyramids by race, 2022 census.

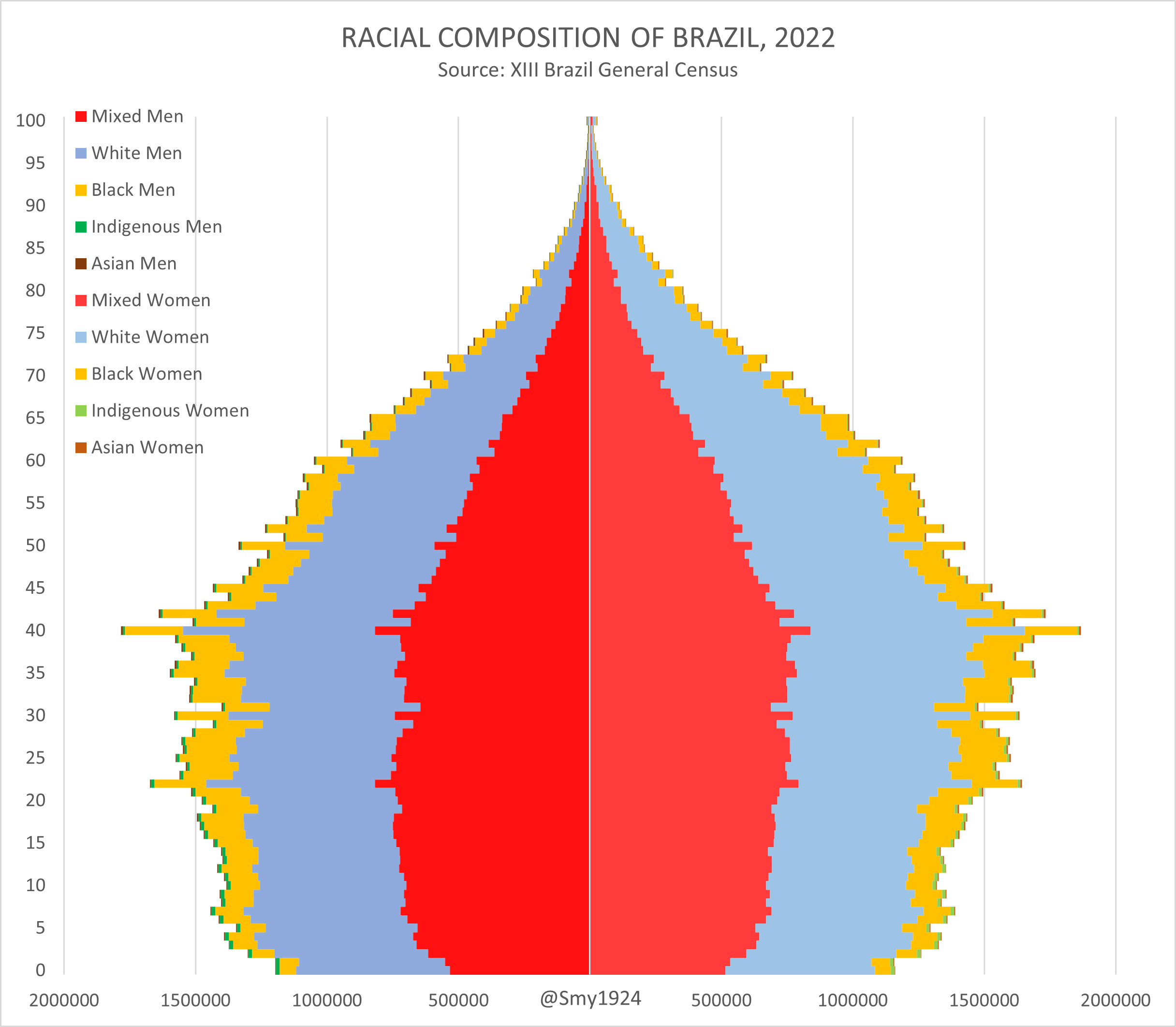
Population pyramid by race

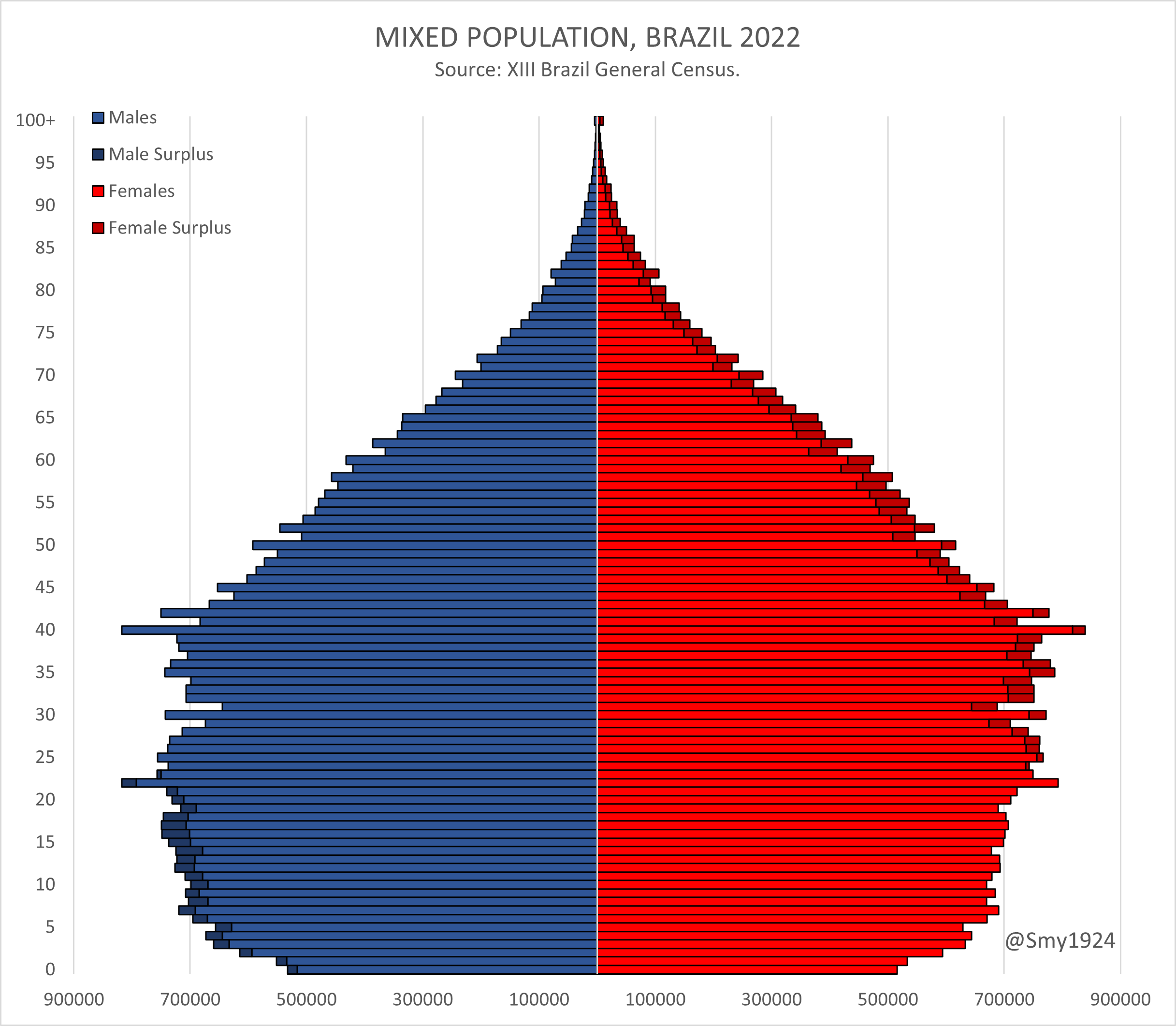
Mixed

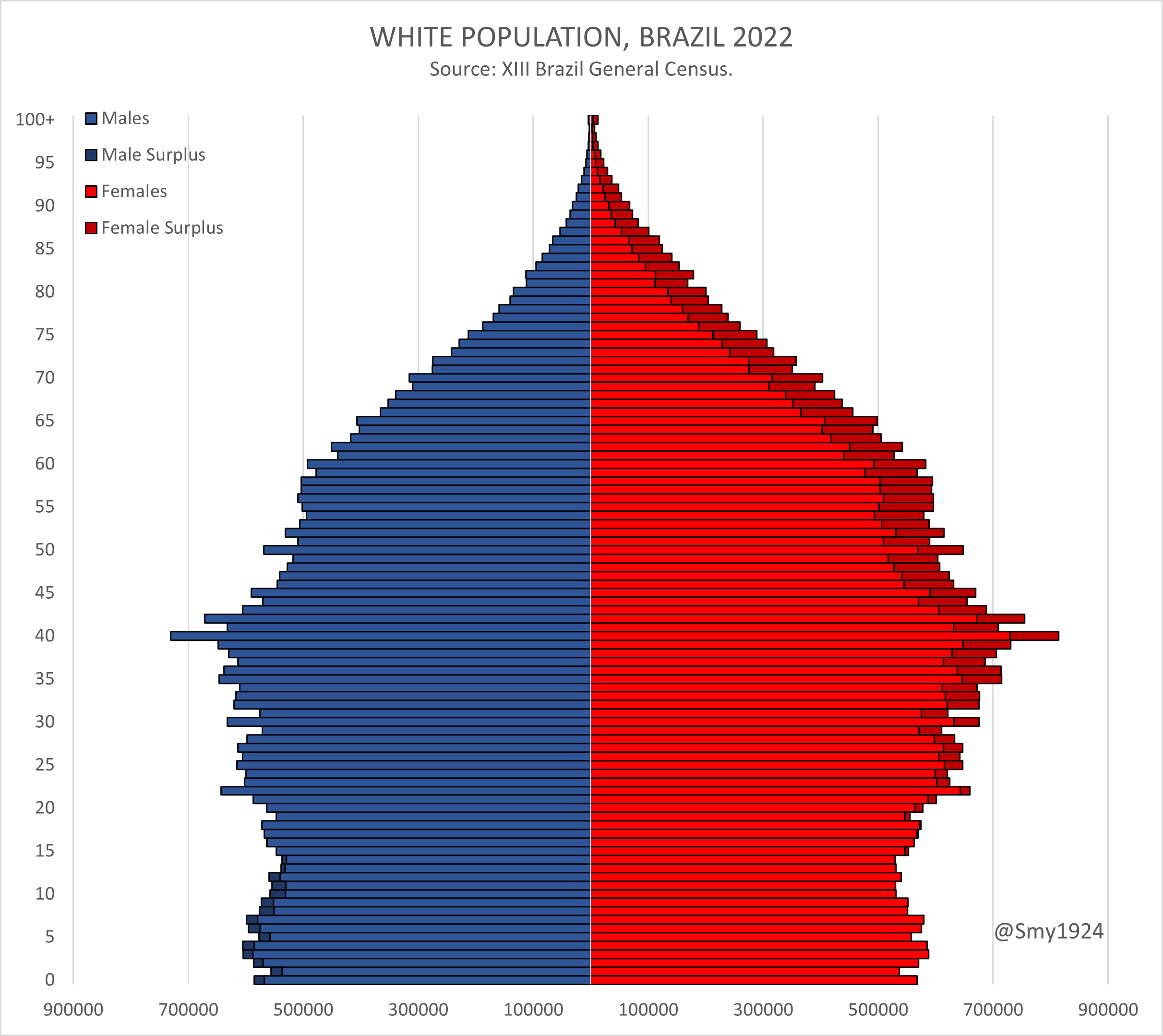
White

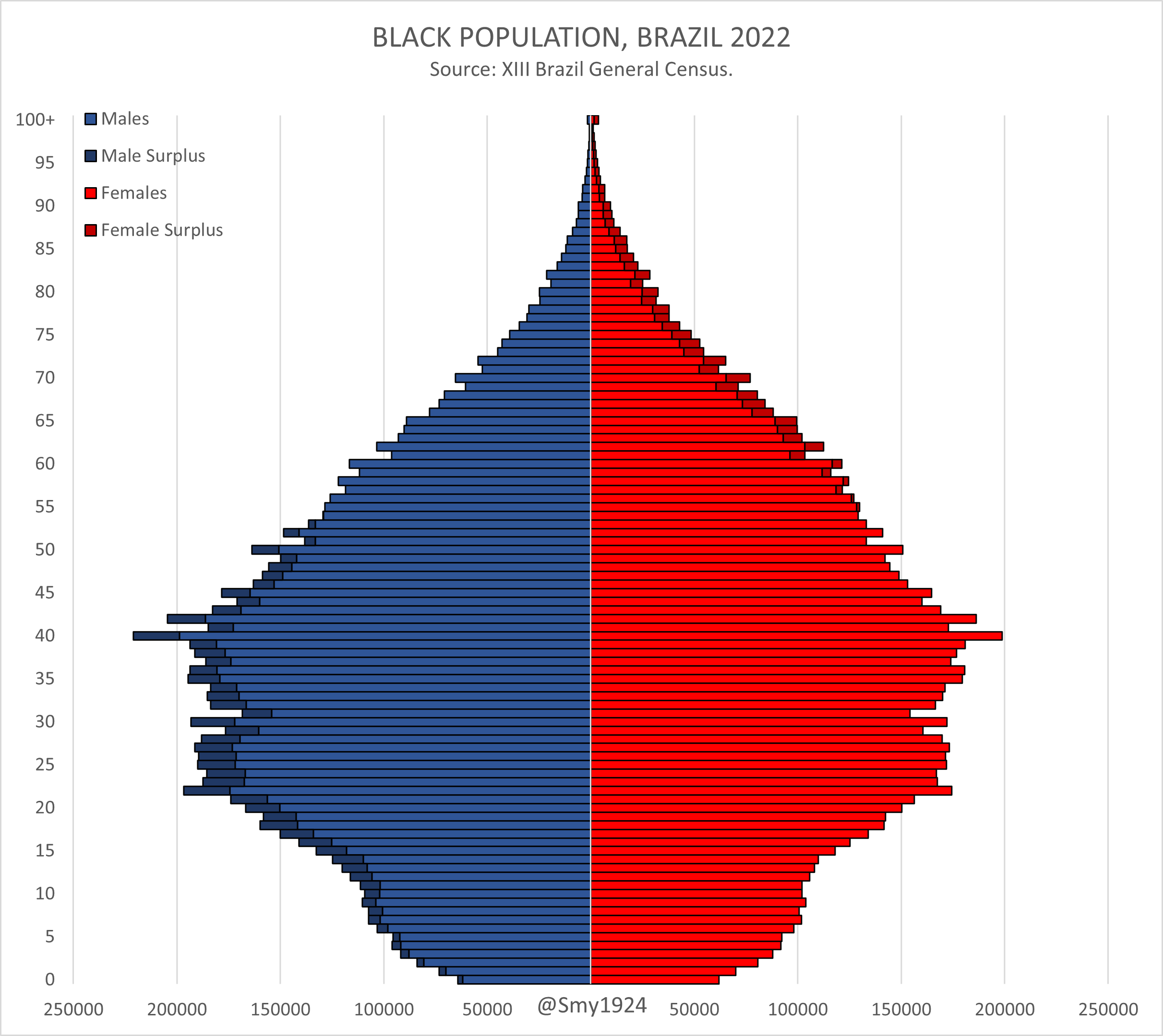
Black

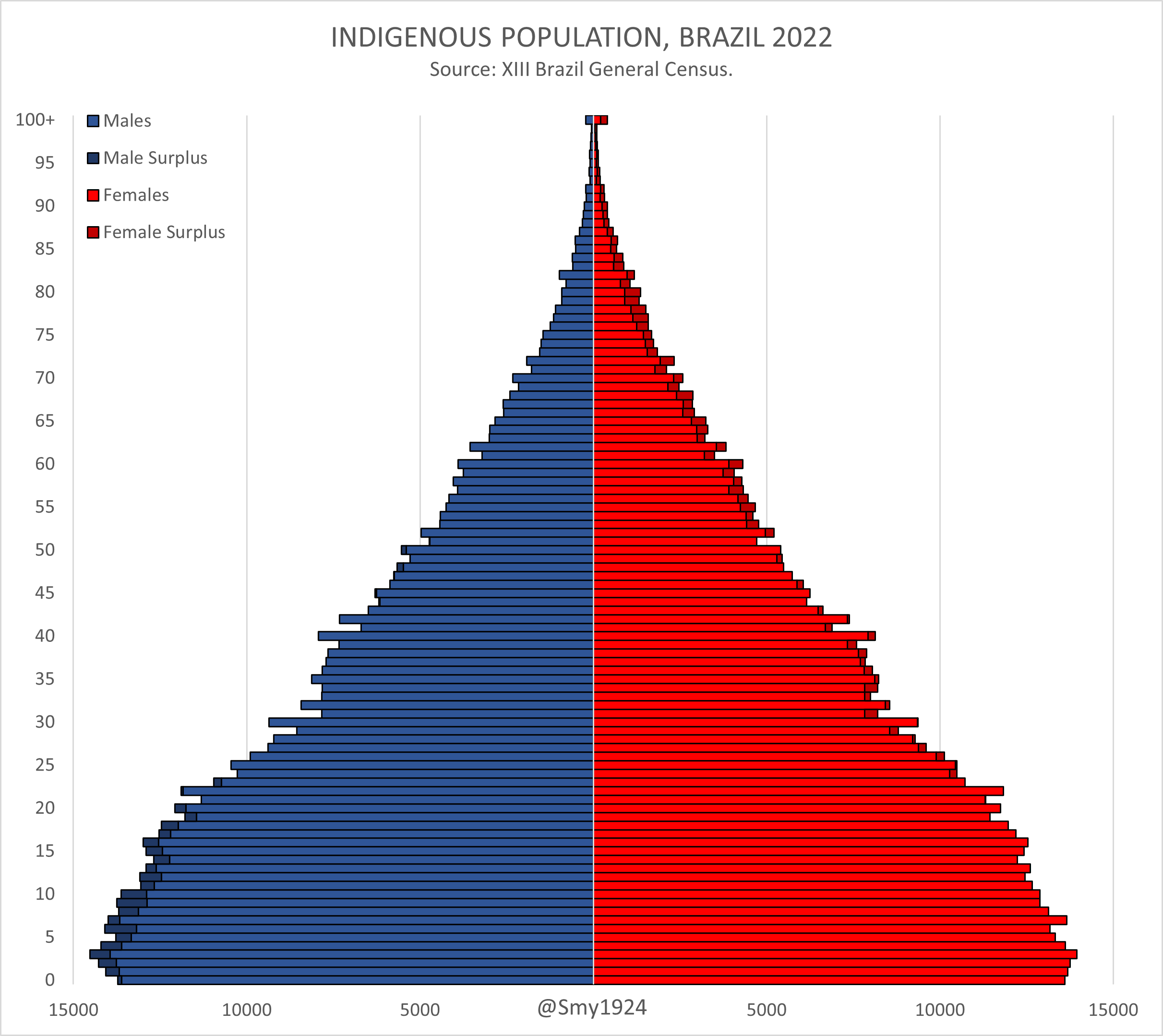
Indigenous

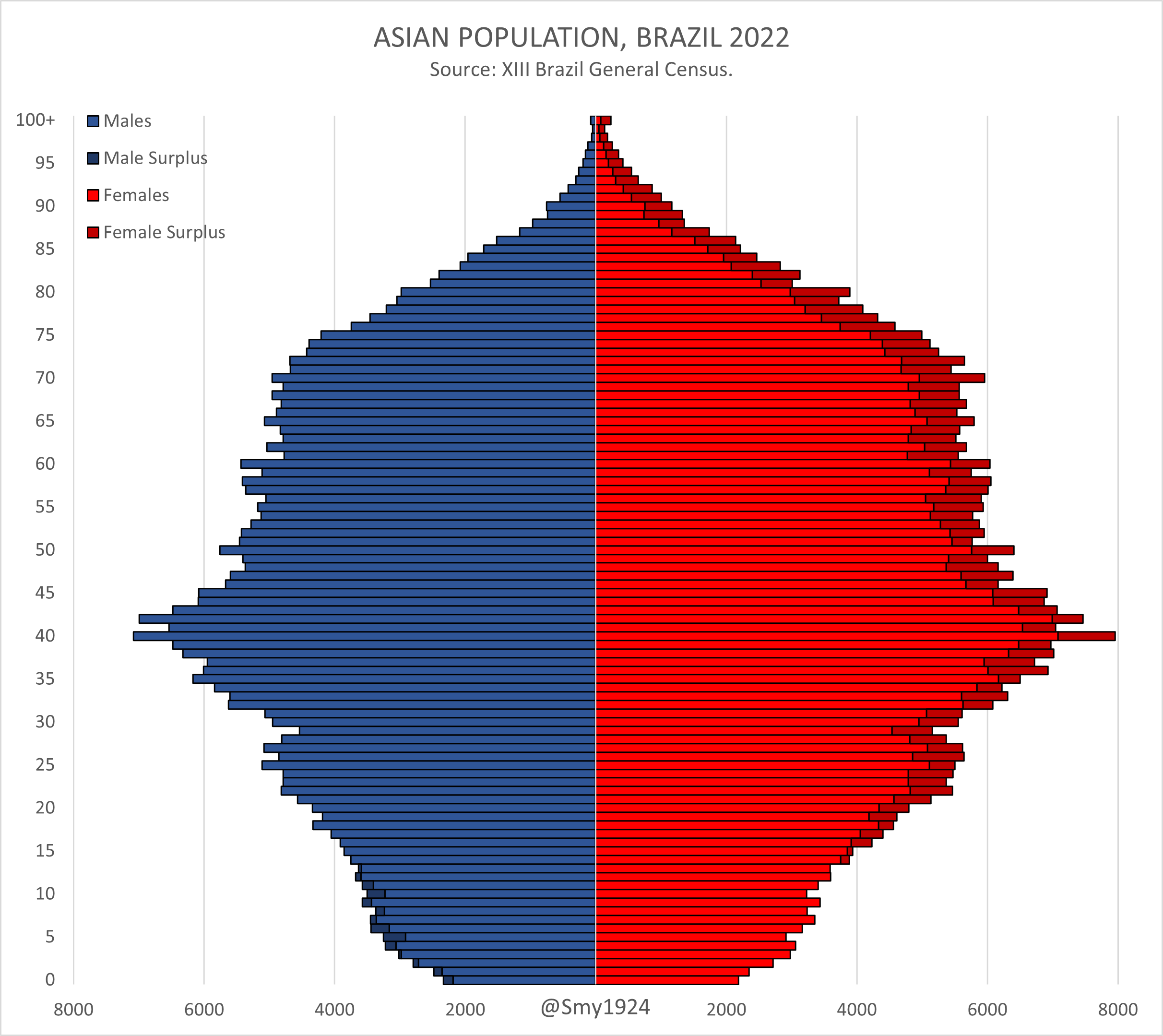
Asian

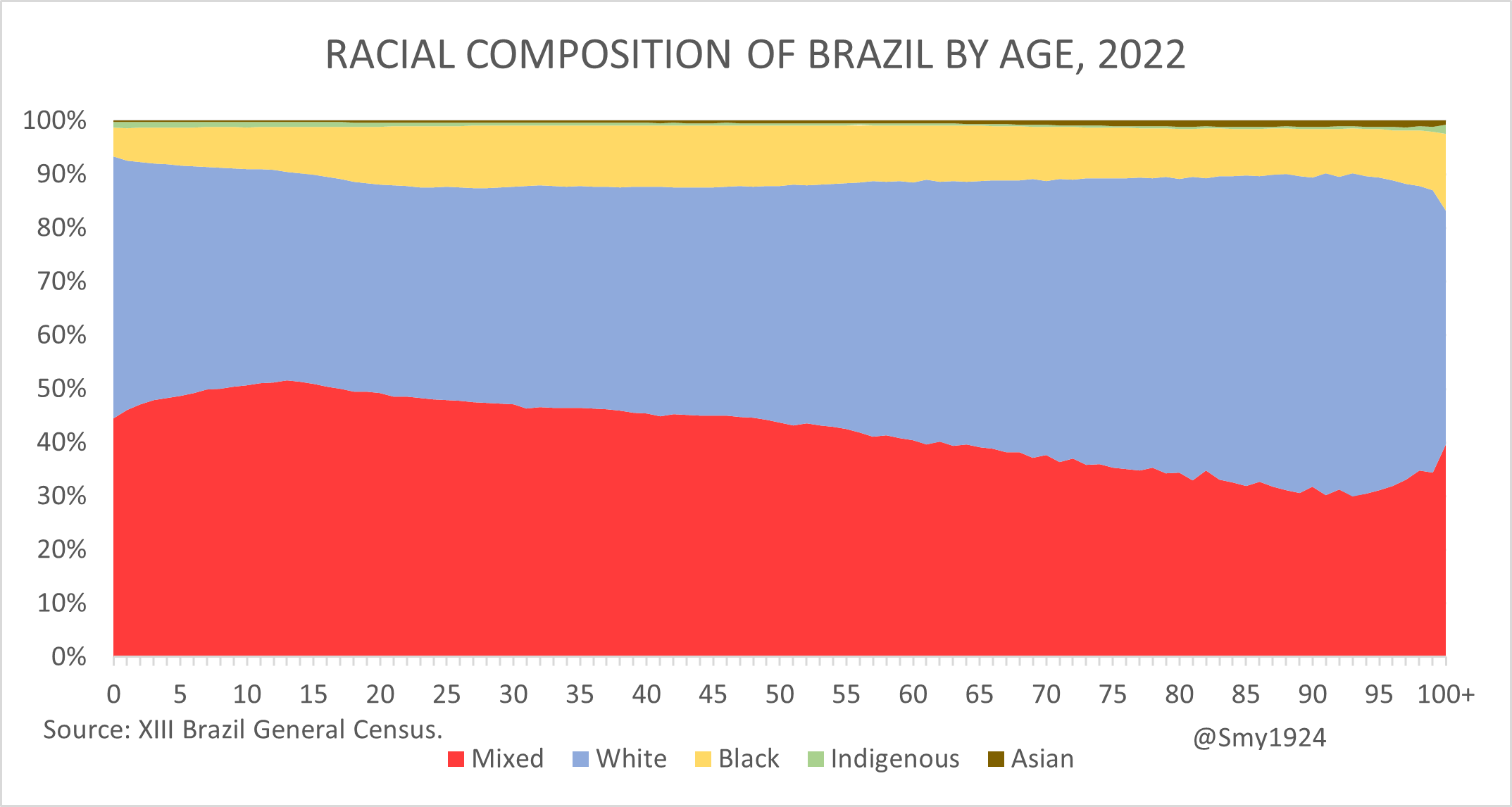
Racial composition by age, 2022.

=== White Brazilians ===
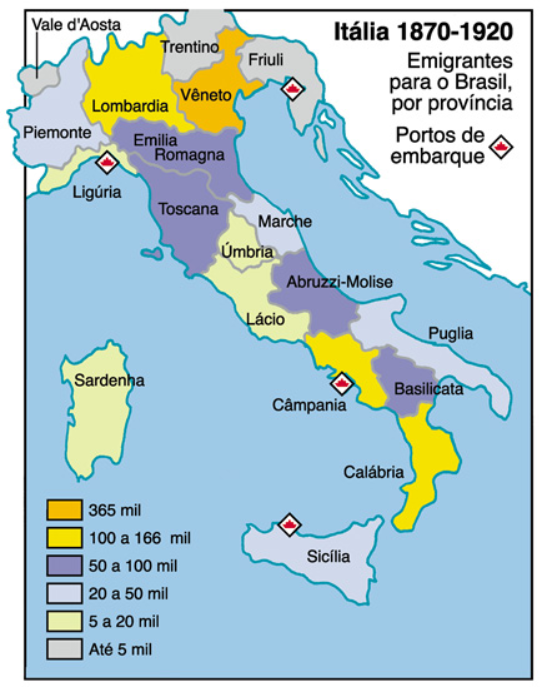
Italian regional immigration to Brazil, which has the most people of Italian origin outside Italy. Unlike other countries with Italian immigrants, Brazil prioritized Northern Italy which it considered more developed

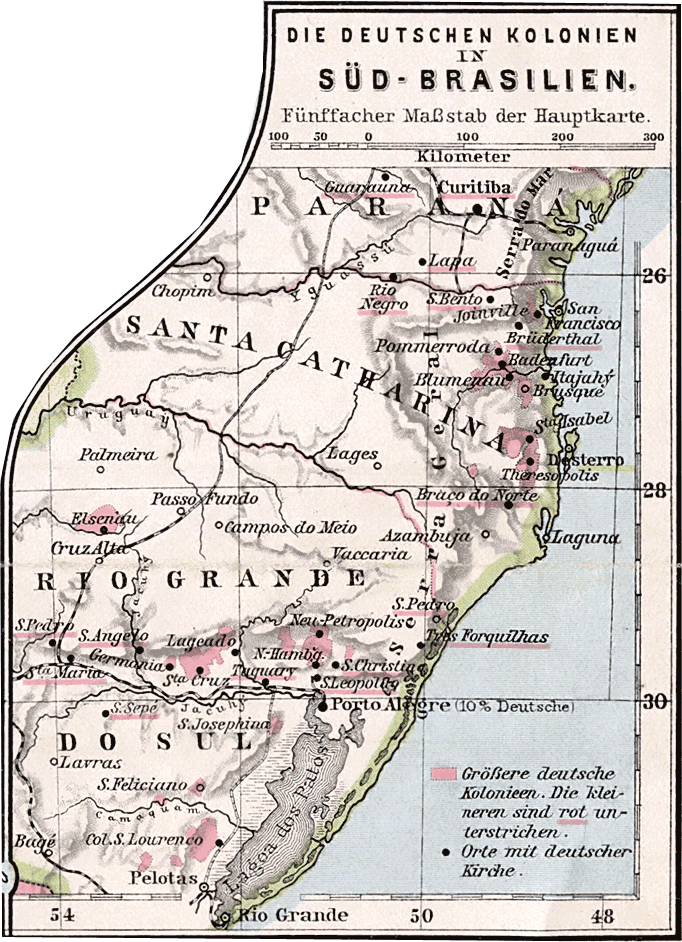
German settlements in Southern Brazil

According to the 2022 census, there were 88,2 million white Brazilians, comprising 43.5% of Brazil's population. Descendants of Europeans are found in the entire territory of Brazil, although they are most concentrated in the south and southeastern parts of the country. A survey conducted in 1998 by the Minas Gerais sociologist Simon Schwartzman interviewed about 34 million Brazilians, of whom nearly 20 million declared themselves white. Asked the ethnic origin of the participants of white race, a plurality pointed only Brazilian origin (53%). More than half, however, managed to point to a foreign origin: 17.2% indicated Portuguese ancestry, 16.50% Italian, 9.42% Spanish, 6.51% German and 12.32% other origins, which include Polish, Ukrainian, Russian, Lithuanian, Dutch, Austrian, Swiss, French, Hungarian, Norwegian, partial distant African, indigenous, British, American Confederate, Jewish (mostly Ashkenazi, but also Sephardi including Jews from Morocco and Egypt) and Arab. Many Whites in Brazil have some Amerindian and/or African ancestry (similarly found in European-Americans and European-Argentines).

Nowadays, European-Brazilians come from a very diverse background, which includes:

- Portuguese: Most Brazilians are fully or partly of Portuguese ancestry. Portuguese settlers began arriving in 1500. Immigration increased during the 18th century and reached its peak in the late 19th and early 20th centuries.
- Italians started arriving in Brazil in 1875, making up the main group of immigrants in the late 19th century. First they settled in rural communities across Southern Brazil. In the early 20th century, they mostly settled in the coffee plantations in the Southeast, later moving to São Paulo capital to work in factories or starting their own businesses in trade, services and industry like businessman and industrialist count Francesco Matarazzo. In São Paulo, which came to be labeled an "Italian city" in the early twentieth century, Italians engaged mainly in the incipient industry and urban services activities. They came to represent 60% of the 60,000 workers employed in São Paulo factories in 1901. Talian, or the Venetian dialect, is the third most spoken mother tongue in the nation.
- The first Germans arrived in Brazil in 1824. Most of them established themselves in rural communities across Southern Brazil, such as São Leopoldo, Novo Hamburgo, Blumenau and Pomerode. According to Ethnologue, Standard German is spoken by 1.5 million people and Brazilian German encompass assorted dialects, including Riograndenser Hunsrückisch spoken by over 3 million Brazilians.
- Poles came in significant numbers to Brazil after 1870. Most of them settled in the State of Paraná, working as small farmers.
- Spaniards came in large numbers to Brazil, starting in the late 19th century. Most of them were attracted to work in the coffee plantations in the state of São Paulo.
- Ukrainians came mostly in the late 19th century. Currently they number approximately 980,000, most of whom live in a compact settlement in south central Paraná.

=== Mixed-race/Pardo-Brazilians ===
Brazil does not have a category for multiracial people, but a Pardo (brown) one, which may include caboclos, mulatos, cafuzos (local ethnonyms for people of noticeable mixed European and Amerindian, African and European, and Amerindian and African descent, i.e., mestizos, mulattoes and zambos, respectively), the multiracial result of their intermixing (despite most of White and Black Brazilians possessing some degree of race-mixing, since brownness in Brazil is a matter of phenotype) and assimilated, westernized indigenous people.

The Pardos make up 45.3% or 92.1 million people of Brazil's population. They live in the entire territory of Brazil. Although, according to DNA resources, most Brazilians possess some degree of mixed-race ancestry, less than 45% of the country's population classified themselves as being part of this group due to phenotype.

=== Afro-Brazilians ===
According to the 2022 census, there are 20.7 million self-declared Black Brazilians, about 10.2% of the population.

=== Asian/Yellow Brazilians ===
According to the 2022 census, self-declared Yellow Brazilians number 850,130, or 0.42% of Brazil's population. Yellow is the term used for people of East Asian (Japanese, Korean, Chinese) descent. In 2022, Japan's Ministry of Foreign Affairs stated that there were 2 million Japanese descendants in Brazil. Brazil has the largest population of Japanese descent outside Japan. Japanese immigration to Brazil started on 18 June 1908, when the Japanese ship Kasato-Maru arrived in the Port of Santos, south of São Paulo, carrying the first 781 people to take advantage of a bilateral agreement promoting immigration.

There are also smaller communities of Korean people and Chinese origin.

=== Native Brazilians ===
The Amerindians make up 0.8% of Brazil's population, or about 1.6 million people. Over half of them (867,000 or 51,2%) live in the regions of the Amazon rainforest ("Amazônia Legal"). Millions of Brazilians possess at least one Native South American ancestor, according to a mitochondrial DNA study, but only 0.8% self-identify as indigenous, due to race-mixing.

=== Genetic studies ===
Genetic studies have shown the Brazilian population as a whole to have European, African and Native American components. A 2015 autosomal DNA genetic study, which also analysed data of 25 studies of 38 different Brazilian populations concluded that: European ancestry accounts for 62% of the heritage of the population, followed by the African (21%) and the Native American (17%). The European contribution is highest in Southern Brazil (77%), the African highest in Northeast Brazil (27%) and the Native American is the highest in Northern Brazil (32%).

Region	European	African	Native American
North Region	51%	16%	32%
Northeast Region	69%	16%	15%
Central-West Region	72%	15%	12%
Southeast Region	75%	15%	10%
South Region	90%	5%	5%

An autosomal DNA study (2011), with nearly 1000 samples from every major race group ("whites", "pardos" and "blacks", according to their respective proportions) all over the country found out a major European contribution, followed by a high African contribution and an important Native American component.

"In all regions studied, the European ancestry was predominant, with proportions ranging from 60.6% in the Northeast to 77.7% in the South". The 2011 autosomal study samples came from blood donors (the lowest classes constitute the great majority of blood donors in Brazil), and also public health institutions personnel and health students.

Region	European	African	Native American
Northern Brazil	68.80%	10.50%	18.50%
Northeast Brazil	71.10%	16.30%	12.40%
Southeast Brazil	74.20%	17.30%	7.30%
Southern Brazil	79.50%	10.30%	9.40%

An autosomal study from 2013, with nearly 1300 samples from all of the Brazilian regions, found a predominant degree of European ancestry combined with African and Native American contributions, in varying degrees. 'Following an increasing North to South gradient, European ancestry was the most prevalent in all urban populations (with values up to 74%). The populations in the North consisted of a significant proportion of Native American ancestry that was about two times higher than the African contribution. Conversely, in the Northeast, Center-West and Southeast, African ancestry was the second most prevalent. At an intrapopulation level, all urban populations were highly admixed, and most of the variation in ancestry proportions was observed between individuals within each population rather than among population'.

Region'	European	African	Native American
North Region	51%	17%	32%
Northeast Region	73%	16%	11%
Central-West Region	75%	15%	10%
Southeast Region	73%	17%	10%
South Region	92%	3%	5%

An autosomal DNA study from 2009 found a similar profile: "all the Brazilian samples (regions) lie more closely to the European group than to the African populations or to the Mestizos from Mexico".

Region	European	African	Native American
North Region	60.6%	21.3%	18.1%
Northeast Region	77.3%	16.1%	6.6%
Central-West Region	70.3%	19.7%	10.0%
Southeast Region	67.7%	25.0%	7.3%
South Region	91.5%	4.3%	4.2%

A 2015 autosomal genetic study, which also analysed data of 25 studies of 38 different Brazilian populations concluded that: European ancestry accounts for 62% of the heritage of the population, followed by the African (21%) and the Native American (17%). The European contribution is highest in Southern Brazil (77%), the African highest in Northeast Brazil (27%) and the Native American is the highest in Northern Brazil (32%).

Region	European	African	Native American
North Region	51%	16%	32%
Northeast Region	77%	16%	7%
Central-West Region	78%	14%	8%
Southeast Region	72%	19%	9%
South Region	91%	5%	4%

Pairwise estimates of F(st) among the five Brazilian geopolitical regions suggested little genetic differentiation only between the South and the remaining regions. Estimates of ancestry results are consistent with the heterogeneous genetic profile of Brazilian population, with a major contribution of European ancestry (0.771) followed by African (0.143) and Amerindian contributions (0.085). The described multiplexed SNP panels can be useful tool for bioanthropological studies but it can be mainly valuable to control for spurious results in genetic association studies in admixed populations".

According to another autosomal DNA study from 2008, by the University of Brasília (UnB), European ancestry dominates in the whole of Brazil (in all regions), accounting for 65.90% of heritage of the population, followed by the African contribution (24.80%) and the Native American (9.3%).

São Paulo state, the most populous state in Brazil, with about 40 million people, showed the following composition, according to an autosomal study from 2006: European genes account for 79% of the heritage of the people of São Paulo, 14% are of African origin, and 7% Native American. A study from 2013 found the following composition in São Paulo state: 70% European, 20% African, 6% Asian and 4% Native American. Another study focused on highly admixed populations yielded similar results.

=== Races and ethnicities by region ===
==== South ====
Races in the South Region (2022 census)
1. White (72.6%)
2. Mixed (21.7%)
3. Black (5.00%)
4. East Asian (0.40%)
5. Indigenous (0.30%)

According to the 2022 census, in the South Whites make up 72.6% of the population, Pardo (brown) 21.7%, Blacks 5%, 0.4% Yellow (Asian descent) and 0.3% Indigenous

The South of Brazil is the region with the largest percentage of Whites. According to the 2005 census, people of Whites account for 87% of the population. In colonial times, this region had a very small population.

The region what is now Southern Brazil was originally settled by Amerindian peoples, mostly Guarani and Kaingangs. Only a few settlers from São Paulo were living there. This situation made the region vulnerable to attacks from neighboring countries. This fact forced the King of Portugal to decide to populate the region. For this, settlers from the Portuguese Azores islands were sent to the coast in 1617.

To stimulate the immigration to Brazil, the king offered several benefits for the Azorean couples. Between 1748 and 1756, six thousand Portuguese from the Azores moved to the coast of Santa Catarina. They were mainly newly married who were seeking a better life. At that time, the Azores were one of the poorest regions of Portugal.

They established themselves mainly in the Santa Catarina Island, nowadays the region of Florianópolis. Later, some couples moved to Rio Grande do Sul, where they established Porto Alegre, the capital. The Azoreans lived on fishing and agriculture, especially flour. They composed over half of Rio Grande do Sul and Santa Catarina's population in the late 18th century. The state of Paraná was settled by colonists from São Paulo due to their proximity (Paraná was part of São Paulo until the mid-19th century).

With the development of cattle in the interior of Rio Grande do Sul, African slaves began arriving in large numbers. By 1822, Africans were 50% of Rio Grande do Sul's population. This number decreased to 25% in 1858 and to only 2.2% in 2015. Most of them came from Angola.

After independence from Portugal (1822) the Brazilian government started to stimulate the arrival of a new wave of immigrants to settle the South. In 1824 they established São Leopoldo, a German community. Major Schaeffer, a German who was living in Brazil, was sent to Germany in order to bring immigrants. From Rhineland-Palatinate, the Major brought the immigrants and soldiers. Settlers from Germany were brought to work as small farmers, because there were many land holdings without workers.

To attract the immigrants, the Brazilian government had promised large tracts of land, where they could settle with their families and colonize the region. The first years were not easy. Many Germans died of tropical disease, while others left the colonies to find better living conditions. The German colony of São Leopoldo was a disaster. Nevertheless, in the following years, a further 4,830 Germans arrived at São Leopoldo, and then the colony started to develop, with the immigrants establishing the town of Novo Hamburgo (New Hamburg).

From São Leopoldo and Novo Hamburgo, the German immigrants spread into others areas of Rio Grande do Sul, mainly close to sources of rivers. The whole region of Vale dos Sinos was populated by Germans. During the 1830s and part of the 1840s German immigration to Brazil was interrupted due to conflicts in the country (Ragamuffin War). The immigration restarted after 1845 with the creation of new colonies. The most important ones were Blumenau, in 1850, and Joinville in 1851, both in Santa Catarina state; these attracted thousands of German immigrants to the region. In the next five decades, other 28 thousand Germans were brought to Rio Grande do Sul to work as small farmers in the countryside. By 1914, it is estimated that 50 thousand Germans settled in this state.

Another immigration boom to this region started in 1875. Communities with Italian immigrants were also created in southern Brazil. The first colonies to be populated by Italians were created in the highlands of Rio Grande do Sul (Serra Gaúcha). These were Garibaldi and Bento Gonçalves. These immigrants were predominantly from Veneto, in northern Italy. After five years, in 1880, the great numbers of Italian immigrants arriving caused the Brazilian government to create another Italian colony, Caxias do Sul. After initially settling in the government-promoted colonies, many of the Italian immigrants spread themselves into other areas of Rio Grande do Sul seeking further opportunities.

They created many other Italian colonies on their own, mainly in highlands, because the lowlands were already populated by Germans and native gaúchos. The Italian established many vineyards in the region. Nowadays, the wine produced in these areas of Italian colonization in southern Brazil is much appreciated within the country, though little is available for export. In 1875, the first Italian colonies were established in Santa Catarina, which lies immediately to the north of Rio Grande do Sul. The colonies gave rise to towns such as Criciúma, and later also spread further north, to Paraná.

A significant number of Poles have settled in Southern Brazil. The first immigrants arrived in 1869 and until 1959, it is estimated that over 100,000 Poles migrated to Brazil, 95% of whom were peasants. The State of Paraná received the majority of Polish immigrants, who settled mainly in the region of Curitiba, in the towns of Mallet, Cruz Machado, São Matheus do Sul, Irati, and União da Vitória.

==== Southeast ====
Races in the Southeast Region (2022 census)
1. White (49.9%)
2. Mixed (38.7%)
3. Black (10.6%)
4. East Asian (0.70%)
5. Indigenous (0.10%)

According to the 2022 census, in the Southeast Whites make up 49.9% of the population, Pardo (brown) 38.7%, Blacks 10.6%, Yellow (Asian descent) 0.7% and Indigenous 0.1%. The Southeastern region of Brazil is the most ethnically diverse and most populated part of the country.

Southeast Brazil is home to the oldest Portuguese village in the Americas, São Vicente, São Paulo, established in 1532. The region, since the beginning of its colonization, is a melting pot of Africans, Natives, and Europeans. The Indigenous peoples of the region were enslaved by the Portuguese.

The race mixing between the indigenous females and their European masters produced the Bandeirante, the colonial inhabitant of São Paulo, who formed expeditions that crossed the interior of Brazil and greatly increased the Portuguese colonial territory. The main language spoken by these people of mixed Indian/Portuguese heritage was Língua geral, a language that mixed Tupi and Portuguese words.

In the late 17th century the Bandeirantes found gold in the area that nowadays is Minas Gerais. A gold rush took place in Brazil and thousands of Portuguese colonists arrived during this period. The confrontation between the Bandeirantes and the Portuguese for obtaining possession of the mines led to the Emboabas' War.

The Portuguese won the war. The Amerindian culture declined, giving space to a stronger Portuguese cultural domination. In order to control the wealth, the Portuguese Crown moved the capital of Brazil from Salvador, Bahia to Rio de Janeiro. Thousands of African slaves were brought to work in the gold mines.

They were landed in Rio de Janeiro and sent to other regions. By the late 18th century, Rio de Janeiro was an "African city": most of its inhabitants were slaves. No other place in the world had as many slaves since the end of the Roman Empire. In 1808 the Portuguese royal family, fleeing from Napoleon, took charge in Rio de Janeiro. Some 23,000 Portuguese nobles moved to Brazil. The change in region was significant, becoming more European.

After independence and principally after 1850, Southeast Brazil was "inundated" by European immigrants, who were attracted by the government to replace the African slaves in the coffee plantations. Most immigrants landed in the Port of Santos and have been forwarded to the coffee farms within São Paulo.

The vast majority of the immigrants came from Italy. Brazil attracted nearly 5 million immigrants between 1870 and 1953. The large number of Italians are visible in many parts of Southeast Brazil. Their descendants are nowadays predominant in many areas. For example, Northeast São Paulo is 45% Italian.

The arrival of immigrants from several parts of Europe, the Middle-East and Asia produced an ethnically diverse population. The city of Bastos, in São Paulo, is 11.4% Japanese. The city of São Paulo is home to the largest Japanese population outside Japan itself.

==== Northeast ====
Races in the Northeast Region (2022 census)
1. Mixed (59.6%)
2. White (26.7%)
3. Black (13.0%)
4. Indigenous (0.60%)
5. East Asian (0.10%)

According to the 2022 census, people reported as "Pardo" (brown) make up 59.6% of the population, Whites 26.7% and Blacks 13.0%.

The ethnic composition of the population starts in the 16th century. The Portuguese settlers brought few women, which led to relationships with the Indian women. Later, interracial relationships occurred between Portuguese males and African females. The coast, in the past the place where millions of African slaves arrived (mostly from modern-day Angola, Ghana, Nigeria and Benin) to work in sugarcane plantations, is where nowadays there is a predominance of Mulattoes, those of African and European ancestry. In the interior, there is a predominance of Indian and European mixture.

==== North ====
Races in the North Region (2022 census)
1. Mixed (67.2%)
2. White (20.7%)
3. Black (8.80%)
4. Indigenous (3.10%)
5. East Asian (0.20%)

According to the 2022 census, in the North Pardo (brown) make up 67.2% of the population, Whites 20.7%, Blacks 8.8%, Indigenous 3.1% and Yellow (Asian descent) 0.2% . Northern Brazil, largely covered by the Amazon rainforest, is the Brazilian region with the largest Amerindian influences, both in culture and ethnicity. Inhabited by diverse indigenous tribes, this part of Brazil was reached by Portuguese and Spanish colonists in the 17th century, but it started to be populated by non-Indians only in the late 19th and early 20th centuries. The exploitation of rubber used in the growing industries of automobiles, has emerged a huge migration to the region.

Many people from the poor Northeast Brazil, mostly Ceará, moved to the Amazon area. The contact between the Indians and the northeastern rubbers created the base of the ethnic composition of the region, with its mixed-race majority.

==== Central-West ====
Races in the Central-West Region (2022 census)
1. Mixed (52.4%)
2. White (37.0%)
3. Black (9.10%)
4. Indigenous (1.00%)
5. East Asian (0.40%)

According to the 2022 census, in the Central-West Pardo (brown) make up 52.4% of the population, Whites 37%, Blacks 9.1%, Indigenous 1.2% and Yellow (East-Asian descent) 0.4%. The Central-West region of Brazil was inhabited by diverse Indians when the Portuguese arrived in the early 18th century. The Portuguese came to explore the precious stones that were found there. Contact between the Portuguese and the Indians created a mixed-race population. Until the mid-20th century, Central-West Brazil had a very small population. The situation changed with the construction of Brasília, the new capital of Brazil, in 1960. Many workers were attracted to the region, mostly from northeastern Brazil.

A new wave of settlers started arriving from the 1970s. With the mechanization of agriculture in the South of Brazil, many rural workers of German and Italian origin migrated to Central-West Brazil. In some areas, they are already the majority of the population.

== Languages ==
Portuguese is the only official language of Brazil. It is spoken by nearly the entire population and is virtually the only language used in schools, newspapers, radio, TV and for all business and administrative purposes. Moreover, Brazil is the only Portuguese-speaking nation in the Americas, making the language an important part of Brazilian national identity.

Many Amerindian languages are spoken daily in indigenous communities, primarily in Northern Brazil. Although many of these communities have significant contact with Portuguese, there are incentives stimulating preservation and the teaching of native languages. According to SIL International, 133 Native American languages are currently endangered. Some of the largest indigenous language groups include Arawak, Carib, Macro-Gê and Tupi. In 2006, the municipality of São Gabriel da Cachoeira in the region of Cabeça do Cachorro (Northwestern region of the State of Amazonas), has adopted some indigenous languages as some of its other official languages along with Portuguese.

Other languages are spoken by descendants of immigrants, who are usually bilingual, in small rural communities in Southern Brazil. The most important are the Brazilian German dialects, such as Riograndenser Hunsrückisch and the East Pomeranian dialect, and also the Talian, based on the Italian Venetian language. There are also bilingual speakers of Polish, Ukrainian and Russian in Southern Brazil, especially Paraná. In the city of São Paulo, Levantine, Japanese, Chinese and Korean can be heard in the immigrant neighborhoods, such as Liberdade. Yiddish and Hebrew are used by Jewish communities mainly in São Paulo, Rio de Janeiro, Porto Alegre, Curitiba, Brasília, Belo Horizonte and Recife as well as the Vlax Romani dialect by Romani communities all across the nation.

== Religion ==
According to the IBGE census 2010 64.6% are Roman Catholics; 24% are Protestants and other Christians, 8% are agnostics, atheists or have no religion, 2% are followers of Spiritism, and 1% are members of other religions. Some of these religions are Jehovah's Witnesses (1,100,000 now 940,000), Latter-day Saints (200,000 now 1,500,000), Buddhism (215,000), Judaism (86,000), and Islam (27,000). In 2020, it was estimated that 48% were Roman Catholic; 33% Protestant; 14% irreligious; 2% Spiritist; 2% other Christian; 1% Afro-Brazilian religious; and 0.5% other. In another 2020 study by the Association of Religion Data Archives, Christians made up 90.77% of the population; among Christians, 70.57% were Roman Catholic; 15.12% Protestant; 12.23% Independents, 0.12% Orthodox, and 0.09% unaffiliated Christian. Kardecist spiritism was the second-largest religion practiced in Brazil as ARDA's 2020 study, with 4.83% of the population. Of its 3.03% irreligious population, 2.59% were agnostic and 0.44% atheist.

Brazil has the largest Roman Catholic population in the world.

Followers of Protestantism are rising in number. Until 1970, the majority of Brazilian Protestants were adherents of "traditional churches", mostly Lutherans, Presbyterians and Baptists. There are 120,000 Episcopalians in 9 dioceses (Anglican Episcopal Church of Brazil). Since then, numbers of Pentecostal and Neopentecostal adherents have increased significantly.

Islam in Brazil was first practiced by African slaves. The Muslim population in Brazil is made up mostly of Arab immigrants.

The largest population of Buddhists in Latin America lives in Brazil, due greatly to Brazil's large Japanese population.

== See also ==
- Race and ethnicity in Brazil
- Demographics of Rio de Janeiro
- List of largest cities in Brazil
- Racial democracy
- Brazilian Journal of Population Studies
- Internal migration in Brazil
