= 2022 Brazilian census =

Census of Brazil

Thirteenth census of Brazil
- 1 August 2022
- The Brazilian Institute of Geography and Statistics logo

General information
- Country: Brazil

Results
- Total population: 203,080,756 (▲6.47%)
- Most populous state: São Paulo (44,411,238)
- Least populous state: Roraima (636,707)

The 2022 Brazilian Census was the 13th national population census in Brazilian history, and took place on 1 August 2022. It was intended to take place in 2020, but postponed due to the COVID-19 pandemic and budgetary issues.

== Delays ==
Originally, the census, being carried out decennially, was supposed to take place in mid-2020. However, due to the current COVID-19 pandemic, the Brazilian Institute of Geography and Statistics changed the date to 2021.

However, in early 2021, the budget of census was cut from around 2 billion reais to 240 million, roughly 12% of the original budget. The census was pushed again, with Brazil's Supreme Court ruling that the government had to perform the census in 2022.

While the original reference date was 1 June 2022, the IBGE changed the date to 1 August 2022, due to the change in the company that would hire the workers.

== Population by federal unit and region ==
Population and population change in Brazil by federal unit
| Rank | Federal Unit | Population as of 2010 census | Population as of 2022 census | Change | Percent change | Percent of Brazil |
|---|---|---|---|---|---|---|
| 1 | São Paulo | 41,262,199 | 44,411,238 | ▲3,149,039 | ▲7.63% | 21.87% |
| 2 | Minas Gerais | 19,597,330 | 20,539,989 | ▲942,569 | ▲4.81% | 10.11% |
| 3 | Rio de Janeiro | 15,989,929 | 16,055,174 | ▲65,245 | ▲0.41% | 7.91% |
| 4 | Bahia | 14,016,906 | 14,141,626 | ▲124,720 | ▲0.89% | 6.96% |
| 5 | Paraná | 10,444,526 | 11,444,380 | ▲999,854 | ▲9.57% | 5.64% |
| 6 | Rio Grande do Sul | 10,693,929 | 10,882,965 | ▲189,036 | ▲1.77% | 5.36% |
| 7 | Pernambuco | 8,796,448 | 9,058,931 | ▲262,483 | ▲2.98% | 4.46% |
| 8 | Ceará | 8,452,381 | 8,794,957 | ▲342,576 | ▲4.05% | 4.33% |
| 9 | Pará | 7,581,051 | 8,120,131 | ▲539,080 | ▲7.11% | 4.00% |
| 10 | Santa Catarina | 6,248,436 | 7,610,361 | ▲1,361,925 | ▲21.80% | 3.75% |
| 11 | Goiás | 6,003,788 | 7,056,495 | ▲1,052,707 | ▲17.53% | 3.47% |
| 12 | Maranhão | 6,574,789 | 6,776,699 | ▲201,910 | ▲3.07% | 3.34% |
| 13 | Paraíba | 3,766,528 | 3,974,687 | ▲208,159 | ▲5.51% | 1.96% |
| 14 | Amazonas | 3,483,985 | 3,941,613 | ▲457,628 | ▲13.14% | 1.94% |
| 15 | Espírito Santo | 3,514,952 | 3,833,712 | ▲318,760 | ▲9.07% | 1.89% |
| 16 | Mato Grosso | 3,035,122 | 3,658,649 | ▲623,527 | ▲20.54% | 1.80% |
| 17 | Rio Grande do Norte | 3,168,027 | 3,302,729 | ▲134,702 | ▲4.25% | 1.63% |
| 18 | Piauí | 3,118,360 | 3,271,199 | ▲152,839 | ▲4.90% | 1.61% |
| 19 | Alagoas | 3,120,494 | 3,127,683 | ▲7,189 | ▲0.23% | 1.54% |
| 20 | Distrito Federal | 2,570,160 | 2,817,381 | ▲247,221 | ▲9.62% | 1.39% |
| 21 | Mato Grosso do Sul | 2,449,024 | 2,757,013 | ▲307,989 | ▲12.58% | 1.36% |
| 22 | Sergipe | 2,068,017 | 2,210,004 | ▲141,987 | ▲6.87% | 1.09% |
| 23 | Rondônia | 1,562,409 | 1,581,196 | ▲18,787 | ▲1.20% | 0.78% |
| 24 | Tocantins | 1,383,445 | 1,511,460 | ▲128,015 | ▲9.25% | 0.74% |
| 25 | Acre | 733,559 | 830,018 | ▲96,459 | ▲13.15% | 0.41% |
| 26 | Amapá | 669,526 | 733,759 | ▲64,233 | ▲9.59% | 0.36% |
| 27 | Roraima | 450,479 | 636,707 | ▲186,228 | ▲41.34% | 0.31% |

Population and population change in Brazil by region
| Rank | Region | Population as of 2010 census | Population as of 2022 census | Change | Percent change | Percent of Brazil |
|---|---|---|---|---|---|---|
| 1 | Southeast | 80,364,410 | 84,840,113 | ▲4,475,703 | ▲5.57% | 41.78% |
| 2 | Northeast | 53,081,950 | 54,658,515 | ▲1,576,565 | ▲2.97% | 26.91% |
| 3 | South | 27,386,891 | 29,937,706 | ▲2,550,815 | ▲9.31% | 14.74% |
| 4 | North | 15,864,454 | 17,354,884 | ▲1,490,430 | ▲9.39% | 8.55% |
| 5 | Central-West | 14,058,094 | 16,289,538 | ▲2,231,444 | ▲15.87% | 8.02% |

== See also ==
- Demographics of Brazil
