= Committee for International Cooperation in National Research in Demography =

The Committee for International Cooperation in National Research in Demography, commonly known as CICRED, is a non-governmental organization accredited with the Economic and Social Council of the United Nations. Founded in 1972, it aims at developing cooperation amongst national population research centres, and encouraging new research. It serves as a platform for interaction between research centres and international organizations, such as United Nations Population Division, United Nations Population Fund (UNFPA), World Health Organization (WHO) and Food and Agriculture Organization (FAO).

CICRED was run from its creation up to 1990 by Jean Bourgeois-Pichat, followed by Léon Tabah and then Philippe Collomb. Christophe Z Guilmoto became the new director in 2005. CICRED elected Francis Gendreau as its first Council Chair in 1993 and Gavin Jones in 2001.

CICRED today is an association of more than 700 research organizations dealing with population issues, from national statistical bureaux to research departments in demography. Its office is located in Paris in the premises of INED. The CICRED General Assembly consisting of the representatives of the member centres meets every four years during the IUSSP International Population Conference. The CICRED Council consists of seven members elected for four years by the members, three ex officio members from international organizations and is presided over by the chairperson. The Council decides on the administration of the Committee and on its strategic orientations.

Beyond its networking activities, CICRED conducts also international research programmes. It recently organized several conferences or seminars on subjects such aids and spatial mobility, demographic dividend, population-environment-development inter-relations or female deficit in Asia. It also published books and policy papers devoted to contemporary population issues.
