= Internal migration =

Movement of people for resettlement within a country

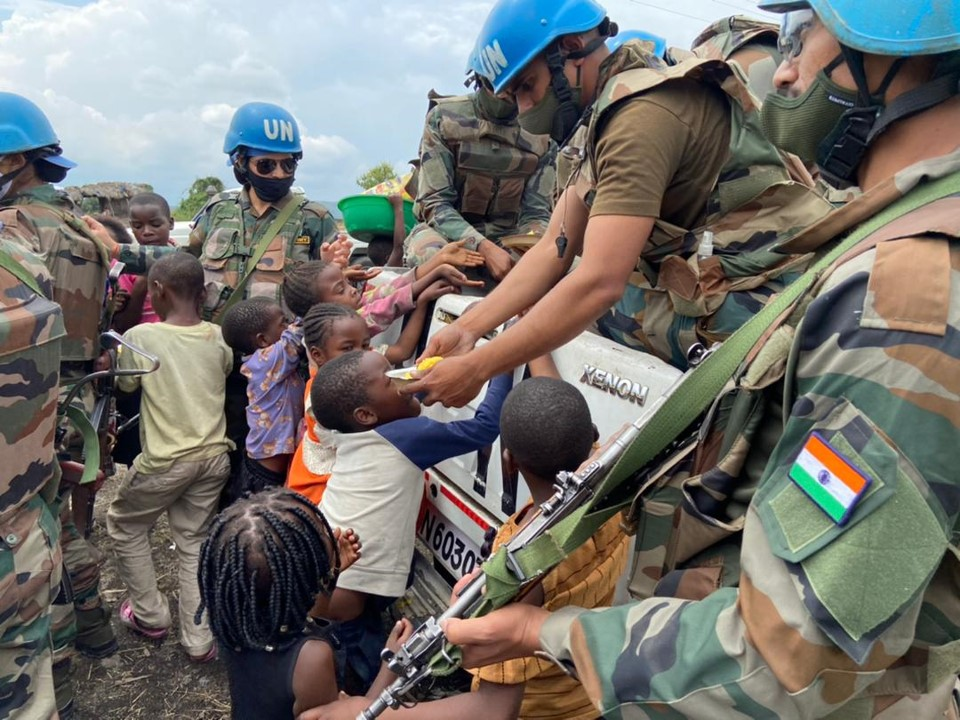
The 2021 volcanic eruption of Mount Nyiragongo caused domestic migration within the Democratic Republic of the Congo.

Internal migration or domestic migration is human migration within a country. Internal migration tends to be travel for education and for economic improvement or because of a natural disaster or civil disturbance, though a study based on the full formal economy of the United States found that the median post-move rise in income was only 1%.

A general trend of rural-to-urban migration, in a process described as urbanisation, has also produced a form of internal migration.

Internal migration is often contrasted with cross-border or international migration.

== History ==
Many countries have experienced massive internal migration.

- The United States has experienced the following major migrations:
  - A massive internal migration from the eastern states toward the west coast during the mid-19th century.
  - Three waves of large-scale migration of African Americans: first from the agricultural south to the industrialized northeast and midwest in the early 20th century, a second movement in the same direction with new additional destination to the West from roughly 1940 to 1970, and finally a reverse migration from other parts of the country to the urban south beginning in the late 20th century and continuing to the present.
  - The depopulation of the rural Great Plains since the early 20th century, with many rural counties today having less than 40% of their 1900 population.
  - A steady migration, starting during the Dust Bowl of the 1930s but accelerating after World War II, of all ethnicities toward the Sun Belt of the southern and western U.S.
  - An ongoing migration of mostly working- and middle-class people from California to other states since about 1990, called the California exodus.
  - A migration from Appalachia following World War II.
- The United Kingdom has historically seen several migrations from the north of England to the south, and also from Scotland, Ireland (more recently Northern Ireland) and Wales to England. This was most prevalent during the Industrial Revolution, and also in the aftermath of the Great Famine of Ireland.
- In New Zealand, the drift to the north has seen the South Island gradually losing population to the main urban area, Auckland, in the country's far north.
- In Philippines, due to a centralised government and almost unequal distribution of government power and funds, people from the provinces head to Metro Manila to look for better jobs and opportunities. This has been continuing since then, although in much smaller numbers now, with Metro Cebu and Metro Davao now increasingly becoming more popular as alternative destination for internal migrants.
- In Italy, during the country's economic miracle in the 1950s and 1960s, the so-called "industrial triangle" of Northwest Italy experienced waves of immigrants coming from Southern Italy, due to the southern portion of the country remaining underdeveloped and stricken with poverty. The peak was reached between 1955 and 1963, when as many as 1,300,000 southerners moved to the northern industrial cities. After a pause in the 1980s the north–south migration has resumed, this time headed to other areas of the north and Central Italy.
- In Brazil, between the 1950s to 1970s, had a strong migration of the population from the Northeast to the regions of São Paulo and Rio de Janeiro, due to the industrialization of Southeast of Brazil, in contrast to the drought and poverty of the Brazilian Northeast.
- In Portugal, during the aftermath of the Portuguese Colonial War from May 1974 to the end of 1970s, between 500,000 and 1 million of the majority European population of Portugal's colonies, known as the retornados, migrated to mainland Portugal, known then as the metropole.
- In China, following the country's initiation of economic reforms in 1979.

== Secondary migration ==
A subtype of internal migration is the migration of immigrant groups –often called secondary or onward migration. Secondary migration is also used to refer to the migration of immigrants within the European Union.

In the United States, the Office of Refugee Resettlement, a program of the U.S. Department of Health and Human Services's Administration for Children and Families, is tasked with managing the secondary migration of resettled refugees. However, there is little information on secondary migration and associated programmatic structural changes. Secondary migration has been hypothesised as one of the driving forces behind the distribution of resettled refugees in the United States.

== Methods for analysing internal migration ==
Various methodologies are proposed and used in the literature to analyse internal migration. Ravenstein used extensive cartographies to detail migration patterns. Slater employed networks to model migration. Goldade et al. employed geographical bounds and political affiliation of communities, in addition to utilizing network structures. Gursoy and Badur proposed signed network analysis, ego network analysis, representation learning, temporal stability analysis, community detection, and network visualization methods tailored for internal migration data and made their software available.

== See also ==
- Internally displaced person
- Internal colonialism
- Internal passport
- Foot voting
- Migrant worker
- White flight
- Open border
- Hawaiian diaspora
- Stateside Puerto Ricans
- Migrations from Poland since accession to the European Union
