= Transnational care =

Transnational Care refers to provision of care by family relations and friends across national borders.

== Defining and understanding transnational care ==
Loretta Baldassar has defined transnational caregiving as “the exchange of support and care across distance and national borders.” Transnational caregiving has emerged in to prominence due to globalization and global aging. Workforce mobility has increased not only across countries, but also with internal migration within countries. Typically people move from rural to urban areas for better opportunities. There are other factors like civil unrest in certain populations that can cause similar migration (see section on displaced person). Thus, the definition by Baldassar is broader and more largely applicable. With increased lifespan, more children are involved in care of older parents. In addition in China, its one-child policy has left families without siblings to share the responsibilities of caring for older parents.

Some of the factors that affect transnational caregiving like gender, socio-economic class and culture are similar to factors for local care. In transnational settings, there are also factors such as travel, finances and governmental relations that have a great influence.

== Components of transnational care ==
5 models of caregiving:

1. Economic: providing financial support to one's family back home.
2. Accommodation: providing a place to live.
3. Personal: providing companionship.
4. Practical: providing direct nursing care in activities of daily living.
5. Childcare, emotional and moral support

== Role of communication in transnational care ==
Information and communication technology (ICT) has affected provision of transnational care. Communication is an essential component in facilitating and enhancing the process of care. ICT has allowed transnational care to be reciprocal in nature and communication has enhanced intergenerational contact.

Recent COVID-19 pandemic has brought the anxieties of immigrant community into focus, and immigrants all over the world are seeking mental health care from their home countries through international physician networks.

Telemedicine through international medical organizations like www.Medinexo.com are effective in bridging this gap in care of transnational care providers.
