= Hailey's On It! =

American animated television series

- Genre: Action; Adventure; Comedy; Science fiction
- Created by: Devin Bunje; Nick Stanton
- Voices of: Auliʻi Cravalho; Manny Jacinto; Gary Anthony Williams
- Theme music composer: Matthew Tishler; Andrew Underberg
- Opening theme: "The Future's in My Hands" by Auliʻi Cravalho
- Ending theme: "The Future's in My Hands" (chorus)
- Composers: Matthew Tishler; Andrew Underberg
- Country of origin: United States
- Original language: English
- No. of seasons: 1
- No. of episodes: 30 (56 segments)

Production
- Executive producers: Devin Bunje; Nick Stanton
- Producer: Wade Wisinski
- Editor: Matt Brailey
- Running time: 22–24 minutes
- Production company: Disney Television Animation

Original release
- Network: Disney Channel
- Release: June 8, 2023 – May 18, 2024

Hailey's On It! is an American animated science fiction action television series created by Devin Bunje and Nick Stanton and produced by Disney Television Animation that aired on Disney Channel from June 8, 2023, to May 18, 2024.

In the series, a 14-year-old girl from the Hawaiian diaspora is informed by a time-traveling scientist that she is destined to save the entire planet by reversing global warming. To accomplish this, she has to complete a series of tasks and to overcome her fears. Meanwhile, time-traveling robots are trying to prevent her from ever accomplishing her goals.

On October 2, 2024, it was reported that the series was cancelled after one season.

== Synopsis ==
Set in Oceanside, California, the series centers on Hailey Banks, a 14-year-old girl who is averse to taking risks. Her life gets turned upside down during her New Year's celebration when she is visited by a scientist from the future, who reveals that completing a long list of tasks she created is crucial for initiating a series of events that will lead to her inventing a device that will be used to save the entire planet by reversing global warming.

Now, Hailey must overcome her fears, complete impossible and impractical tasks, and face her feelings toward her best friend, Scott Denoga. However, some of her accomplishments will be threatened by Chaos Bots, small robots from the future sent by a mysterious villain who wants to prevent her from finishing her list and saving the world.

== Characters ==
=== Main ===
- Hailey Banks (voiced by Auliʻi Cravalho) is a 14-year-old Hawaiian–American girl who is averse to taking risks and now has to overcome her insecurities and fears to save the world. She has a crush on Scott, her best friend, though he is completely oblivious to this and only sees her as a close friend.
- Scott Denoga (voiced by Manny Jacinto) is a 14-year-old clumsy yet fun-loving Filipino–Korean boy and Hailey's best friend whom she has to kiss to prevent the end of the world, but chooses to do it last on her list as it could ruin their friendship.
- Beta (voiced by Gary Anthony Williams) is an AI operating system from the future who lists out Hailey's accomplishments. He has a contentious relationship with Scott.

=== Recurring ===
- Kai Banks (voiced by Cooper Andrews) is Hailey's Hawaiian father.
- Patricia Banks (née Phlorange) (voiced by Julie Bowen) is Hailey's Caucasian mother. She is a realtor but was once a breakdancer in music videos.
- A.C. Aychvak (voiced by Josh Brener) is Hailey's rival, although the rivalry is mostly one-sided. He is spoiled and willing to cheat to win, sometimes with the aid of small robots. His catchphrase is "What the beans?"
- The Professor (voiced by Sarah Chalke) is a mysterious, unnamed scientist from the future.
- Rebecca "Becker" Denoga (voiced by Judy Alice Lee) is Scott's troublemaking, tomboyish, and destructive younger sister. She initially develops a crush on Hailey but is able to move on from it when Hailey doesn't reciprocate any feelings for her. She later begins a relationship with her former school rival, Kennedy.
  - Bonesaw, Buzzsaw (voiced by Nik Shriner), Chainsaw (voiced by Kyle S. More), and Paul (voiced by Billy Kametz and Eric Bauza) are Becker's friends.
- Kristine Sanchez (voiced by Amanda Leighton) is a popular girl who, despite being somewhat self-absorbed, is very cheerful and friendly to everyone and attends the same school as Hailey and Scott. She is a fashionista who specializes in hats. While Hailey has been shown to dislike Kristine's overly cheerful personality at first, she does start to open up to her in the episode "Road Trippin'." In "The Beginning of the Friend," Kristine begins to date Scott. However, she later breaks up with him in the episode "U.F. Whoa!".
- Sunny Denoga (voiced by Joy Osmanski) is Scott and Becker's mother.
- Thad (voiced by Nik Dodani) is one of Hailey's classmates and in a relationship with Jonathan.
- Jonathan (voiced by Nico Santos) is one of Hailey's classmates and in a relationship with Thad.
- Dwayne and Johnson Banks are Hailey's twin baby brothers. Their names are a reference to Dwayne Johnson, who co-starred with Hailey's voice actress Auliʻi Cravalho in the Disney film Moana.
- Frank (vocal effects by Dee Bradley Baker) is the Banks' pet flamingo. He is in a relationship with Scott's pet peacock, Petey.
- Lucy (voiced by Sydney Mikayla) is Hailey's clumsy classmate.
- Kennedy (voiced by Shara Kirby) is Becker's perfectionist girlfriend and former school rival.
- Bill Board (voiced by Carlos Alazraqui) is a local businessman who appears in several episodes. He runs a company that puts up billboards, appropriately to his name, and has also acquired several other local companies (often in bets or games with other businesspeople).
- Genesis (voiced by Erica Lindbeck) is Hailey's popular classmate.

=== Guest ===
- Brian Jordan Alvarez as David Whale
- Blake Anderson as Swagmeister
- Mick Foley as Rowdy Russ Stanton
- Jared Goldstein as Leo Whale
- Jo Koy as Eddie Denoga, Scott's father
- Jack McBrayer as Lazlo, a UFO conspiracy theorist
- Bebe Neuwirth as Barbara "Babs Cadabs" Cadabra
- Chris Parnell as:
  - Robert Vandertrache, an obnoxious billionaire
  - The narrator for a hair-product warning video
  - Klaus Gimlet, the headmaster of a luge academy
- Tim Robinson as Kelly Hardmeier
- Natasha Rothwell as Carla, a local animal shelter owner
- Brandon Mychal Smith as JT
- Martin Starr as Cody, an escape room attendant
- Al Yankovic as:
  - Chip Dingle, the owner of Dingles Chips (a parody of Pringles)
  - Himself in a hairdo warning video
- Maribeth Monroe as Ms. Ohlson
- Dana Snyder as Sparky La Russo
- Chris Wylde as Finn Skulby
- Grey DeLisle as Anita
- Charlie Schlatter as Tommy D
- Billy Kametz (Note: This is Billy Kametz's final performance prior to his death on June 9, 2022.) as Road Rash and Paul
- Kerri Kenney-Silver as Gretchen Aychvak
- Karan Brar as Sanjay Singh
- Cristina Vee as Blabby Abby

Additionally, Auliʻi Cravalho "guest stars" as Kelci Fyre, a pop star who looks and sounds like Hailey.

== Episodes ==
No.	Title	Directed by	Written by	Storyboard by	Original release date	Prod. code	U.S. viewers (millions)
1	"The Beginning of the Friend"	Howy Parkins	Devin Bunje & Nick Stanton	Troy Adomitis, Kurt Dumas, Cat Harman-Mitchell, Casey Keith-Kolodin & Steven Umbleby	June 8, 2023	101	0.14
Hailey Banks is a resourceful teenager who is averse to taking risks, but this changes when a crazed professor from the future tells her that she must complete all the items on her to-do list to save the world. She is aided by her best friend and secret crush, Scott Denoga, and a talking phone named Beta. Hailey's newest list item is to ride all the rides at the county fair, including the Zero Gravitron, the scariest ride at the fair. During the ride, a group of Chaos Bots, who are trying to stop Hailey from completing her list, cause the Zero Gravitron to malfunction, but Hailey is able to stop the ride and save the day. Afterward, Kristine Sanchez, the most popular girl at Hailey's school, starts dating Scott, much to her chagrin, as one of the items on her list is to kiss Scott.
2	"Beta'd and Hooked"	Leslie Park	Lindsey Reckis	Lauren McKinley & Jim Shellhorn	June 8, 2023	102	0.10
2	"The Wild, Wild Mess"	Cat Harman-Mitchell	Yolie Cortez	Ryan Agustin, Tom Caulfield, Ben Holm & Jim Shellhorn	June 8, 2023	102	0.10
"Beta'd and Hooked": On the day of the Fish Taco Festival, Hailey, Scott, and Beta set out to catch a blue Ono fish called One-Eyed Jack, who had presumably attacked Hailey's father, Kai, once, to win the contest and complete another item on Hailey's list. While fishing on Hailey's Uncle Chunk's boat, Beta falls off the boat but is rescued by Jack, who turns out to be a very nice fish (Kai had misunderstood, and the fish was actually rescuing him). Hailey and Scott use fish sticks for their taco instead, which wins first prize, although by default, as the judge didn't eat any of the other tacos. "The Wild, Wild Mess": At a reenactment of a western town, Hailey participates in a competition to become Sheriff for a Day and (thanks to being several years older than the other entrants) wins very easily, completing another item on her list. However, a dirt bike gang comes to wreak havoc around the town thanks to several videos Scott posted while riding his bike. Hailey decides to take on the leader, Road Rash, in a "bike-off" with the help of Betsy, a horse who was rejected by her previous owner in favor of a dirt bike, and they win. Hailey then passes off her sheriff's badge to a young girl who admires her heroism.
3	"The Last Sand"	Cat Harman-Mitchell	Marty Donovan	Cat Harman-Mitchell, Anthony Imperato & Jim Shellhorn	June 17, 2023 (Note: This episode was first released on Disney+ on June 9, 2023.)	103	0.12
3	"The Show Must Go Wrong"	Leslie Park	Kevin Yee	Brad Goodchild, Casey Keith-Kolodin, Lauren McKinley & Leslie Park	June 17, 2023	103	0.12
"The Last Sand": Hailey and her father enter a sandcastle-building competition, giving her an opportunity to complete an item on her list by winning it. However, Hailey's self-proclaimed rival, A.C. Aychvak, has also entered the contest. He uses an army of small robots to help him build his castle, while Hailey recruits crabs to help build her own. Eventually, A.C. reveals a giant fan to blow away her castle, but Beta brings a squadron of pelicans to dump water on A.C.'s. However, this results in everyone's castles being ruined. Fortunately, Hailey's father has the only castle left standing, thanks to his "triple-packing" technique, which, despite being very time-consuming, makes the castle very sturdy. As a result, Hailey and her father win by default. "The Show Must Go Wrong": Kristine is putting on a school musical she wrote called "Hats", which is an opportunity for Hailey to complete another item on her list by participating in a musical. She is initially nervous, but with help, she manages to overcome her fears and gets a non-speaking role as a hat rack. Scott is also involved in the musical as Kristine's duet partner. However, during the performance, Kristine is blinded by a spotlight and falls off a platform, injuring herself and unable to continue. Scott attempts to perform the duet himself but fails miserably. Watching from the sidelines, Hailey gathers the courage to join him, and they end up performing the duet flawlessly, making the show a success.
4	"Cubix Dudes"	Leslie Park	Karen Graci	Brad Goodchild, Casey Keith-Kolodin & Jim Shellhorn	June 17, 2023	107	0.10
4	"Cos-played"	Cat Harman-Mitchell	Lindsey Reckis	Inbal Breda & Brad Goodchild	June 17, 2023	107	0.10
"Cubix Dudes": During a show by the performance artists "Cubix Dudes", Hailey and Scott discuss the former's next list item: taking a photo of herself with a strawberry moon owl. However, one of the Cubix Dudes injures his wrist, and the group recruits Scott, who turns out to have a talent for solving Rubik's cubes, to take his place. As a result, he is too busy to help Hailey with preparations for the owl, and after an argument, he goes off alone to join the Cubix Dudes on stage. However, a conversation with her father makes Hailey realize that it's important to support Scott, and she watches his performance. In addition, a photo taken of Hailey and Scott afterward includes the owl, thus completing the list item after all. "Cos-played": After Hailey completes her 50th list item, the Professor (in a holographic recording) tells her about a mysterious orb in her closet. Hailey uses the orb to complete her cosplay for a convention that Chan Yee, the creator of her favorite comic book series, will be attending (getting her autograph is another of Hailey's list items). However, while waiting in line, a group of bullies tricks Scott, Beta, and her into giving up their spots. Hailey's attempts to fight back result in the lead bully breaking her orb. She soon discovers that the orb was intended for contacting the Professor, who heard the commotion and arrives with cosplay-dressed allies who scare the bullies away, allowing Hailey and the gang to get back in line and obtain the autograph.
5	"Road Trippin'" (Note: Originally called "Spend ALL my Gift Cards")	Leslie Park	Devin Bunje & Nick Stanton	Casey Keith-Kolodin, Leslie Park & Jim Shellhorn	June 24, 2023	105	0.15
5	"Escape Doom"	Cat Harman-Mitchell	Marty Donovan	Ryan Agustin & Anthony Imperato	June 24, 2023	105	0.15
"Road Trippin'": Hailey's latest list item is to go on a shopping spree by using all the gift cards she has ever been given. She and Scott manage to spend all her cards except for a $10 gift card to a burger joint called Butter Burger, which closed down due to health code violations. Fortunately, Beta finds one last Butter Burger restaurant open in Arizona, and Hailey and Scott take a bus there with Kristine joining them (as Scott had invited her to come since it's their "45-day anniversary" of dating). Throughout the trip, Kristine feels uncomfortable and left out and ultimately breaks down when she loses her favorite hat in the restaurant's ball pit. Kristine confesses to Hailey that she feels jealous of the latter's close friendship with Scott, while Hailey admits that she was afraid of losing Scott's friendship. The two girls eventually become friends. "Escape Doom": Hailey, Scott, and Kristine go to an escape room to complete another item on Hailey's list. They are unexpectedly joined by A.C., who wants to prove that he is smarter than Hailey by leading the group. In the first room, A.C. solves all the puzzles with ease, but in the second room, he is completely useless, and he is forced to admit that he cheated by memorizing a tutorial for the first room. Shortly after, a group of Chaos Bots arrives and rigs the escape room, causing the walls to close in on the gang and crush them. Hailey is forced to overcome her fear of leading and assigns everyone (including A.C.) a task to help them escape. They manage to succeed, although A.C. ends up taking credit for saving everyone.
6	"The Flamingo Must Flamin-Go"	Cat Harman-Mitchell	Kevin Yee	Anthony Imperato & Jim Shellhorn	June 24, 2023	106	0.16
6	"Splatter of the Bands"	Leslie Park	Written by : Kevin Yee; Story by : Alison Wong & Kevin Yee	Ben Holm & Kaden Westbrook	June 24, 2023	106	0.16
"The Flamingo Must Flamin-Go": Hailey decides to go to the local animal shelter to adopt a pet since that is another item on her list to complete, even though her mother, Patricia, does not allow her to adopt pets due to a childhood incident. At the animal shelter, Hailey finds that the only available animal is a smelly, old flamingo named Frank, who goes crazy when he notices shrimp. After Hailey fails to train Frank to convince Patricia to let him stay, the flamingo escapes and is exposed to Hailey's family. As Patricia and Hailey are about to take Frank back, the former gets a call from her clients, who are selling their house. After Frank makes a mess of the sellers' house because they have a shrimp tray, the sellers begin to insult Patricia, who, in turn, tells them off and allows Hailey to keep Frank. "Splatter of the Bands": Hailey wants to enter the "Splatter of the Bands", a contest where people throw tomatoes at a singer if they make mistakes; performing will complete another item on her list if she doesn't get pelted with tomatoes. She soon learns that her father and his friends are entering the contest and joins them. However, they want to be splattered with tomatoes, much to Hailey's chagrin and confusion. While they are rehearsing, Hailey meets a European band, and they invite her to perform a song with them, citing her great singing voice, which she accepts. However, the duo complains about even the slightest mistakes, and Hailey regrets her decision. On the contest day, Hailey's father starts singing with his friends, and Hailey ultimately decides to rejoin them. Ultimately, no one throws tomatoes at them, completing Hailey's list item. However, when her father and his bandmates admit disappointment over not being pelted, Hailey starts singing another song with them and gets splattered. Afterward, the European band starts singing, but they are pelted almost immediately.
7	"Bringing Home the Beacon"	Cat Harman-Mitchell	Karen Graci	Ryan Agustin & Anthony Imperato	July 1, 2023	108	N/A
7	"Dance Like No Mom is Watching"	Leslie Park	Lindsey Reckis	Ryan Agustin & Kaden Westbrook	July 1, 2023	108	N/A
"Bringing Home the Beacon": Patricia owns a disused lighthouse inherited from her and Hailey's ancestor that has a history of the ancestor building it and mistakenly mounting the light pointing the wrong way, flooding the town with light and making him a laughing stock to the shame of his family. Hailey decides to try to fix the lighthouse to complete a list item that involves her fixing something for her mother. However, Patricia is already trying to sell the lighthouse to a businessman who plans to demolish it. Hailey and her friends undertake a project to renovate the lighthouse, which initially seems to succeed. However, the project ultimately goes awry, producing a light resembling a disco ball. Despite this, the site becomes attractive as an event venue, and Patricia decides not to sell it. "Dance Like No Mom is Watching": With Beta taking time off to install an upgrade, Hailey decides to choose and complete a list item on her own, picking one to achieve the high score in a dance video game. After putting in a lot of effort, she finally manages to complete the final level and achieve a score above the previous high. In the process, she discovers that her mother had a secret history of dancing in music videos years earlier, and her moves help Hailey learn how to beat the game. However, when Beta returns from his upgrade, he informs Hailey that she had already achieved the high score on the game (the previous high score she beat was her own), but didn't remember it due to a brain freeze from eating a cold dessert.
8	"Kristine-ceañera"	Leslie Park	Yolie Cortez	Ryan Agustin, Brad Goodchild & Casey Keith-Kolodin	July 1, 2023	109	N/A
8	"The Puffle Kerfuffle"	Leslie Park	Marty Donovan	Brad Goodchild, Lauren McKinley & Jim Shellhorn	July 1, 2023	109	N/A
"Kristine-ceañera": Kristine is celebrating her quinceañera, but she is annoyed at her father's interference, changing the ceremony in ways that suit the way he wants it rather than what she wants. In particular, he wants her to dance with Javier, somebody he finds a more suitable match for her than Scott. Javier and Scott end up in a hot sauce eating contest for the right to dance with Kristine, something that Kristine herself dislikes as she's turned off by this sort of macho display. While both guys reach the hottest sauce in the array, Javier ultimately wins. However, Kristine then takes control by eating the legendarily hot Black Scorpion chili pepper whole and dancing with Scott. Kristine's father apologizes for being so controlling. "The Puffle Kerfuffle": One of Hailey's list items is to attend a taping of the Puffles show, featuring singer/dancer/TV host duo Kylie and Thacher, who proclaimed themselves best friends in their act. However, it turns out the show went off the air five years earlier. When Hailey goes to the TV station to ask why, she finds out that the station owner would like to continue airing the popular show, but the hosts called it quits after their friendship ended over a kiss. This hits Hailey personally, as she fears the same might happen to her and Scott's friendship should she complete the item of kissing Scott on her list. She then schemes to reunite them for a show, with them ultimately performing together one more time, after which she discovers that the two were never actually best friends; Thacher's childhood friend was Bailey, whom he ultimately married. Bailey turns out to be uncannily similar to Hailey in terms of interests, making Hailey more confident about her relationship with Scott.
9	"Flippin' Out"	Leslie Park	Kevin Yee	Inbal Breda, Brad Goodchild, Jim Shellhorn & Kaden Westbrook	July 8, 2023	111	N/A
9	"Smells Like Queen Spirit" (Note: Originally called "Win the Homecoming Crown")	Leslie Park	Yolie Cortez & Lindsey Reckis	Ben Holm & Kaden Westbrook	July 8, 2023	111	N/A
"Flippin' Out": To distract from the failure to capture a Chaos Bot, Beta suggests that Hailey get a varsity letter to complete another item on her list and improve her physical skills. She chooses cheerleading because she thinks it will be easy, but after meeting with Kristine and the rest of the squad, she discovers that it is much more difficult than she could imagine. After clumsy cheerleader Lucy is taken out of commission, Hailey is forced to replace her. She soon takes cheerleading seriously when Bored Murray, a notoriously uninterested student, arrives to watch their final game. Hailey impresses Murray with the "flying swordfish" technique and gets her varsity letter. Afterward, she uses her new skills to capture another Chaos Bot successfully. "Smells Like Queen Spirit": Hailey, Scott, and Beta dissect the Chaos Bot and pull out its communication device, where they learn that another Chaos Bot in disguise has infiltrated Hailey and Scott's school. Meanwhile, Hailey must win her school's Crab Queen Pageant, which will complete another item on her list. However, she soon finds herself forced to compete against a new student, the robot-like Joanne Droid. Hailey and Scott are convinced that Joanne is the disguised Chaos Bot and try to out her, but realize that she is simply an "eccentric Canadian" and face the real Chaos Bot: a giant crab. With Joanne's help, Hailey and Scott defeat the Chaos Bot.
10	"Catching Felines" (Note: Originally called "Make a Female Friend")	Cat Harman-Mitchell	Alison Wong	Brad Goodchild	July 8, 2023	104	N/A
10	"It's All Gonna Be OK-Pop"	Cat Harman-Mitchell	James Alexander	Inbal Breda, Brad Goodchild & Jim Shellhorn	July 8, 2023	104	N/A
"Catching Felines": Hailey's next list item is to make a female friend, which surprises Scott. Despite his warnings, Hailey becomes friends with his younger sister, Becker, a rambunctious troublemaker. The two of them manage to get along fine, and when Hailey mentions that she and Scott are planning to buy some Wild Katz sneakers, Becker promises that she can get them for her. The next day, Hailey discovers two wild pumas in her front yard. Convinced that Becker had misinterpreted her request, she and Scott try to return them to the wildlife sanctuary, only to receive a call from Becker, who reveals that she had received the shoes as promised. The pumas escape and chase Hailey and Scott, but they are rescued by Becker, who is offended that Hailey had thought the worst about her. Hailey apologizes and admits she would like to hang out with her again. As Hailey and Scott leave, Becker is convinced that Hailey is into her. "It's All Gonna Be OK-Pop": Hailey and Scott manage to win tickets to see the K-pop boy band Seoul M8S, with the former's next list item being to get noticed by band member Cute Jun. However, their plans are soon put to a halt when Kai and Patricia remind Hailey that she promised to babysit her younger brothers, Dwayne and Johnson. After they leave, Hailey and Scott decide to take Dwayne and Johnson to the concert with them. While there, Hailey also sees Patricia at the concert and tries to avoid her. She and Scott succeed in getting Cute Jun to notice them, and, along with Dwayne and Johnson, they dance on stage together. Patricia catches them, but Hailey points out her hypocrisy, and both agree not to tell Kai anything when they get home. Note: Both episodes chronologically take place before "The Show Must Go Wrong" and "Dance Like No Mom is Watching", respectively.
11	"U.F. Whoa!"	Howy Parkins	Written by : Devin Bunje & Nick Stanton; Story by : Devin Bunje, Yolie Cortez, Nick Stanton & Kevin Yee	Troy Adomitis, Brad Goodchild, Anthony Imperato & Lauren McKinley	July 15, 2023	110	N/A
A Chaos Bot is spotted by the people of Oceanside, who are convinced that an extraterrestrial is in town. Meanwhile, Kristine tries to get on the reality show Hat House. Hailey, Scott, and Beta manage to lure the Chaos Bot to them and destroy it. However, in the process, Beta is captured by N.O.P.E. (the National Organization of Paranormal Extraterrestrials). The Professor gives Hailey a new AI named Omega, but Hailey wants Beta back, and Omega agrees to help her. Hailey and Scott break into N.O.P.E. headquarters, where they find the Chaos Bot's remains. Its battery reveals an insignia that Hailey had previously made up, making her question if she created the Chaos Bots. Hailey and Scott manage to rescue Beta and escape. Later, the Professor reveals that the insignia is for an energy element that Hailey discovers in the future, which powers everything, including the Chaos Bots. After the Professor leaves, Scott reveals that not only has Kristine gotten onto Hat House, but she has also broken up with him, making the "Kiss Scott Denoga" item on Hailey's list more likely to be completed.
12	"Seas the Day"	Cat Harman-Mitchell	James Alexander & Marty Donovan	Ryan Agustin, Inbal Breda & Nicole Fridrich	July 22, 2023	112	0.14
12	"Kissed Opportunities"	Cat Harman-Mitchell	Mary Gulino	Ryan Agustin, Nicole Fridrich & Brad Goodchild	July 22, 2023	112	0.14
"Seas the Day": Scott is depressed over Kristine breaking up with him, so Hailey decides to cheer him up by taking him to Catalina Island, with Beta suggesting that they eat at a restaurant so that she can be open with her feelings. Hailey initially fails to cheer Scott up, but after a near-death experience, he returns to his usual happy self and they go to eat at the restaurant. While there, Hailey gets a call from Kristine, who reveals that despite breaking up with Scott, she does not want anyone to date him, resulting in Hailey ruining the moment she was going to use to open up to Scott and getting kicked out of the restaurant. Scott thanks Hailey for the day, although now she is feeling sad. "Kissed Opportunities": Hailey tries to throw a cool party to complete another list item. However, the only people who show up are A.C. (who wasn't invited), Becker (who quickly leaves), Thad, Jonathan, Lucy, and Murray. Genesis, a popular girl that Hailey managed to invite, shows up and has everyone play the Kissy Kards card game, which Hailey decides to use as an excuse to kiss Scott in a platonic manner. The game results in everyone doing or admitting to something embarrassing. Hailey finally gets the kiss card for Scott, but realizes that the kiss would be disingenuous and forfeits, admitting that she hates the game. Genesis admits that she, too, didn't like it, and everyone decides to party as Hailey intended.
13	"Sight for Dinosaur Eyes"	Leslie Park	Marty Donovan	Nicole Fridrich, Anthony Imperato, Casey Keith-Kolodin, Morgan Shandro & Kaden Westbrook	July 29, 2023	113	N/A
13	"Along for the Slide"	Cat Harman-Mitchell	Written by : James Alexander; Story by : James Alexander & Alison Wong	Nicole Fridrich & Lauren McKinley	July 29, 2023	113	N/A
"Sight for Dinosaur Eyes": Feeling that most of the list revolves around Hailey, Scott suggests that she do something for him for once, as he has his own list full of ridiculous items. Before Hailey can respond, the Professor accidentally leaves behind blueprints for a mysterious device, and Hailey becomes distracted by building it. To make up for it, Hailey takes Scott and Beta to Jurassic Journey, a low-budget theme park, which, in actuality, she is using as an excuse to find the material she needs to complete the device. The device turns out to be a growth ray, and she accidentally enlarges an iguana. Beta increases his own size to combat it, and Hailey realizes that since she created the device in the future, she has also likely incorporated reverse features, shrinking the iguana and Beta back to their normal sizes. Hailey apologizes for shirking Scott, but he is happy that they completed an item on his list: see a real kaiju fight. "Along for the Slide": Hailey and Scott ask Beta for something fun, and he suggests climbing Mt. Oceanside. Becker just so happens to be going there to try the abandoned alpine slides, but she has secretly gotten over her crush on Hailey and finds it awkward. On the hike, the three are joined by Kennedy, a girl whom Becker considers her rival due to her by-the-book behavior. Kennedy ends up being great help to the group, much to Becker's chagrin, but when she tries to sneak away to the slides, Kennedy follows her, and they end up on a runaway slide. Kennedy admits that she likes her, and Becker finally reciprocates. Afterwards, Becker tells Hailey that they should just remain friends, confusing her as she had no idea that she had a crush on her.
14	"Leather Jacket Hailey"	Cat Harman-Mitchell	Mary Gulino	Ryan Agustin, Inbal Breda, Nicole Fridrich, Brad Goodchild, Anthony Imperato & Lauren McKinley	August 5, 2023	114	0.10
14	"In a Pinch"	Leslie Park	Kevin Yee	Nicole Fridrich, Rhya Voskuil & Kaden Westbrook	August 5, 2023	114	0.10
"Leather Jacket Hailey": Hailey feels that she is being pushed around and taken advantage of, and is further incensed when Kristine returns to Oceanside for her show Hat House and has Hailey assist her. Hailey comes across a leather jacket that suddenly makes her more confident and tough. This results in her blowing off her duties, but making everyone else around her take control of their own situations. The rest of the kids assisting Kristine get the wrong idea from Hailey and plant an explosive in one of her hats. Hailey uses the jacket to muffle the explosion before giving a speech to everyone about being open with your feelings. Scott gives modeling a try, though he quickly loses interest, and Hailey openly gets mad at her science project partner. "In a Pinch": Hailey is tasked with looking after Clawdia, the school's crab mascot, by Ms. Jackson. However, Hailey is distracted by her current task of removing all the coins from her father's old couch, so she asks Scott to look after her. He accidentally leaves her in a bathtub with hot water, and the two believe that she is dead. Seeing as how Clawdia needs to be at a tetherball tournament that evening, Scott uses his marionette skills to make Clawdia look alive. Clawdia eventually does come back to life, and Ms. Jackson reveals that Clawdia has a habit of falling unconscious. Hailey uses Clawdia to get the last coin out of the couch just in time for Patricia to sell it, though Kai ends up buying it back.
15	"The Fart of War"	Leslie Park	Mary Gulino	Brad Goodchild, Anthony Imperato, Morgan Shandro & Rhya Voskuil	August 12, 2023	115	0.10
15	"Who Let the Dogs Out? (Hailey)"	Leslie Park	Lindsey Reckis	Brad Goodchild & Rhya Voskuil	August 12, 2023	115	0.10
"The Fart of War": For an app-making competition by the Swag Bros, Scott comes up with an app called Fart Blink. A.C. thinks it is ridiculous, but he makes it anyway, and it becomes a hit. The two become partners, but A.C. begins to claim the app for himself. The case is presented in a mock trial, with Hailey representing Scott and A.C. representing himself. Hailey presents a strong argument, while A.C. offers a very weak one. The trial rules in favor of Scott, but all he wanted was a jar of Dingles, much to Hailey's chagrin. In a bit of irony, Scott wins a Golden Dingle while A.C. learns that the Swag Bros do not want to develop his app any further due to their laziness. "Who Let the Dogs Out? (Hailey)": Hailey becomes convinced that the Dingles company tests their chips on beagles after reading a bag of Auntie Bland's chips stating that they do not test on dogs. She starts to believe information about Dingles on the internet and adds a new item to her list to free the beagles. With Scott's Golden Dingle, they are able to go into the factory and meet Chip Dingle, the happy-go-lucky owner. To Hailey, Scott, and Beta's surprise, they find out that the factory is run by beagles who are financially capable. Chip reveals that he tests the chips while the beagles handle all the money issues. Feeling bad, Hailey decides to let the beagles out and play, which Chip equates to them having vacation time. In the end, it is revealed that Auntie Bland herself wrote the false information about Dingles.
16	"Beta's Gonna Hate"	Leslie Park	Marty Donovan	Brad Goodchild & Casey Keith-Kolodin	September 29, 2023	116	N/A
16	"The A-maize-ing Maze"	Cat Harman-Mitchell	Written by : Kevin Yee; Story by : Karen Graci & Kevin Yee	Ryan Augustin, Brad Goodchild, Morgan Shandro & Jim Shellhorn	September 29, 2023	116	N/A
"Beta's Gonna Hate": Patricia brings home a cleaning robot named Alphred, who immediately takes an interest in Beta. Beta, on the other hand, is suspicious of him and believes he is a Chaos Bot in disguise. While Hailey, Scott, and Kai hold an indoor Olympics, Beta starts to suspect that Alphred is stalking him. Eventually, Alphred and Beta battle each other within their coding, and Alphred comes to the conclusion that he is, in fact, Beta's father, or rather, his great-great-grandfather. Beta is relieved, and Alphred is ultimately taken back to the lab, but not before Beta finally gets a sense of belonging. "The A-maize-ing Maze": Hailey wants to complete a corn maze, as it is one of the items on her list, but is reluctant to bring Scott along, as he uses terrible methods to get through. Scott and Becker get distracted, and Hailey and Beta traverse the maze alone, only to get lost in a vacant spot with a scarecrow. Hailey and Beta become despondent, with the former recording a message about her feelings for Scott. Eventually, Hailey realizes that they have a method to send a signal and are found by Scott, Becker, and Farmer Felicia. Scott and Becker reveal that they completed the maze quickly and that it was Hailey, not Scott, who is bad at solving mazes.
17	"I Know What You Did Last Slumber"	Leslie Park	Mary Gulino	Inbal Breda & Morgan Shandro	October 14, 2023	117	0.10
17	"Lady and the Trampoline"	Cat Harman-Mitchell	Karen Graci	Ryan Agustin, Nicole Fridrich & Morgan Shandro	October 14, 2023	117	0.10
"I Know What You Did Last Slumber": Hailey holds a sleepover with Lucy, Becker, and Kennedy so that she can complete a list item that has her pulling an all-nighter. Kennedy goes to sleep early while Hailey, Lucy, and Becker pull a prank on Scott. They then attempt to craft bomb A.C.'s new jet ski, but it somehow detaches, rolls off a cliff, and explodes. The girls become nervous and try to hide their involvement. The authorities blame their friend Tina for the crime, but Hailey comes clean, only for Kennedy to conclude that it was A.C. himself who detached the jet ski, causing it to get destroyed. A.C. admits the wrongdoing and is forced to do five hours of beach cleanup as punishment. "Lady and the Trampoline": After mocking Beta, Hailey is tasked with completing the Big Bounce at Trampoline Town. Hailey is afraid to do so because a trio of older kids mocked her when she tried to initially. She manages to face her fear, and Scott agrees to distract the teens while she completes the Big Bounce. She is forced to wear a mask when Bill Board adds a camera for everyone to see her try to complete it. Hailey manages to make it to the end of the Big Bounce, where she sweats up a storm, but ultimately manages to complete it. She later learns that the older kids were not mocking her and were actually being helpful, and that her self-consciousness caused her to assume the worst about them. Hailey, Scot,t and their new friends then decide to do the Big Bounce together.
18	"Scott's on a Roll"	Cat Harman-Mitchell	Marty Donovan	Inbal Breda, Nicole Fridrich & Brad Goodchild	October 21, 2023 (Note: This episode was released a week early on October 14, 2023, on VOD.)	118	0.11
18	"Bye Bye Birdies"	Leslie Park	Lindsey Reckis	Nicole Fridrich & Kaden Westbrook	October 21, 2023	118	0.11
"Scott's on a Roll": A local restaurant has been offering to name a sandwich after anybody who buys 1,000 sandwiches from them, which is tracked on a punch card. Scott has had a long-standing wish to have a sandwich named after him and is close to reaching his goal, but Hailey has a list item calling for her to get a sandwich named after her, and she has only one punch on her card. However, they soon discover that local businessman Bill Board has recently acquired the restaurant and is no longer honoring the tradition. Instead, he is holding a contest where the last to remain on the restaurant's roof will get a sandwich named after them. Hailey, Scott, and A.C. are among the contestants and end up being the final three remaining. In the end, Hailey tricks A.C. into jumping off the roof with her, leaving Scott the winner. Scott then names a sandwich after Hailey and himself, fulfilling Hailey's list item while also fulfilling Scott's ambition. "Bye Bye Birdies": Hailey must tell the truth for an entire day to fulfill a list item. She finds this more difficult than expected, failing four days in a row. When she attempts to pass up on it again, she gets a brief flash of a destroyed future, forcing her to complete the list item. She manages to avoid even small white lies for most of the day, but then is expected to give a speech praising a businessman who has done many wrong things to secure his donation to the cause of saving a bird species. She proceeds to roast him instead, but fortunately, he finds it humorous and increases his donation.
19	"Frankly Fabulous"	Cat Harman-Mitchell	Written by : Lindsey Reckis; Story by : Lindsey Reckis & Kevin Yee	Ryan Agustin, Nicole Fridrich, Morgan Shandro & Kaden Westbrook	October 28, 2023 (Note: This episode was released a week early on October 21, 2023, on VOD.)	119	0.16
19	"The Pin is Mightier Than the Swole"	Leslie Park	Yolie Cortez & Mary Gulino	Brad Goodchild & Rhya Voskuil	October 28, 2023	119	0.16
"Frankly Fabulous": Hailey, Scott, and Beta discover that Frank can dance and decide to enter him into a bird show. Frank is reunited with a peacock named Petey, who is owned by Frank's original owner, Chuck Power, who considers Frank a failure. Hailey decides to prep Frank for the show, but begins to realize that she is turning into Chuck and tells him to be himself. Meanwhile, Scott tries to get a gift for his mother, but Becker keeps telling him that all the gifts he finds, she already has. While Frank does not win, he is still honored for his dance, and Petey sides with Hailey, humiliating Chuck. Scott decides to adopt Petey, thus getting a gift for his mother, and Hailey deduces that Frank and Petey are "more than friends". "The Pin is Mightier Than the Swole": Hailey's next list item is to lose against her father, Kai, at bowling. Her method is compromised when she learns that Kai plays with the guardrails. Hailey recruits Darryl, a brain-dead employee who is constantly failing, to train her to be bad at bowling. Meanwhile, Beta discovers a vending machine for stuffed bear making and uses it to give himself a buff body. Hailey begins to succeed at failing, but a Chaos Bot suddenly appears to ruin everything. Beta goes after it, losing his upgraded body in the process, but manages to destroy it. Hailey successfully loses, but Kai deduces that Hailey lost on purpose. He tells her that he is happy that she is a good bowler, which means that he has succeeded in some aspect.
20	"We Wish You a Merry Chaos-mas"	Howy Parkins	Devin Bunje & Nick Stanton	Ryan Agustin, Inbal Breda, Nicole Fridrich, Brad Goodchild, Lauren McKinley, Morgan Shandro, Rhya Voskuil & Kaden Westbrook	December 1, 2023	120	0.14
In 2074, the Professor and her team celebrate the 50th anniversary of Hailey's big Christmas celebration. In the present, Hailey is putting the finishing touches on the party, with Scott having invited Rudy, the Skateboarding Reindeer, who they learn is what makes the Christmas celebration a big success. The Professor arrives so that she can hide her team's access cards, which they use to time-travel. Unfortunately, she realizes she has no way of getting back, and her portal generator cannot function due to low power, requiring recharging. Hailey helps her, but Scott accidentally opens a portal, and Rudy goes through it. The group realizes that, due to Rudy's absence, Hailey throws the worst Christmas party, which results in people forgetting about the holiday in the future. The group struggles to save the day with various music acts until a Chaos Bot turns the power off. Hailey decides to sing a song, which gets everyone back into the spirit. The Professor is finally able to reopen a time portal, bringing Rudy back and saving Christmas before heading home.
21	"Mer-made in Oceanside"	Cat Harman-Mitchell	Yolie Cortez	Wickus Coetzee & Morgan Shandro	March 16, 2024	122	0.13
21	"Full House (of Bugs)"	Cat Harman-Mitchell	Marty Donovan	Ryan Agustin, Brad Goodchild, Todd Kurosawa & Morgan Shandro	March 16, 2024	122	0.13
"Mer-made in Oceanside": Oceanside opens up Mer-Fair, which celebrates the belief that a mermaid rescued a young boy many years ago. Since then, there have been possible sightings of a mermaid, with Hailey believing that she saw one when she was little. Beta reveals that her next list item involves seeing the mermaid again, despite him not believing it. A.C., in the meantime, is trying to make money off of glass stone, which he scoured before anyone else could get it. When Hailey mentions a necklace that the mermaid possesses, A.C. vows to steal the necklace and get the mermaid. While underwater, Hailey learns that the mermaid was, in fact, a statue, while Scott's bumbling causes A.C. to take a picture of him, believing he is a mermaid. Despite her disappointment, Hailey continues to instill the positive belief in everyone that mermaids exist, and A.C. is humiliated when people publicly share his photo (he wanted to make money from it). Afterwards, Hailey, Scott, and Beta see a real mermaid. "Full House (of Bugs)": When Becker accidentally infests her house with termites, the Denogas are forced to stay with the Banks family. Hailey and Scott are confident that they will have a fun time, while their parents will suffer. Beta goes through an update that causes him to suddenly play canned laughter during sitcom-style moments. After two days, the parents are enjoying their time together, while Hailey and Scott are starting to grow annoyed with each other. At the advice of Beta and Becker, Hailey and Scott urge the exterminator, Ms. Ohlson, to expedite the process. They spend the night with her, seemingly making things worse for the other. Hailey and Scott admit that they wanted to go back to living separately, and they apologize for not being honest with each other. However, their ploy ends up working as their parents sadly reveal that Ms. Ohlson is speeding up the extermination.
22	"The Umpire Strikes Back"	Leslie Park	Karen Graci	Inbal Breda & Kaden Westbrook	March 23, 2024	121	0.22
22	"Magician: Impossible"	Cat Harman-Mitchell	Karen Graci	Ryan Agustin, Nicole Fridrich, Brad Goodchild & Lauren McKinley	March 23, 2024	121	0.22
"The Umpire Strikes Back": Hailey's next list item is to catch a foul ball at a Barnacles game, which proves difficult for her as the Barnacles are notoriously bad. When Scott displays a powerful throwing prowess, the Barnacles manager recruits him, but only on the condition that Hailey join too. Due to Scott's inattentiveness, Hailey gives him a pair of her backup glasses so that he can focus on her bright catcher's mitt. The game goes well until Scott breaks his glasses, forcing Hailey to give him hers. The ball is hit into the foul, and Hailey manages to catch it, completing her list item. Despite the game still going on, Hailey and Scott decide to leave early. "Magician: Impossible": Hailey, Scott, and Beta attend the Magic Mansion to see Babs Cadabs. They learn that A.C. is there too, due to his parents having helped fund the facility. When Babs' magic tricks are being exposed online, Hailey steps in to help, though she is not very good at it. Scott, who had renounced magic after accidentally making a vending machine disappear, finally steps in and wows the crowd. Hailey figures out that A.C. has been taking photos and exposing the tricks via ceiling fans (his family owns a fan company). A.C. is thrown out, and Babs thanks Hailey and Scott for their help.
23	"Bad Bear Day"	Cat Harman-Mitchell	Lindsey Reckis	Nicole Fridrich & Lauren McKinley	March 30, 2024	123	0.18
23	"2001: A Spouse Odyssey"	Leslie Park	Kevin Yee	Wickus Coetzee, Nicole Fridrich, Todd Kurosawa & Rhya Voskuil	March 30, 2024	123	0.18
"Bad Bear Day": Hailey and Scott happen upon a tube of Honey Doo hair gel at a flea market, which was banned due to it attracting bears. It was also the same gel that attracted Hailey to Scott in the first place. Scott becomes popular with his new "do" and attracts the attention of The Rotunda, a club for students with great hair, who recruit him, believing that his hair is natural. Hailey wants in to complete a portion of her list, but Scott becomes so enthralled with the club that he neglects her. A bear that Chainsaw was transferring suddenly catches a whiff of the hair gel and heads towards the school. Realizing the danger he put himself in, Hailey pulls the fire alarm, washing the hair gel out of Scott, as well as the rest of the club members who also used the same gel. In the end, Scott apologizes for ditching Hailey, and Hailey completes the list item of getting into the Rotunda and being a "human candy bar" after falling into fondue. "2001: A Spouse Odyssey": Hailey learns that Kai and Patricia failed to mail their marriage certificate during their wedding, and thus are not legally wed. Having always wanted to give them a do-over wedding after hearing how the last one was a bust, Hailey sets her next item on the list to complete. The task turns out to be harder than she thought, as everything that can go wrong goes wrong, leading to a storm ruining everything. Hailey learns that despite the first wedding not being perfect, her parents loved it, and they still love this one as well. Hailey is able to complete the list item anyway, but Scott forgets the marriage license letter in the attic.
24	"The Saw-shank Redemption"	Leslie Park	Mary Gulino	Wickus Coetzee, Brad Goodchild, Todd Kurosawa & Lauren McKinley	April 6, 2024	124	0.12
24	"No More Mr. Rice Guy"	Cat Harman-Mitchell	Yolie Cortez	Inbal Breda & Morgan Shandro	April 6, 2024	124	0.12
"The Saw-shank Redemption": Hailey and Scott end up getting detention from the cruel Mr. Hardmeier, who is trying to meet his quota. Hailey and Scott have to go to the kite festival and win it for the next list item, but are sidetracked, thinking that A.C. was behind it. The two and the rest of the detentionees all believe that A.C. put them there to win the kite contest and make plans to escape. They manage to do so, but discover that A.C. was not behind their misfortune. Instead, Hardmeier himself was behind it so that he could win. Luckily, escapee Hacksaw arrives and helps the rest of the kids enter the contest, with Hailey winning. "No More Mr. Rice Guy": Kai starts to feel like he does not get respect for what he does around the house and goes on strike, refusing to cook. This hampers Hailey's plans, as she needed him to enter his fried rice for a school event so that she could earn enough money for the tinfoil museum, another item on her list. Hailey takes it upon herself to get the ingredients for the rice while Patricia takes care of the twins. Hailey learns that Kai helps people around Oceanside on a regular basis and finds that he does a great deal of hard work. The rice ends up going bad, and both Hailey and Patricia apologize for not being thankful to Kai. He, in turn, reveals that he made another batch of rice as he knew they would not get it right.
25	"When Squeeples Attack"	Leslie Park	Mary Gulino	Ryan Agustin, Inbal Breda, Nicole Fridrich, Rhya Voskuil & Kaden Westbrook	April 13, 2024	125	0.19
25	"Cool Intentions"	Cat Harman-Mitchell	Lindsey Reckis	Ryan Agustin & Brad Goodchild	April 13, 2024	125	0.19
"When Squeeples Attack": The Professor accidentally leaves her lab coat with Hailey and Scott, which just so happens to contain a small furry creature that the two decide to call a Squeeple. Despite Beta's warnings, Hailey and Scott decide to take care of it. However, the Squeeple proves to be tough to manage as it devours rubber and multiplies quickly. Hailey and Scott make makeshift capture equipment and locate the Squeeples to the drive-in movie theater. They successfully capture all the Squeeples just as the Professor returns to get her coat. She reveals that they are actually baby "Slaughterotharuses" and that had they stayed, they would have grown up and become man eating beasts. The Professor leaves with them as well. "Cool Intentions": After completing one of her list items, Hailey and Scott learn that they owe Becker $300. As collateral, she takes Beta, forcing the two to quickly find a job. They are hired by A.C.'s kind and caring mother Gretchen to help out at their store Fans+. A.C. in the meantime wants to be the lead in a Fans+ commercial, but the director doesn't find him convincing and has Hailey and Scott do it instead. Realizing how much this meant to him, Hailey gets A.C. to passionately open up about his opinion on fans and the director manages to catch it on film. The commercial airs and despite its admittingly low quality, satisfies A.C. Hailey and Scott get paid, but their checks are immediately taken by Becker.
26	"Out of Body Slam Experience"	Leslie Park	Marty Donovan	Inbal Breda, Nicole Fridrich, Rhya Voskuil & Kaden Westbrook	April 20, 2024	126	0.11
26	"Get Whale Soon"	Cat Harman-Mitchell	Kevin Yee	Nicole Fridrich & Lauren McKinley	April 20, 2024	126	0.11
"Out of Body Slam Experience": It's Beta's pre-birthday and Hailey got him a VIP pass to meet wrestler Rowdy Russ Stanton. In the meantime, Hailey tests her hypnosis on Scott to make him act like various animals. However, in order to de-hypnotize him, she needs to buy a separate volume which could take several days. They go to the show anyway where Scott unintentionally offends Rowdy Russ who challenges him to a match. Hailey uses the activation sounds to have Scott defeat Rowdy Russ, impressing even Beta. Afterwards, Hailey convinces Rowdy Russ to have a picture with Beta. "Get Whale Soon": Hailey's next list item is to save a whale. A baby whale just so happens to be in danger and Hailey, Scott, and Beta race to the beach, only to get sidetracked by Dave and Leo, their talkative next door neighbors, who have lost their dog Winston. Hailey continues to try various things to rescue the whale, but the situation either gets worse, or she gets distracted by Dave and Leo's constant neediness. Eventually, they discover that Winston is trapped on a rock on high tide and Hailey decides to rescue him over the whale. While she misses her chance, her list item is confirmed to be checked off due to the fact that Dave, Leo, and Winston's surname is Whale.
27	"How Kristine Goat Her Groove Back"	Cat Harman-Mitchell	Kevin Yee	Nicole Fridrich, Lauren McKinley & Morgan Shandro	April 27, 2024	127	0.14
27	"Oceanside's 11"	Leslie Park	Marty Donovan	Wickus Coetzee & Brad Goodchild	April 27, 2024	127	0.14
"How Kristine Goat Her Groove Back": Kristine wins Hat House, but immediately loses her fame. Hailey decides to cheer her up by taking her to a spa where Kristine undergoes a hallucination of a Yoga Goat telling her to find the thing that she "loves" most. She believes that it is Scott and races back to him, only to realize that she doesn't love Scott anymore. She renews her love for hats and tells Hailey that Scott needs someone in her life, implying that she knows of her crush. Hailey is happy that Scott is available now, but is now scared of asking him out. "Oceanside's 11": Hailey decides to fully promise asking Scott out by writing a notarized letter and saving it in her centaur romance novel. The novel accidentally ends up in the donation bin and Hailey and an oblivious Scott go looking for it. The book is bought by Blabby Abby, a gossip columnist who refuses to give it up. Hailey, Scott, and Beta manage to get it back, but Hailey finds that the note is not there. She returns home where Patricia reveals that she found it and that she should not be afraid of being open about her feelings to Scott.
28	"Student of the Weak"	Leslie Park	Lindsey Reckis	Inbal Breda, Nicole Fridrich & Rhya Voskuil	May 4, 2024	128	0.15
28	"Smother Knows Best"	Cat Harman-Mitchell	Yolie Cortez	Inbal Breda, Wickus Coetzee, Brad Goodchild & Morgan Shandro	May 4, 2024	128	0.15
"Student of the Weak": Hailey must get student of the week, a goal that is a hot-button issue for her because of supposedly perfect she is, yet fails to get time and time again. She is convinced that Vice Principal Bacon hates her, despite the fact that he is incredibly nice to everyone. She makes various attempts to mimic others such as Scott, Kristine, and Lucy, but fails to win every time. She finally snaps at Bacon in front of the assembly, until she learns the real reason she never wins: she forgot to turn in an overdue library book. She finally does win, but the students hate her. Bacon makes a grand speech about forgiveness and everyone applauds, though they still are mad at Hailey. "Smother Knows Best": Hailey and Scott must attend the running of the goats at the Cowpoke Corral in order to complete a list item. Meanwhile, ever since learning that Hailey has a crush on Scott, Patricia has been trying to "help" Hailey get together with him. She drives them to the corral, but she begins to force herself into Hailey and Scott's time, causing Hailey to finally snap at her for her intrusions. The goat running turns out to be with baby goats, but Beta unintentionally causes larger and angrier goats to chase them. Patricia rescues Hailey, with it being revealed that a baby goat crawled into her backpack, and Hailey and Patricia make up.
29	"The Biggest Luger"	Cat Harman-Mitchell	Mary Gulino	Ryan Agustin, Brad Goodchild, Morgan Shandro & Rhya Voskuil	May 11, 2024	129	0.13
29	"An Imposter is Born"	Leslie Park	Karen Graci	Inbal Breda, Wickus Coetzee, Nicole Fridrich & Kaden Westbrook	May 11, 2024	129	0.13
"The Biggest Luger": Scott is invited to join Ingebretsen Academy to be a part of their prestigious luge team as he is considered a "legacy". He discovers from his mother, Sunny, that his father, Eddie, was initially a luge champion who pushed her into becoming a restaurateur. Following an accident, he decided to become a medical professional, eventually leading to Sunny divorcing him. Hailey invites Eddie to come and train Scott for luge, which Sunny reluctantly allows. On the day of the tryout, Scott wipes out and angrily swears off luging. Sunny is relieved while Eddie admits that he is fine with Scott not wanting to luge. "An Imposter is Born": Hailey wants pop sensation Kelci Fyre to listen to her mixtape as part of her list item. Upon meeting her, Hailey and Kelci both realize that they look and sound the same. Wanting to get away from her controlling agent and mother, Jannica, as well as experience normal life, Kelci agrees to switch places with Hailey, with Hailey conditioning her to hear her track. Hailey learns very quickly that life as a pop star is hard work and she and Scott work to get Kelci back. Hailey convinces her to take control of her life and sing for herself. Kelci fires her mother and performs Hailey's song with her on a talk show.
30	"I Wanna Dance With My Buddy"	Howy Parkins	Devin Bunje & Nick Stanton	Ryan Agustin, Wickus Coetzee, Nicole Fridrich, Brad Goodchild, Lauren McKinley, Alexa Seidner, Morgan Shandro, Rhya Voskuil & Kaden Westbrook	May 18, 2024	130	0.12
Hailey's plan to ask Scott out to a school dance and confess her feelings for him is spoiled when a compatibility app called "SnackMatch" claims that they are incompatible with each other. Instead, according to the app, Scott is compatible with Destiny. However, during the dance, they don't go well together. After Kristine tells Scott he has been doing the survey incorrectly, Scott redoes the survey on the SnackMatch app, and he finds himself compatible with Hailey. Excited, he seeks to ask her out. However, Hailey has already asked out Sanjay Singh, the boyfriend she told him about previously. Beta reminds Hailey about her duties with the list, but she refuses to let the list, or Beta, be in control of her life. Hailey then quits her list, tears up her confession letter and throws it into the garbage. In a cliffhanger ending, a glimpse of the catastrophic future flashes in front of Scott as Beta finally tells him about the one list item that Hailey has been hiding from him this whole time, leaving him shocked.

== Shorts ==
=== Chibi Tiny Tales (2023–24) ===
A few months after its premiere, Hailey's On It! joined the Chibi Tiny Tales series.

No.	Title	Original release date
1	"Hailey's On the Disneyland Matterhorn"	November 11, 2023
2	"Beta in Love"	November 18, 2023
3	"Fortune Teller"	November 25, 2023
4	"Science Unfair"	February 17, 2024
5	"Chaos Bot Picnic"	May 18, 2024

=== Broken Karaoke (2023) ===
Part of the Broken Karaoke series that was started by Big City Greens.

No.	Title	Original release date
1	"Born to Be Strange"	July 29, 2023
2	"I Wear Them All"	October 24, 2023

=== Theme Song Takeover (2023–24) ===
As part of a promotional campaign, Disney Channel began airing the Disney Theme Song Takeover, wherein supporting characters from different shows performed the theme song to the series they were in.

No.	Title	Original release date
1	"Beta Theme Song Takeover"	August 19, 2023
2	"Scott's Theme Song Takeover"	February 10, 2024
3	"Hailey's Day Off"	May 11, 2024

=== Road Trip (2024) ===
A shorts series centered on Hailey, Scott, and Beta going on a road trip in the Professor's car to visit the clown museum. The shorts are a loose follow up to a similar series from Big City Greens.

No.	Title	Original release date
1	"Road Trip"	August 3, 2024
With Beta driving a car from the future, Hailey and Scott set out to accomplish one of Hailey's silliest tasks yet: visit the Giggleton clown museum!
2	"Moon Roof"	August 10, 2024
While Scott tries to figure out how to open the car's moon roof during a road trip, Hailey is worried Beta is about to drive them into a lake!
3	"Arrrchie's"	August 17, 2024
When Beta takes Hailey and Scott to a fast food drive-thru on their road trip, Beta is horrified to find out you can only order if you talk like a pirate!
4	"Robot Road Rage"	August 24, 2024
Beta reaches new levels of robot rage when he gets stuck in a traffic jam on their road trip.
5	"The Clown Museum"	August 31, 2024
After a long road trip, Hailey, Scott, and Beta have finally reached the Giggleton clown museum, but they're about to find out it's no laughing matter!

== Production ==
=== Development ===
The earliest concept for Hailey's On It! was conceived when Devin Bunje and Nick Stanton came up with a scenario of a girl failing to pay attention to a time-traveling messenger. The duo grew interested in the characters and slowly began to develop what would eventually grow into the series. The series was initially pitched under the title I Will NOT Kiss Scott Federman.

On November 18, 2021, Disney Branded Television announced that Hailey's On It! had been greenlit for a 20-episode first season. Meredith Roberts, a Disney Television Animation executive described the series as the first animated series by Bunje and Stanton, and called it a "fast-paced comedy" with "grounded stories" and "heart" which made it a "perfect fit" for Disney. The series was described as aimed at kids aged 6–14 and their families. On June 15, 2022, Disney Branded Television revealed that Hailey's On It! would be receiving 10 additional episodes, bringing the total from 20 episodes to a 30 episode count for the first season.

It was also announced that Howy Parkins would be a co-executive producer, alongside Bunje and Stanton, and supervising director. Reporting also confirmed Wade Wisinski as the show's producer, Karen Graci as the show's story editor, and Lee Ann Dufour as the series art director. In December 2022, the Daily Sundial reported that artist Jaison Wilson, who has worked on The Princess and the Frog, Milo Murphy's Law, Candace Against the Universe, and Amphibia, would be working on the series. On April 28, the show's first trailer was released, and a press release noted that the show's guest cast includes Brian Jordan Alvarez, Blake Anderson, Mick Foley, Jo Koy, Jack McBrayer, Bebe Neuwirth, Chris Parnell, Tim Robinson, Natasha Rothwell, Brandon Mychal Smith, Martin Starr, and Al Yankovic. The same day, it was announced that Cat Harman-Mitchell and Leslie Park would be series directors.

=== Writing ===
Writers for the series include Mary Gulino and Kevin Yee. Karen Graci serves as story editor. Bunje and Stanton said the use of animation gave them greater creative freedom than their live-action works. Due to the constant changes made to the show's story during development, the writers purposefully avoided having the content on Hailey's list to be fully defined, instead wanting the content to be conceived as they developed the story for each episode in order to allow greater creative freedom and flexibility.

The character of Beta was created because the writers wanted a way to "organize and prioritize list items" without always relying on the list itself, with the idea of a technologically advanced smartphone being conceived due to the dynamic such character could have with Hailey. Beta was originally meant to be a minor character, but his role was expanded after the writers enjoyed Gary Anthony Williams' performance and further developed him.

=== Cancellation ===
In October 2024, it was reported that the series would not be returning for a second season.

== Music ==
Hailey's On It! (Original Soundtrack)

Soundtrack album / EP by various artists
- Released: June 9, 2023
- Recorded: 2022–2023
- Genre: Soundtrack
- Length: 12:40
- Label: Walt Disney
- Producers: Matthew Tishler, Andrew Underberg

The series features K-pop, rock, pop-rock, electronic dance, and musical theater tracks. A digital soundtrack with six original songs was released on June 9 by Walt Disney Records. Matthew Tishler and Andrew Underberg are songwriters/composers for the series.

=== Track listing ===
All tracks are written by Andrew Underberg & Matthew Tishler except where indicated.

No.	Title	Writer(s)	Performer(s)	Length
1.	"Born For This"		Auliʻi Cravalho	2:47
2.	"I'll Never Lose You Baby"		Onestar	2:34
3.	"Kiss Your Friend"	Underberg, Devin Bunke, Tishler, Nick Stanton	Wade O. Brown	1:20
4.	"You Fit Me Perfectly"	Underberg, Kevin Yee, Tishler	Cravalho, Manny Jacinto	1:28
5.	"Dance (Da Da Da Da)"		Onestar	1:32
6.	"The Future's in My Hands - Theme from "Hailey's On It!""		Cravalho	2:58

== Broadcast ==
The series premiered simultaneously on Disney Channel and Disney XD on June 8, 2023, and then on Disney+ the following day. Several "Theme Song Takeover," "Broken Karaoke" and "Chibi Tiny Tales" shorts featuring characters from the series began airing in July. The series has a TV-Y7 parental guideline.

On September 27, 2024, the series was removed from Disney+.

== Reception ==
=== Critical response ===
The series was received well by critics. Rob Schwarz of Along Main Street said that Hailey's On It! is an effective show for families with children of nearly any age. Schwarz noted that their own children—ranging from three to eleven years old—each found something enjoyable in the show, appreciating Hailey's character for its empowering message, enjoying the series' humor and pranks, and finding the comedic AI phone sidekick, Beta, particularly entertaining. Schwarz concluded that Hailey's On It! demonstrates how children can overcome their fears, rely on their friends, and embrace new challenges. Matthew Aguilar of ComicBook.com described Hailey's On It! as a "delightful new comedy adventure series."

Tessa Smith of Mama's Geeky rated Hailey's On It! four out of five and said that the show is filled with fun and humor, describing scenarios as relatable, saying Hailey's experiences can resonate with viewers. Smith praised the series' ability to connect with its audience by addressing the pressures of meeting expectations, even if they seem trivial. They also highlighted that Hailey's On It! succeeds because it offers humor and situations that appeal to both children and adults. Smith stated that the animation, though familiar in style to other Disney series, is characterized for its quality. Ashley Moulton of Common Sense Media gave Hailey's On It! a grade of four out of five stars, praised the depiction of positive messages and role models, citing friendship and courage, while complimenting the educational value, writing, "Teen girl role model shines in funny action-adventure."

=== Accolades ===
The series won Outstanding Kids & Family Programming or Film - Animated at the 2024 GLAAD Media Awards.

== In other media ==
=== Video games ===
Following the show's premiere, DisneyNOW released updates for the games Bubble Burst and Color Splash related to the show.
