= Internal migration in Brazil =

Internal movement in Brazil

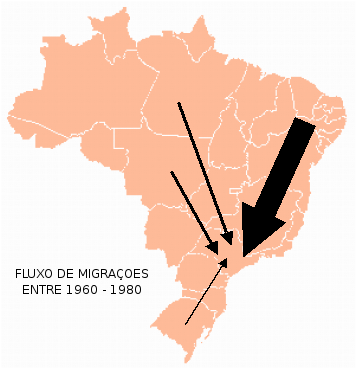
1960s to 1980s.

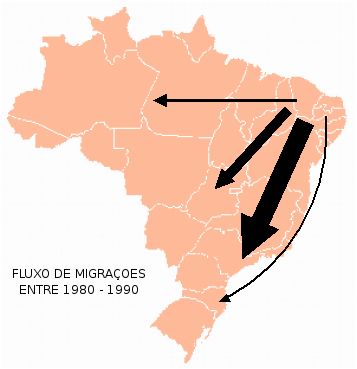
1980s to 1990s.

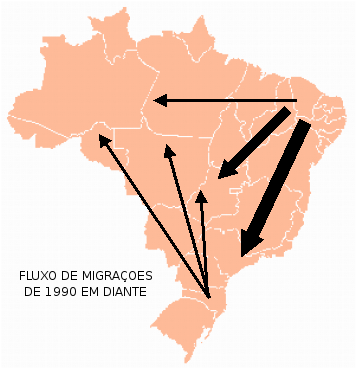
1990s.

Internal migration in Brazil occurs mainly for economic reasons and ecological disasters. Internal migration involves the movement of people within the same territory, which can be between regions, states or municipalities. It does not affect the total number of inhabitants in a country, but it does change the regions involved in this process. In Brazil, economic factors exert the greatest influence on migratory flows, as the capitalist production model creates privileged areas for industries, forcing people to move from one place to another in search of better living conditions and jobs to meet their basic survival needs.

Some examples of internal migration in Brazil occurred in the 1960s, when the droughts devastated the Northeast of Brazil, leading thousands of people to abandon their homes in the Brazilian hinterland due to the lack of agricultural alternatives and social policies in the region. At the end of the 19th century, northeasterners migrated to the North of Brazil because of the rubber cycle.

In the 1970s, migrants from the Northeast and the South left in search of a better life in the Southeast, Brazil's only industrial center at the time.

== History ==
Migration across Brazilian territory has been associated with economic factors since the time of colonization by Europeans. At the end of the 18th century, after the end of the sugar cane cycle in the Northeast and the beginning of the gold cycle in Minas Gerais and Goiás, there was a huge movement of people towards Brazil's new economic center. At the end of the 19th century, the rubber cycle attracted a large number of migrants to the Amazon region. At the time, the coffee cycle and the industrialization process made the Southeast a major attraction for migrants, who left their region in search of jobs or better salaries.

The process of large-scale rural exodus has intensified. In rural areas, misery and poverty, aggravated by the lack of infrastructure, the concentration of land and the mechanization of agricultural activities, lead the large rural population to be attracted by the prospect of an urban job to improve their standard of living. In addition, access to services and commerce in urban areas has become the main factor attracting people to the big cities.

Between the 1940s and 1990s, the cities had no supply of jobs to match demand and the urban economy expanded at the same rate as migration. As a result, unemployment and underemployment in the service sector grew due to the increase in the number of informal workers and street vendors. The lack of investment and planning in urban infrastructure contributed to the emergence of slums and urban invasions. Currently, the states of São Paulo and Rio de Janeiro register a greater outflow of population from the metropolises towards the medium-sized cities of the interior. Cities in the countryside, besides experiencing a period of economic growth, offer a better quality of life to the population.

From the 1970s onwards, the North and Central-West regions became the focus of internal migration, reflecting the March to the West policy that began in the 1940s, the incentives offered by jobs in the region and the construction of Brasilia in 1960. Today, the majority of migrations occur within the same region. In addition, some states, which traditionally had more emigration, have become regions of immigration, such as Pernambuco, Bahia, Ceará, Paraíba and Rio Grande do Norte.

== See also ==
- Brazilian northeastern migration
- Demographics of Brazil
