= Immigration Museum of the State of São Paulo =

Museum in Saõ Paulo, Brazil

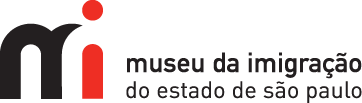

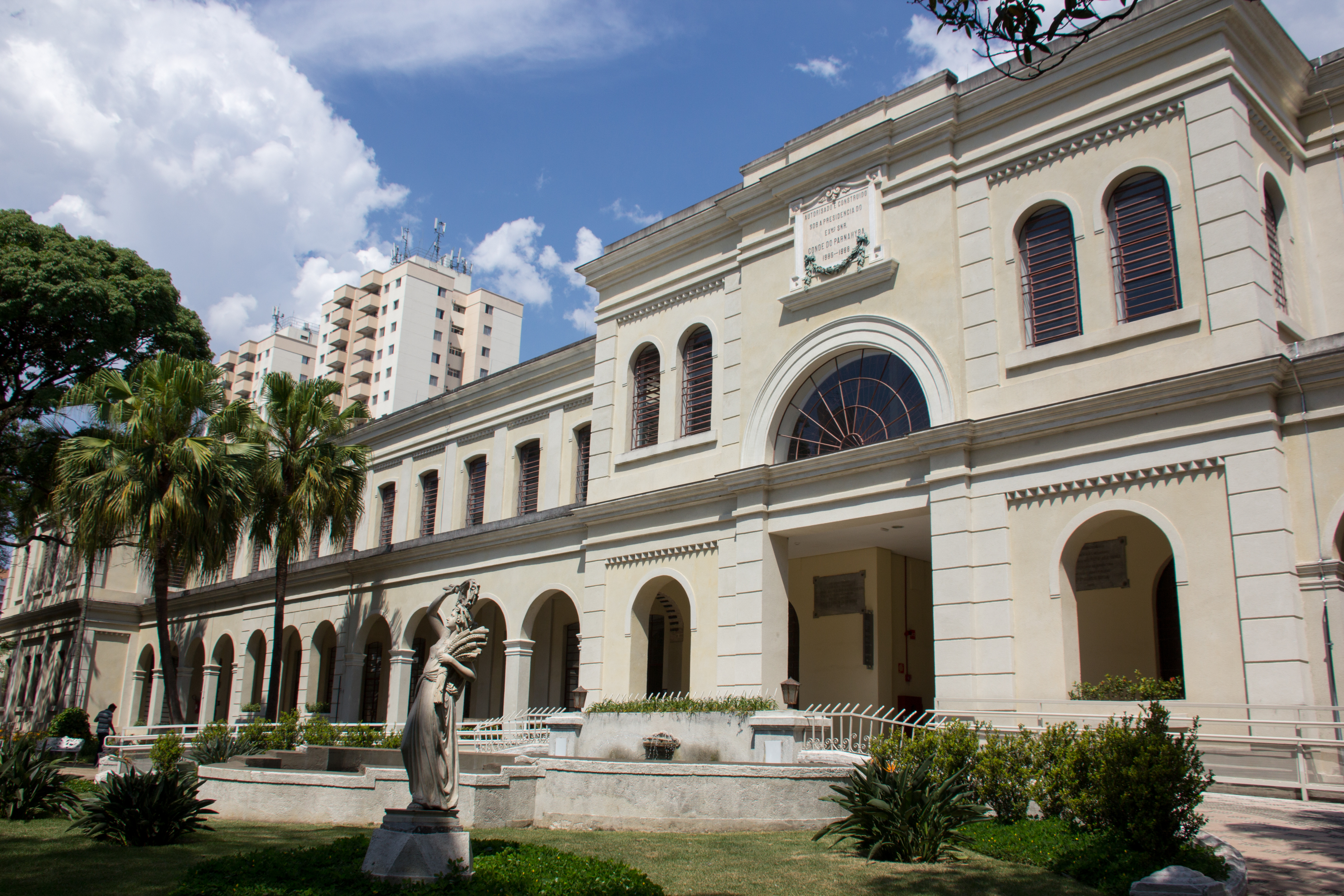
- The Immigration Museum in 2017
- Established: 25 June 1993
- Location: São Paulo, Brazil
- Coordinates: 23°32′57″S 46°36′47″W
- Visitors: 94,781 (2014)
- Website: museudaimigracao.org.br
- Location of Immigration Museum of the State of São Paulo

The Immigration Museum of the State of São Paulo (Brazilian Portuguese: Museu da Imigração do Estado de São Paulo) is a museum of immigration in the Mooca neighbourhood in east São Paulo, Brazil. It is located in the Immigrant Inn building, which opened in 1887.

The "Historical Center of Immigrants" was created in 1986. The Immigration Museum (Brazilian Portuguese: Museu da Imigração) was formally created on 25 June 1993 by an official decree by Luís Antônio Fleury Filho, managing the collection of the Historical Center. The first "Immigrant Fest" took place in 1996. The "Memorial of the Immigrant" was created in 1998, which was renamed the Immigration Museum in 2010. Renovations of the building started in 2010, which lasted 3.5 years and cost R$20 million. It reopened on 31 May 2014 as the Immigration Museum of the State of São Paulo.

Its exhibition areas include a wooden wall engraved with over 14,000 surnames, a long-term exhibition called Migrate: Experiences, Memories and Identities (Brazilian Portuguese: Migrar: Experiências, Memórias e Identidades), a reproduction of a dormitory and a dining room, and over 200 items such as furniture and suitcases, as well as temporary exhibitions. It also has a digital collection. The museum has over 12,000 items donated by immigrants, migrants and their descendants.

The museum is open from 9 a.m. to 5 p.m. on Tuesdays through Saturdays, and 10 a.m. to 5 p.m. on Sundays. Entrance is R$10, with free entrance on Saturday, and free late nights every other Friday (open until 8 p.m.). The museum also has a library (Brazilian Portuguese: Centro de Preservação Pesquisa e Referência), which is open Tuesday-Friday, 1 p.m. to 5 p.m.

== See also ==
- Brazilian northeastern migration
- Historical Museum of Japanese Immigration in Brazil
