= Immigrant Inn =

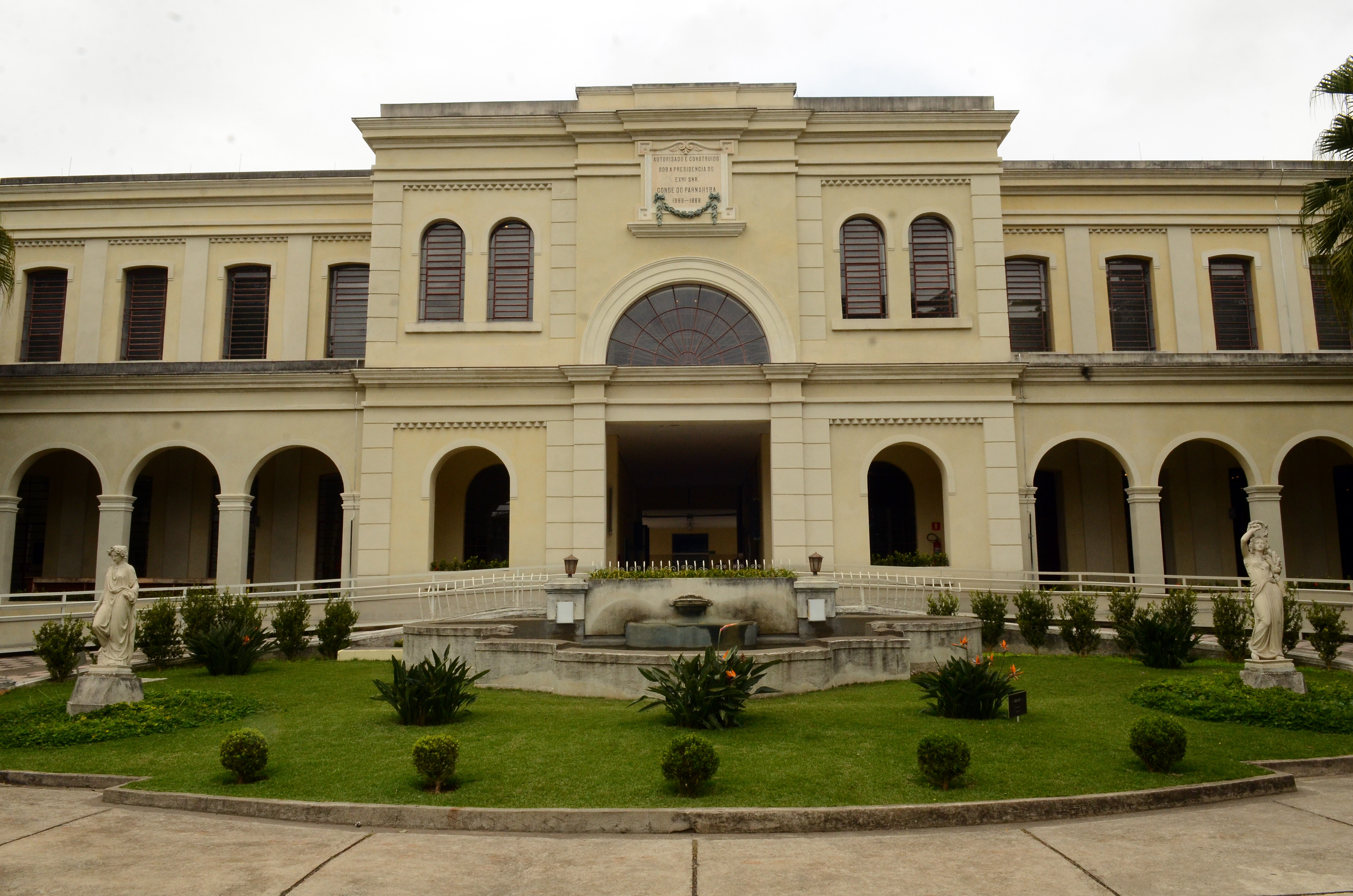

- Location within São Paulo Immigrant Inn (Brazil)

General information
- Coordinates: 23.5495°S 46.61278°W

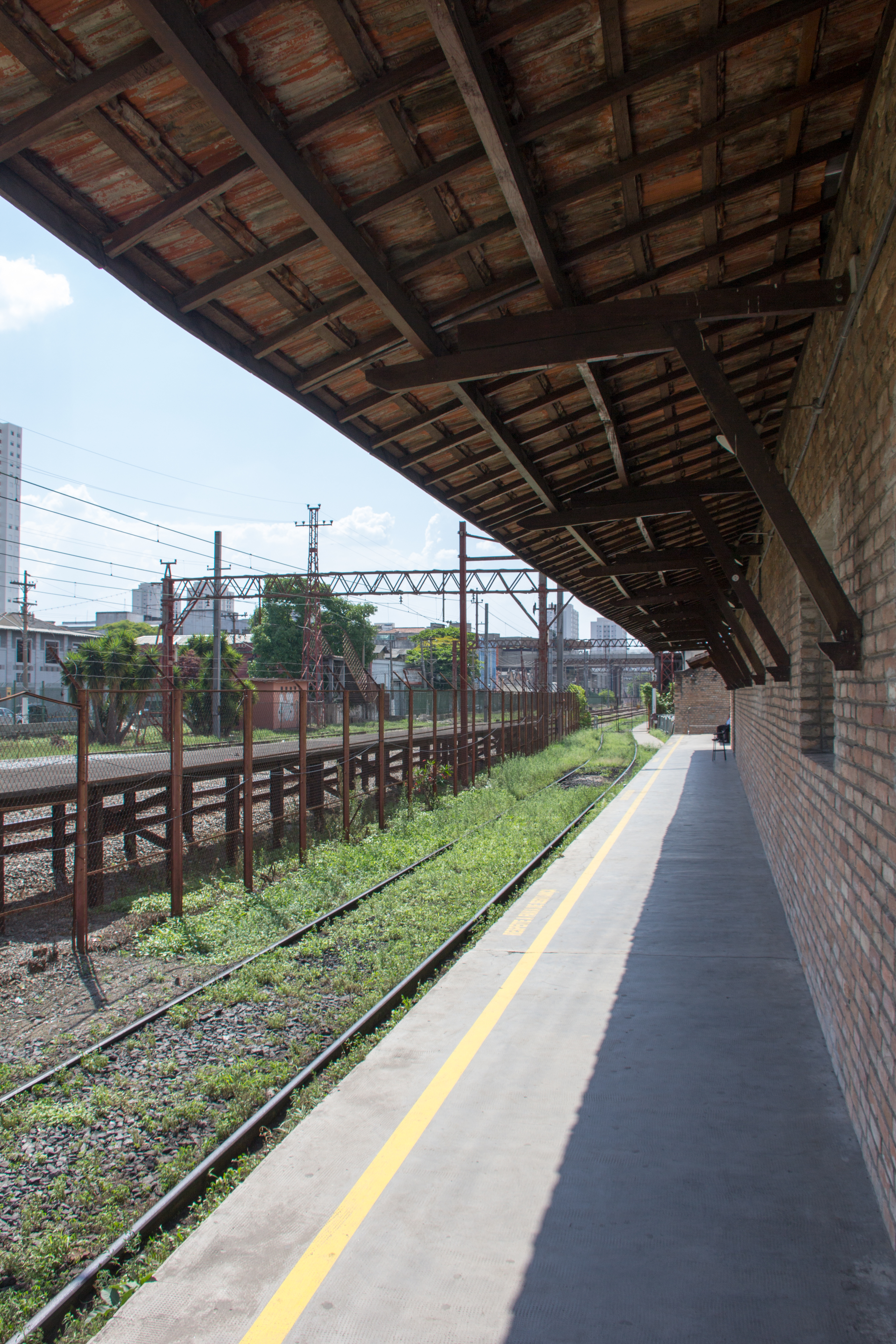
The railway station at the hostel

The Immigrant Inn (Brazilian Portuguese: Hospedaria dos Imigrantes) is a building in São Paulo. Construction started in 1886, and opened in 1887 (before completion), with the first group of immigrants arriving on 5 June 1887, before construction was completed in 1888. It was the main place for new immigrants to stay when arriving in the state of São Paulo at a time when coffee production in Brazil was being expanded and slavery in Brazil had been abolished. During the 19th and 20th century, people from over 70 nationalities arrived in Brazil, and over 2.5 million passed through the hostel.

It replaced a former hostel in the Bom Retiro district that was in poor condition and lacked basic sanitation. The new hostel was designed by Mateus Haüssler, and was built with piped gas, zinc baths, and iron water storage containers. It was constructed next to a railway line by which immigrants arrived.

It was managed by the Department of Agriculture, Trade and Public Works from 1892 until 1905, the Department of Lands, Colonisation and Immigration (DTCI) from 1905 until 1939, the Immigration and Colonization Service (SIC) from 1939 until its closure.

In 1924 it was used as a political prison during the Tenente revolts, and again in 1932 during the Constitutionalist Revolution. In the 1930s it started to host migrant workers from elsewhere in Brazil. It was renamed as the Department of Migrants in 1967/68. It received immigrants from Korea in 1978, shortly before closing that year after 91 years of operation.

It was renovated in 1936 and expanded in 1952, with refurbishment also in 1958. It was listed by Condephaat in 1982.

It now hosts the Immigration Museum of the State of São Paulo, and the part of the building that holds the museum was refurbished in 2010–2014.
