= Drift to the north =

Historical migration pattern within New Zealand

Drift to the north is a term used in New Zealand to refer to the internal migration of people from the South Island to the country's main metropolitan area, Auckland, in the North Island. The term is especially common in the cities of Christchurch and Dunedin, university cities whose graduates frequently head either to Auckland or the country's capital, Wellington, which is also in the North Island, after they complete their studies.

Historically, the South Island's population has accounted for an increasingly small proportion of the country's population. In the late 19th century, especially after the Otago gold rush, the majority of the country's population was in the South Island. Since then, the South's population has climbed more slowly than the North's, with the latter increasing at a greater rate at least in part from the influx of migrants from the Pacific Islands, for many of whom Auckland is a port of entry. The South Island now accounts for only 24% of the country's population. The use of the term "drift to the north" for that phenomenon dates from at least 1916 and possibly much earlier.

Recent censuses have shown a slowing of the rate of drift, with increasing numbers of North Islanders heading to the South Island's popular scenic regions such as Central Otago.
