= Brazilian northeastern migration =

Domestic migration in Brazil

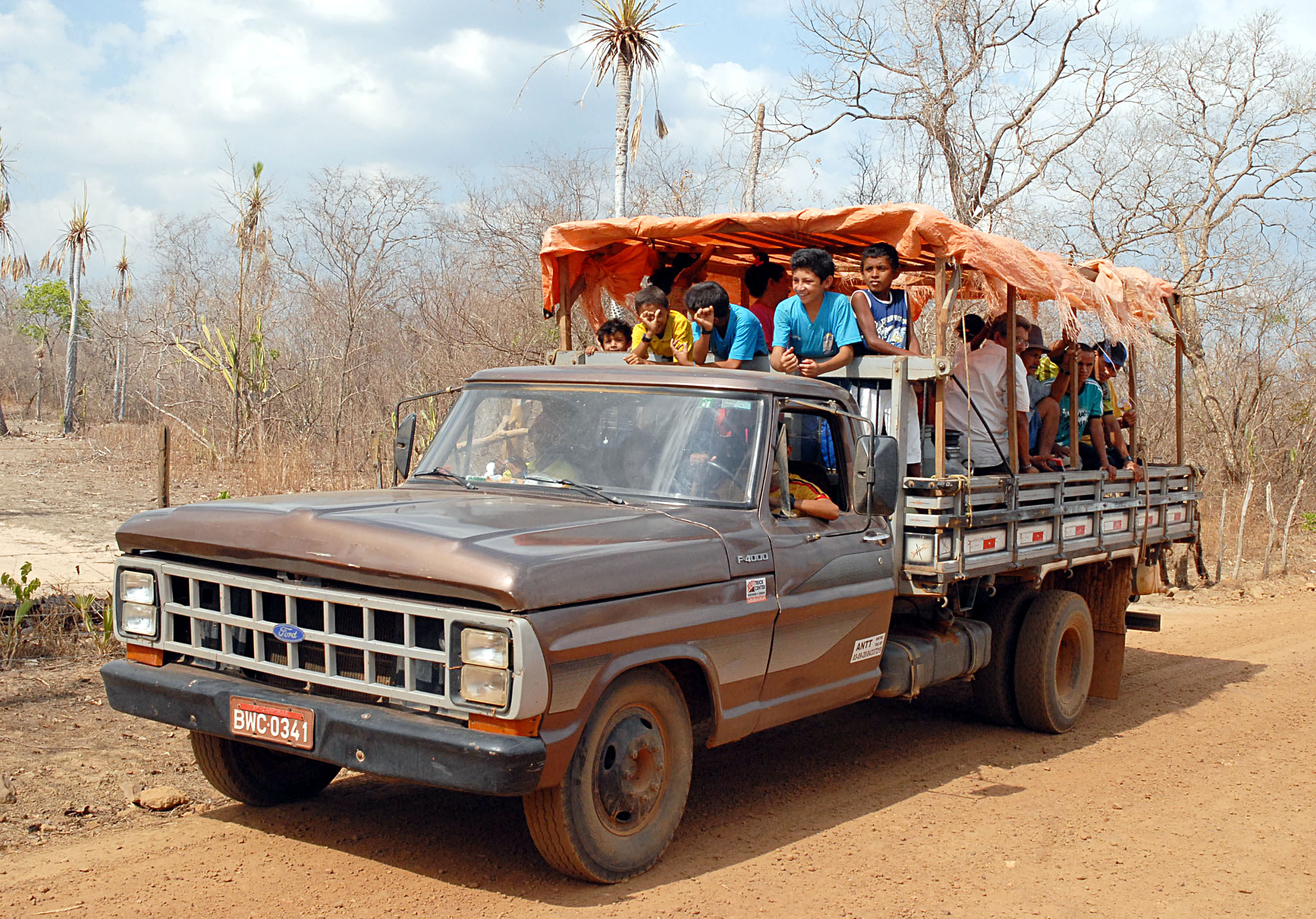
Scene from the interior of Northeastern Brazil. Here, residents of the municipality of Caraúbas do Piauí are transported in a pau de arara style truck.

Northeastern migration or the northeastern exodus refers to a secular migratory process of populations coming from the Northeast region of Brazil to other parts of the country, in particular to the center-south. This migratory movement had and has great relevance in the history of migration in Brazil since the time of the Empire.

Economic stagnation and constant droughts, in contrast to the economic prosperity of other regions in Brazil, were determining factors in the beginning of the northeastern migratory process. In 1879, with the advent of the First Rubber Cycle, the northeasterners migrated to the Amazon region, a fact that is repeated during the World War II, with the Second Rubber Cycle. During the peak of Brazil's industrialization, between the 1950s and 1970s, migration from the Northeast to the Southeast, especially to the states of São Paulo and Rio de Janeiro, was intense, making the capitals of these states great poles of attraction for these populations.

After the decline of the industrial growth in the Southeast, at the end of the 1980s, migration from the Northeast to São Paulo and Rio de Janeiro decreased considerably. Between the 1980s and 1990s, polynucleated migration became more evident, also registering migrations to the Federal District region and, once again, to the Amazon region.

== Causes ==
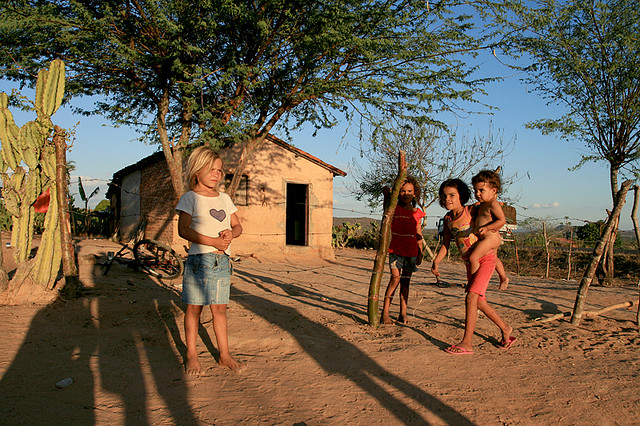
In the Northeastern sertão, there are still victims of the constant droughts. The states with the highest concentration of extreme poverty are Maranhão, Alagoas, and Piauí.

The strong process of economic development, driven mainly by the industrialization of the 1930-1980 period, especially in São Paulo, due to the accumulation of coffee since the 19th century and the import substitution and protectionist policies, favored the Southeast region of Brazil. In contrast, the Northeast region still maintained old characteristics: backward and poorly diversified agriculture, a stagnant economy, large landowners, concentration of income, and a poorly diversified industry with low productivity. besides the natural phenomenon of constant droughts. The distinct characteristics of these two regions, besides accentuating regional inequalities, formed a propitious scenario for migration from the Northeast, especially to urban areas.

Another factor that contributed to the increase in the northeastern migratory flow in this period was the construction of Brasília, in the Central-West, which attracted large population groups to work on the construction sites of the then new federal capital of Brazil.

== Migration flows ==
Position	Federative Unit	Northeast-born population (2010)
1	São Paulo	4.628.959
2	Rio de Janeiro	1.149.692
3	Pará	724.901
4	Goiás	676.064
5	Federal District	602.104
6	Minas Gerais	384.659
7	Tocantins	228.941
8	Mato Grosso	204.422
9	Paraná	200.074
10	Espírito Santo	197.558
11	Rondônia	122.335
12	Mato Grosso do Sul	108.556
13	Roraima	91.029
14	Amazonas	87.846
15	Santa Catarina	59.273
16	Amapá	38.854
17	Rio Grande do Sul	30.634
18	Acre	12.958

=== Amazon ===
In 1877, the Brazilian Northeast was suffering from the consequences of the drought. Many northeasterners, mostly from Ceará, were encouraged to migrate to the Amazon to work in latex extraction. This destination was also popular during the drought of 1915, as Rachel de Queiroz wrote in her novel O Quinze.

The migration to the so-called Terra da Fartura (English: Land of Plenty) was always stimulated with the support of the Northeastern state governments. However, with the Washington Accords signed by Getúlio Vargas in 1943, the migration began to be organized by the Federal Government. The agency responsible for this movement was Special Service of Mobilization of Workers for the Amazon (SEMTA). It is estimated that over 60,000 people migrated to the Amazon region to work as Rubber Soldiers.

=== South-Central ===
==== São Paulo ====
The migration from the Northeast to the state of São Paulo can be divided into two intense flows: a rural one, which comprises the decades from 1930 to 1950, and an urban one, which embraces the decade from 1950 to the present day. From the 1930s on, the massive flow of European immigrants to São Paulo decreased. At the same time, the government took on a nationalistic tone and a relocation of people from the Northeast, where there was economic crisis, population surplus and scarcity of resources, to the center-south, where the situation was reversed, began.

Similar to what happened with the European immigrants at the beginning of the century, the first migration flow from the north of Minas Gerais and the Northeast to São Paulo is related to the arrival of workers for farms that produced mainly cotton, coffee and, to a lesser extent, sugarcane. The work was related to the production of these agricultural crops and also to the opening of forests connected with the appearance of new farms and the preparation of the land for planting or for livestock.

However, from 1951 on, the northeastern migratory flux changed its route, leaving the interior of São Paulo and heading for the metropolitan region of the São Paulo capital. In the post-war period, encouraged by the industrialization policy and the 2/3 Law, which established a minimum quota of national workers, the migration from the Northeast became essentially urban. It provided the labor necessary for Brazil's urban and industrial development, constituting a mass of reserve workers, which made it possible to keep labor costs low.

After 1980, there was also a migration to rural areas, mainly to the Ribeirão Preto and Franca region, related to the intensification of sugar cane planting stimulated by the Pro-Alcohol policy. This migration is considered temporary, because it depends on the cycle of the sugarcane harvest. The workers come at the beginning of the harvest, live in the cities near the sugar and ethanol mills, but return to their hometown as soon as the harvest ends.

Internal migration in Brazil had two flows, from 1935 to 1939 and from 1939 to 1950. The creation of the Inspectorate of Migrant Workers (ITM) and the events of the Estado Novo marked the division of this period. The main change was the agencying of workers by the State and the decrease of private worker migration agencies. According to reports from the Secretary of Agriculture of the State of São Paulo, between 1935 and 1939, migration agencies had a preference for families consisting of three able-bodied workers between the ages of 12 and 55. However, there were other clauses that allowed the migration of other relatives and aggregates, regardless of sex, age or marital status; the independent worker could also migrate. The migrant able to work in the fields as a relative, aggregate or freelance received 25,000 réis, while families received 60,000 réis.

According to data from the Secretary of Agriculture of São Paulo, in 1937, 72,144 northeasterners visited the Immigrants' Hospedaria. Of these, 1,379 were called by migration agencies and 10,639 were enrolled in the Hospedaria as spontaneous migrants. The industrialization of the 1930s with the Estado Novo policies and later the developmental policies concentrated the industrial development in a single pole, the state of São Paulo. The government subsidy for migrants and the industrial economic concentration were important for the increase in the number of spontaneous workers who, through social networks, either family members or acquaintances, came to the state of São Paulo. However, from 1935 to 1939, the Secretary of Agriculture distributed migrants to the interior of the state, but after 1939, many migrants were destined for the capital, and later there was a more intense migration of residents from the interior of the state to the capital, São Paulo.

==== Rio de Janeiro ====
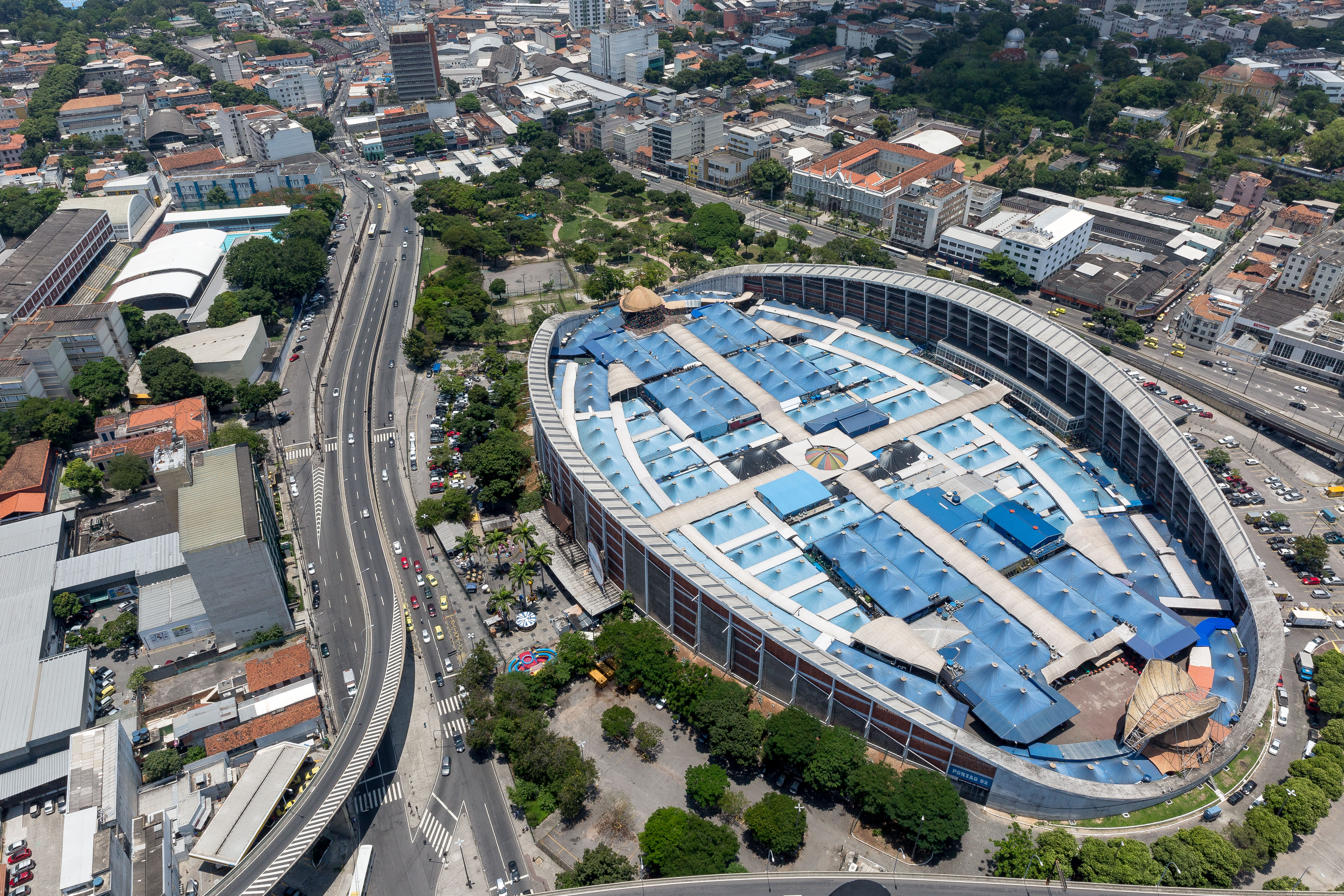
Aerial photograph of the Luiz Gonzaga Center of Northeastern Traditions, in Rio de Janeiro.

The migration from the Northeast to the state of Rio de Janeiro was concentrated in the metropolitan region of Rio de Janeiro, and happened constantly from the 1950s on. At the climax of industrialization, between the 1960s and 1980s, they began to migrate to the Southeast in search of better living and working conditions. Due to the structural improvement of other regions of the country, and the problems resulting from overpopulation in the big cities, migration from the Northeast region has decreased considerably. Although Rio de Janeiro and São Paulo continue to be important poles of attraction, the polynucleated migration has gained more accentuated contours.

=== Current Trends ===
In recent years, the traditional movement of migration from the Northeast region has been reduced and eventually reversed. According to the study Nova geoeconomia do emprego no Brasil (English: New Geo-economics of Employment in Brazil), by the University of Campinas, the states of Ceará, Paraíba, Sergipe, and Rio Grande do Norte received more migrants between 1999 and 2004 than they sent to other regions. The state of Paraíba, according to the same research, was the most radical example of the transformation: it inverted the migration pattern from the negative balance of 61 thousand people to the positive balance of 45 thousand. In all the other states that continue to have a negative migration balance, the number of migrants decreased in the same period analyzed: in Maranhão, it decreased from 173,000 to 77,000; in Pernambuco, from 115,000 to 24,000; and in Bahia, from 267,000 to 84,000.

According to data from the National Household Sample Survey (Pnad) of 2009, released by the IBGE, Pernambuco was the northeastern state with the highest rate of return of migrants, followed by Rio Grande do Norte and Paraíba. Some specialists indicate that the migratory flow had a substantial reduction due to the federal government's investments in the region, which went from supplying labor to employing it.

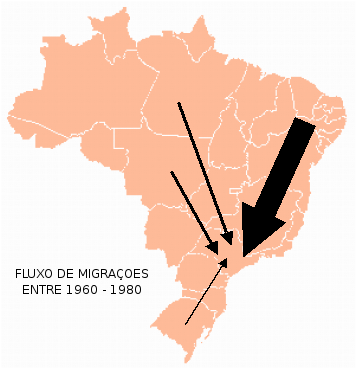
1960s to 1980s.

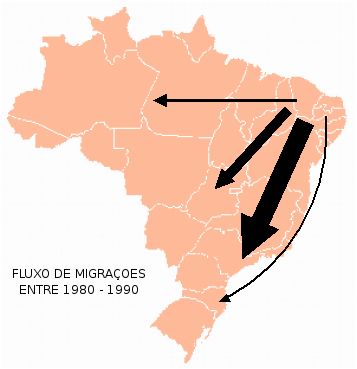
1980s to 1990s.

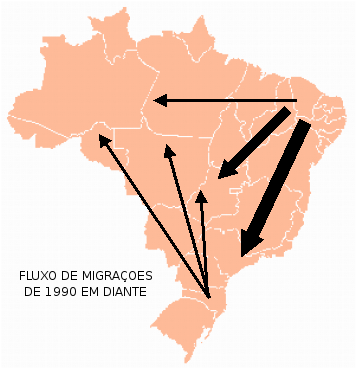
From the 1990s on.

== Discrimination ==
Racial and social prejudice accompanied the migration of the northeasterners to the center-south of the country. Due to their original material poverty and the unfavorable conditions found at their destination, Northeastern migrants were left to occupy the poor areas and the outskirts of urban centers. From the 1950s on, the lack of housing and expensive rents forced migrants to occupy peripheral areas, where they bought plots of land and built their houses with their own resources.

The northeasterners who arrived in the post-war period found a much less favorable environment for social ascension than the European immigrants who arrived in São Paulo at the beginning of the 20th century. When northeastern migration increased, the frontiers of industrial society were already properly marked and the opportunities for mobility were already more restricted. The European immigrants in São Paulo had already occupied the skilled and semi-skilled positions of the jobs, leaving the northeasterners with the subordinate and unskilled professions.

From the racial point of view, most of the arriving migrants from the Northeast were mulattos or mestizos, of short stature, poor and illiterate or semi illiterate. In a country like Brazil where, to this day, the white European standard is the most valued, the massive presence of poor and mixed-race northeasterners in São Paulo makes this group be perceived as responsible for poverty, violence, unemployment, and the degradation of living conditions in the city.

Sociologist Antônio Sérgio Guimarães compares the anti-northeastern racism in São Paulo to the xenophobia against immigrants that currently exists in Europe. In his research in lower-middle-class neighborhoods of traditional European immigration in São Paulo, the sociologist came across how naturally the "natives", many of them of European descent, expressed their prejudice against northeasterners, who are invariably called "baianos", even if they are from other states in the Northeast.

A case of law student Mayara Petruso has gained repercussion in the Brazilian media. In 2010, after the election of Dilma Rousseff as president, who obtained a majority of votes in the Northeast, Petruso posted the following message on a social network: "Northeasterners are not people. Do São Paulo a favor: kill a northeasterner by drowning". She was sentenced by the São Paulo Federal Court to one year, 5 months, and 15 days in prison, which was converted into community service and payment of a fine.

== See also ==
- Demographics of Brazil
- Northeast Region of Brazil
- Amazon rubber cycle
