= Hawaiian diaspora =

Regions with significant populations
- United States (mainland): 213,107
- Canada: 3,295

Languages
- English, Hawaiian Pidgin, Hawaiian

Religion
- Christianity, Hawaiian religion

Related ethnic groups
- Native Hawaiians, Polynesians

The Hawaiian diaspora or Native Hawaiian diaspora (Hawaiian: Kānaka maoli i nā ʻāina ʻē) are people of full or partial Hawaiian descent living outside of Hawaii. The vast majority of them live in the contiguous United States, though smaller communities are present elsewhere.

== History ==
=== Canada ===
Between the 18th and 19th centuries, thousands of Native Hawaiians were recruited by North American labor companies, many of which were in British Columbia, Canada's westernmost province. Common occupations among Hawaiian migrants included fur trapping and sailing. These laborers were referred to as kanakas, a term derived from the Hawaiian word "kanaka" (human).

Canada's first wave of Hawaiian workers arrived in 1811, with a total of 24 laborers on board. In subsequent years, further immigration continued from the Hawaiian Islands. Initially, most Hawaiians worked in the fur industry. Later on, many of them worked in other fields such as blacksmithing and carpentry.

Hawaiian laborers were highly sought after due to their skilled qualities. In 1829, the Hudson's Bay Company (HBC) opened up an agency in Honolulu to hire more contract workers. By the year 1844, between 200 and 300 Hawaiians were employed by the HBC, with an additional 50 working as sailors.

=== United States ===
Similar to Canada, the United States also received an influx of Hawaiian laborers on its west coast, with continued immigration due to events such as the California Gold Rush.

In recent decades, thousands of Hawaiians have moved to the US mainland, with the primary factor being Hawaii's high cost of living. As a result of this exodus, nearly 50% of all Native Hawaiians live outside of Hawaii. California hosts the largest Hawaiian diaspora community, followed by Washington and Nevada.

In the 2020 US census, Clark County, Nevada (which includes the city of Las Vegas) was the US county home to the most Native Hawaiians outside of Hawaii. Nearly 22,000 people of Native Hawaiian and Pacific Islander descent lived in Clark County in 2021, an increase of 40 percent from 2011. Las Vegas is sometimes called "the Ninth Island" in reference to the eight islands of Hawaii. Casino owner and entrepreneur Sam Boyd is credited for first fostering the Las Vegas–Hawaii relationship in the mid-1970s by advertising package deals to Hawaiian tourists at his California Hotel and Casino.

== See also ==
- Native Hawaiians
- Hawaii
- Diaspora
