= Batalha Municipality =

Batalha Municipality may refer to:

- Batalha Municipality, Portugal
- Batalha, Alagoas, municipality in Alagoas, Brazil
- Batalha, Piauí, municipality in Piauí, Brazil
