= Barsa (encyclopedia) =

Brazilian encyclopedia

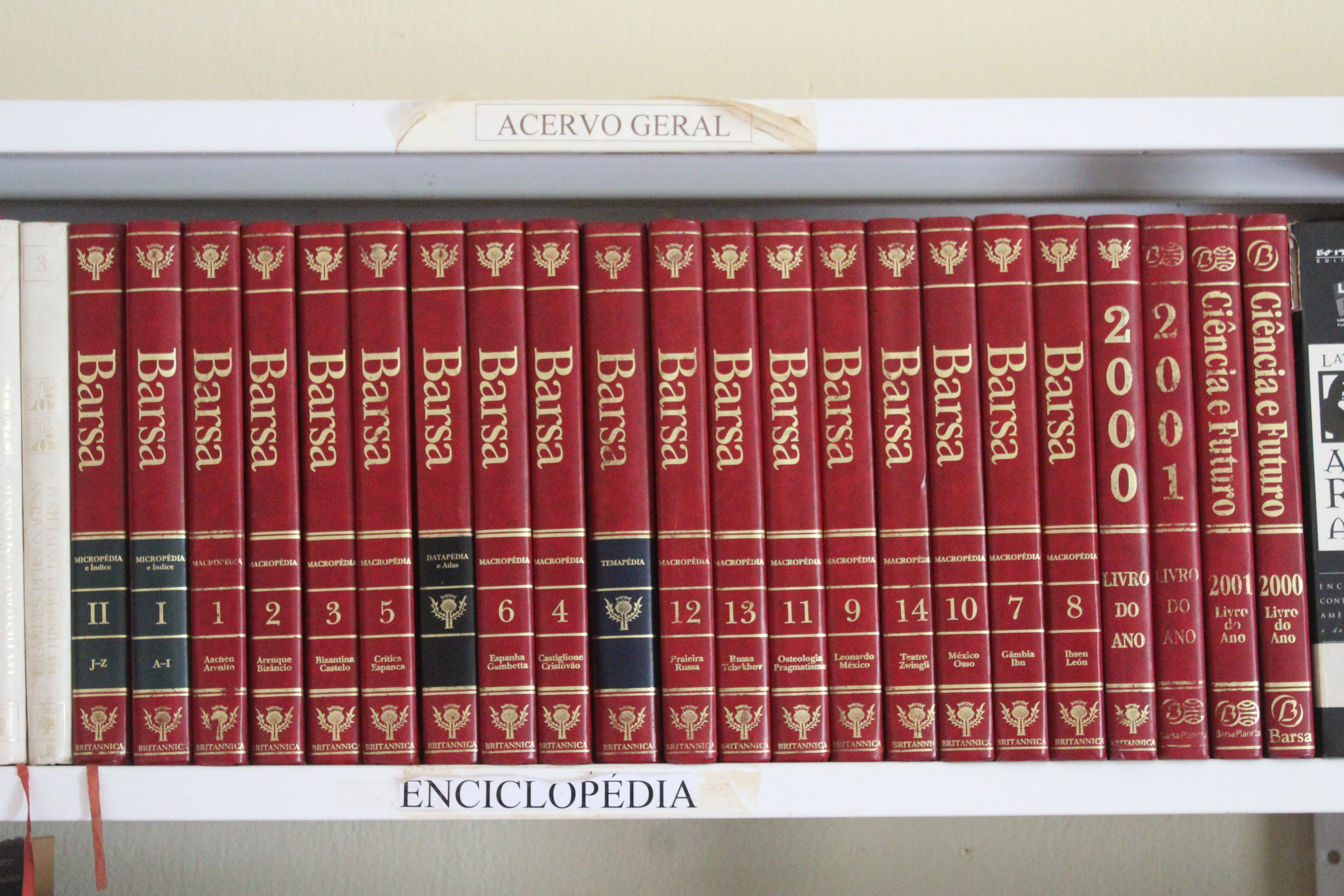
A Barsa encyclopedia set in a library in Juazeiro do Piauí, Brazil

Barsa is a Brazilian encyclopedia, first published in 1964. It was later translated into Spanish and sold across much of Latin America. It is widely known in Brazil, Argentina, Chile, Venezuela and Mexico. It has printed versions in Portuguese and Spanish with nine volumes each and 2,842 pages. Barsa also has a multimedia version.

Conceived in 1959, by Dorita Barrett, daughter of an American Encyclopedia Britannica executive, Barsa was the first Brazilian encyclopedia developed by a Brazilian editorial board formed, among other people, by the encyclopedist and translator Antonio Houaiss, the writer Jorge Amado, the architect Oscar Niemeyer, and the journalist and writer Antônio Callado as the chief editor of the first edition.

The name Barsa is a combination of the surnames of the couple Dorita Barrett (Bar) and her husband, the then Brazilian diplomat, Alfredo de Almeida Sá (Sa). Until then, the Brazilian market could only find encyclopedias in English, German or French. Dorita, living in Brazil, refused the idea of promoting a translation into Portuguese of the original Encyclopedia Britannica. Barsa's first edition was launched in March 1964. The initial batch, of 45 thousand copies, sold out in 8 months.

Barsa encyclopedia operations were bought by Editorial Planeta in 2000.
