= Fronteira =

Fronteira may refer to the following places:

== Brazil ==
- Fronteira, Minas Gerais
- Fronteira dos Vales, Minas Gerais
- São João da Fronteira Piauí
- Três Fronteiras, São Paulo

== Portugal ==
- Fronteira, Portugal, a municipality in Portalegre District
- Fronteira (parish), a parish in Portalegre District

== See also ==
- Fronteiras
