= São José do Divino =

São José do Divino may refer to the following places in Brazil:

- São José do Divino, Minas Gerais
- São José do Divino, Piauí
