= Caraúbas do Piauí =

Coordinates: 3.47583°S 41.8428°W

- Municipality
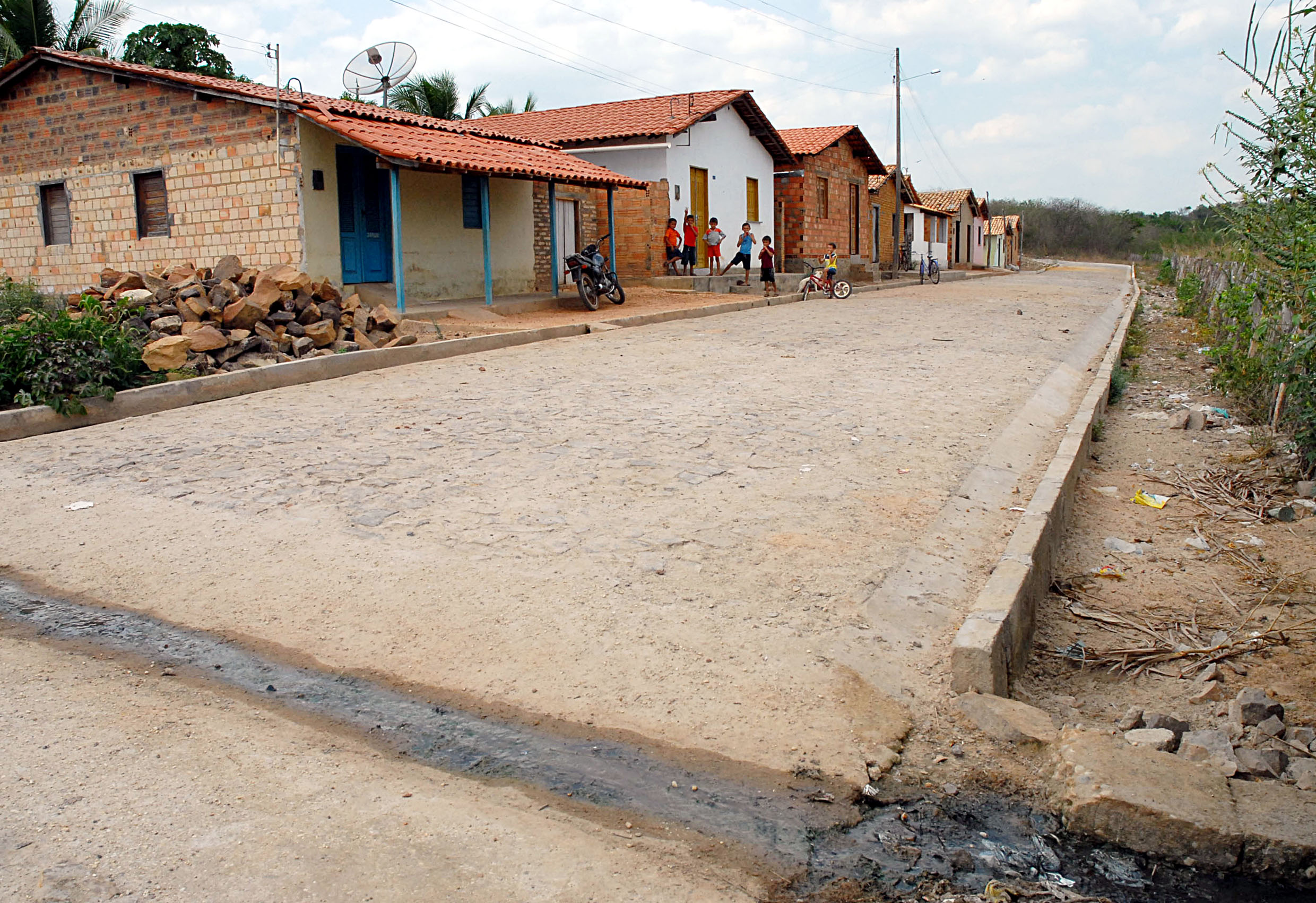

- Country: Brazil
- Region: Nordeste
- State: Piauí
- Mesoregion: Norte Piauiense

Population (2020)
  - Total: 5,890
- Time zone: UTC−3 (BRT)

Caraúbas do Piauí is a municipality in the state of Piauí in the Northeast region of Brazil.

The municipality contains part of the 1,592,550-hectare (3,935,300-acre) Serra da Ibiapaba Environmental Protection Area, created in 1996.

== See also ==
- List of municipalities in Piauí
