= Sete Cidades National Park =

National park in Piauí, Brazil

- Parque Nacional de Sete Cidades
- IUCN category II (national park)
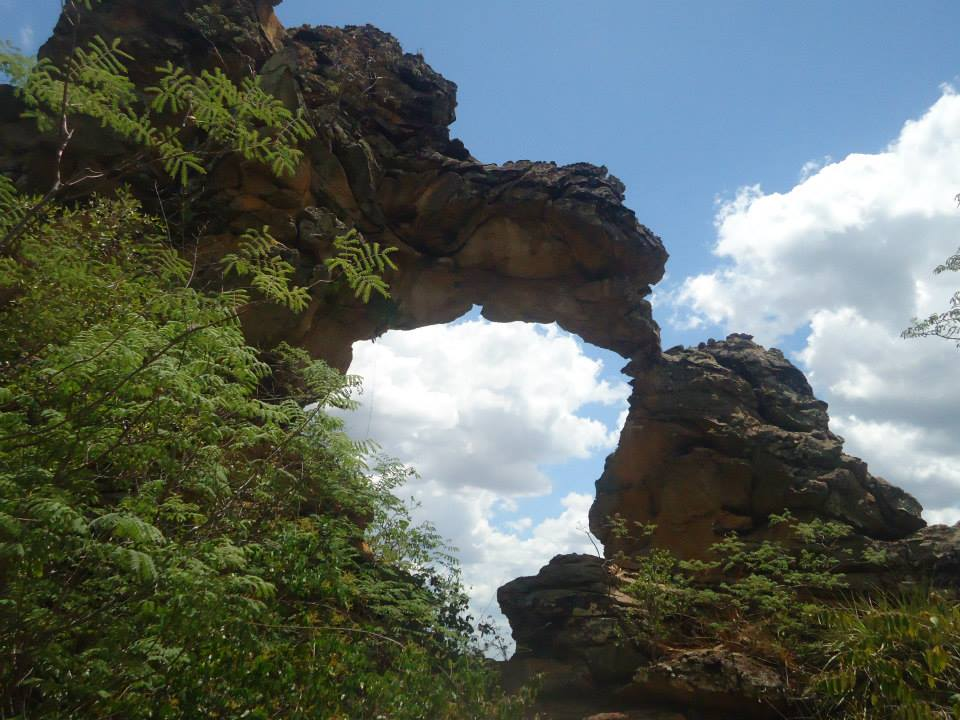
- Sete Cidades National Park

- Location within Brazil
- Nearest city: Piracuruca, Piauí
- Coordinates: 4°05′56″S 41°42′43″W
- Area: 7,700 ha (30 sq mi)
- Designation: National park
- Created: 8 June 1961
- Administrator: ICMBio

Sete Cidades National Park (Portuguese: Parque Nacional de Sete Cidades) is a national park in the state of Piauí, Brazil.

== Location ==
The Sete Cidades National Park is divided between the municipalities of Brasileira (26.21%) and Piracuruca (73.77%) in the state of Piauí. It has an area of 7,700 hectares (19,000 acres). The park is surrounded by the 1,592,550 hectares (3,935,300 acres) Serra da Ibiapaba Environmental Protection Area, created in 1996.

== History ==
The Sete Cidades National Park was created by decree 50.744 of 8 June 1961 by Jânio Quadros, president of Brazil. The management plan was published, but not officially formalized, on 31 December 1978. Ordnance 126 of 14 December 2010 created the consultative council.

== Environment ==
The park contains arid savanna forest (babassu forests] and areas of contact between savanna, arid savanna, and seasonal forest. It protects an important geological formation and conserves water resources in a dry region. The geological monuments are the main attraction. The park also has some pre-historic cave paintings and inscriptions.

== Gallery ==
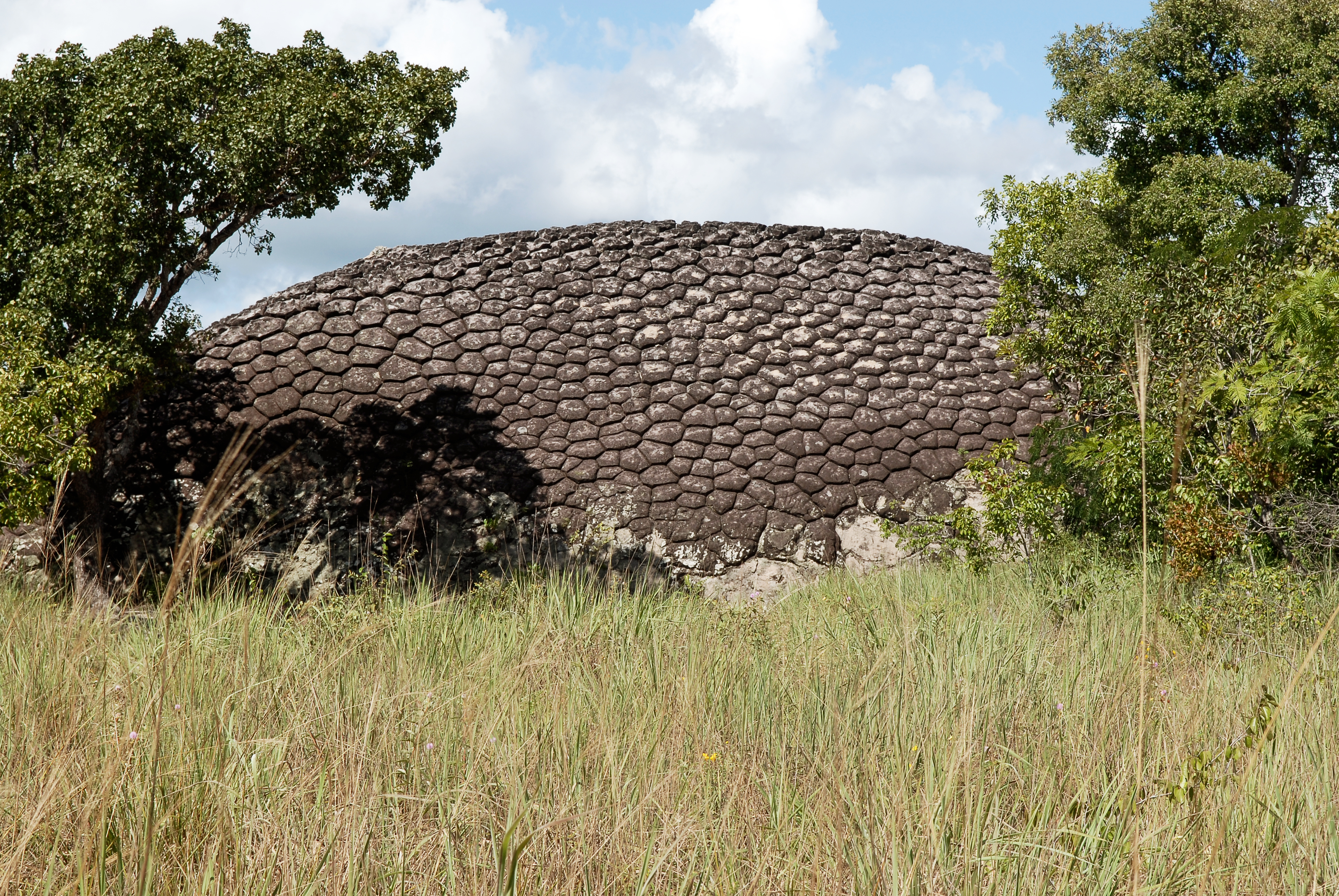

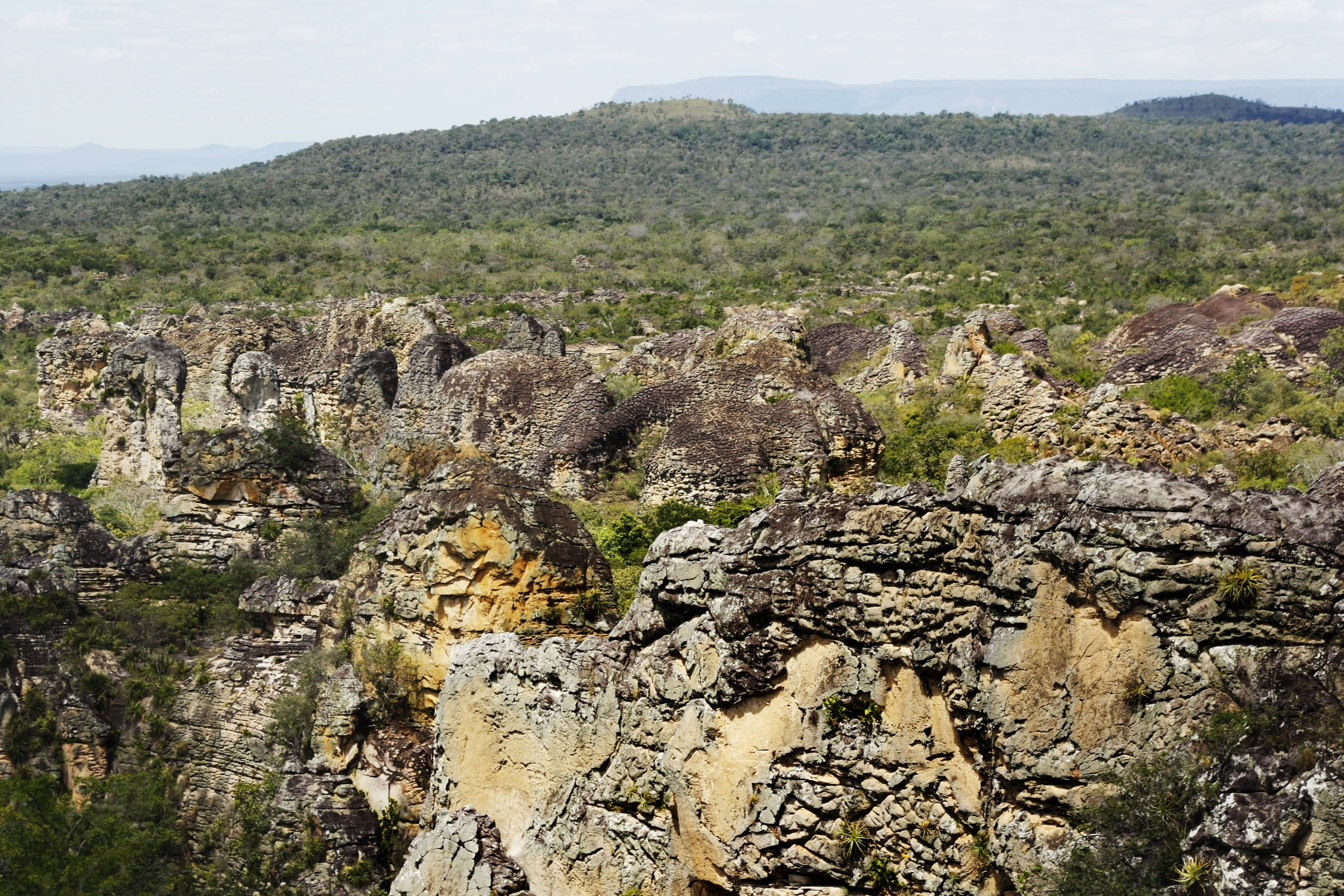

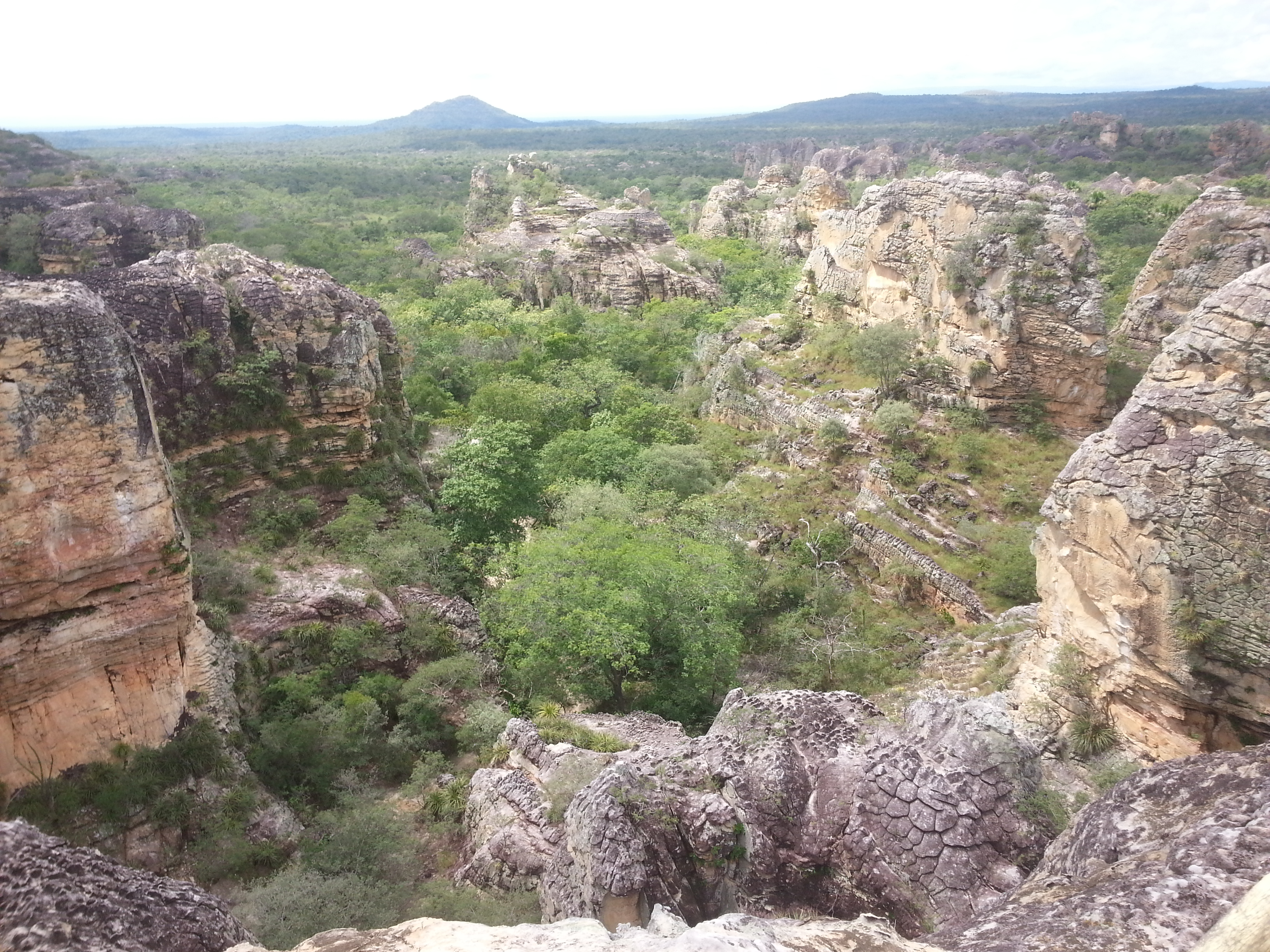

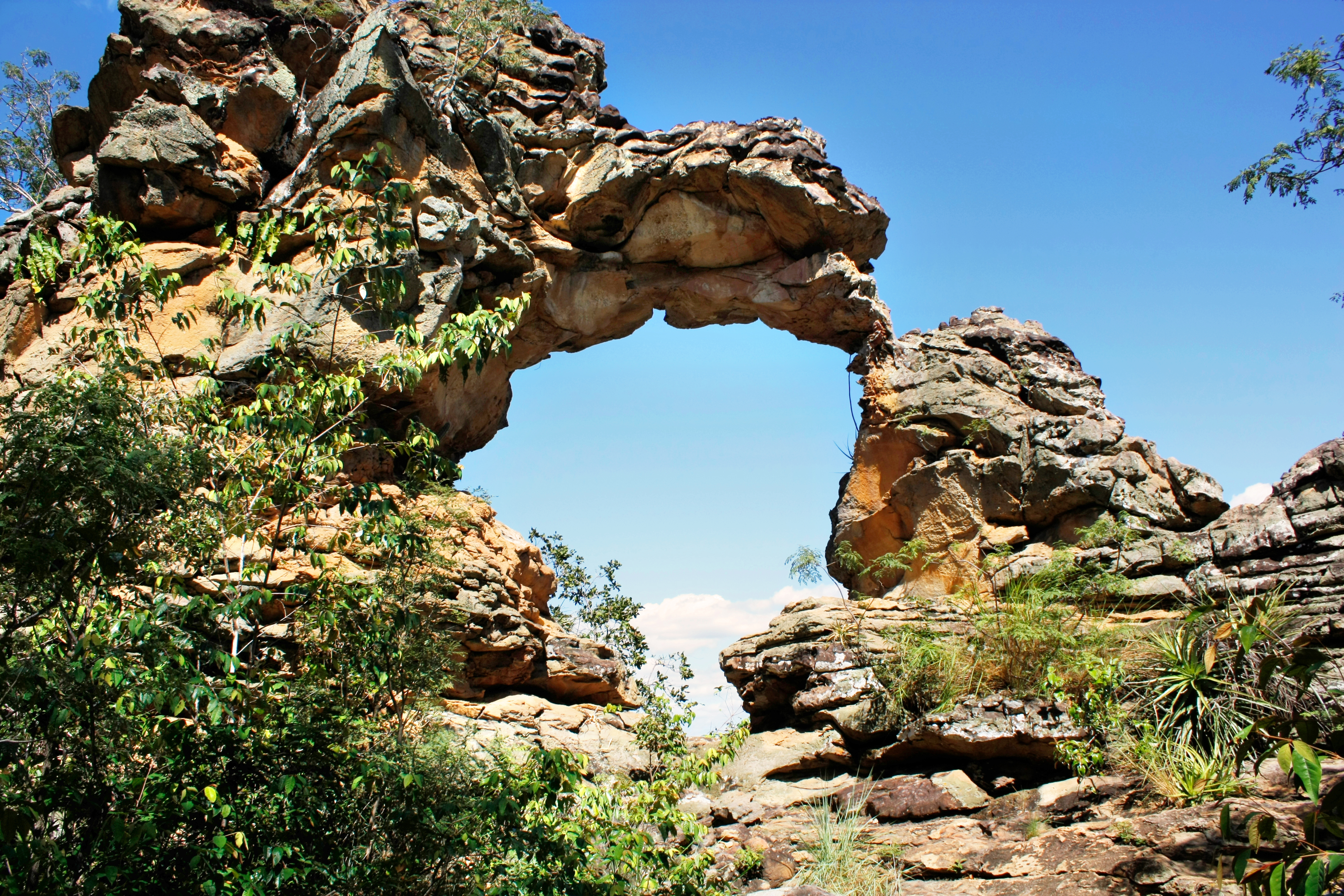

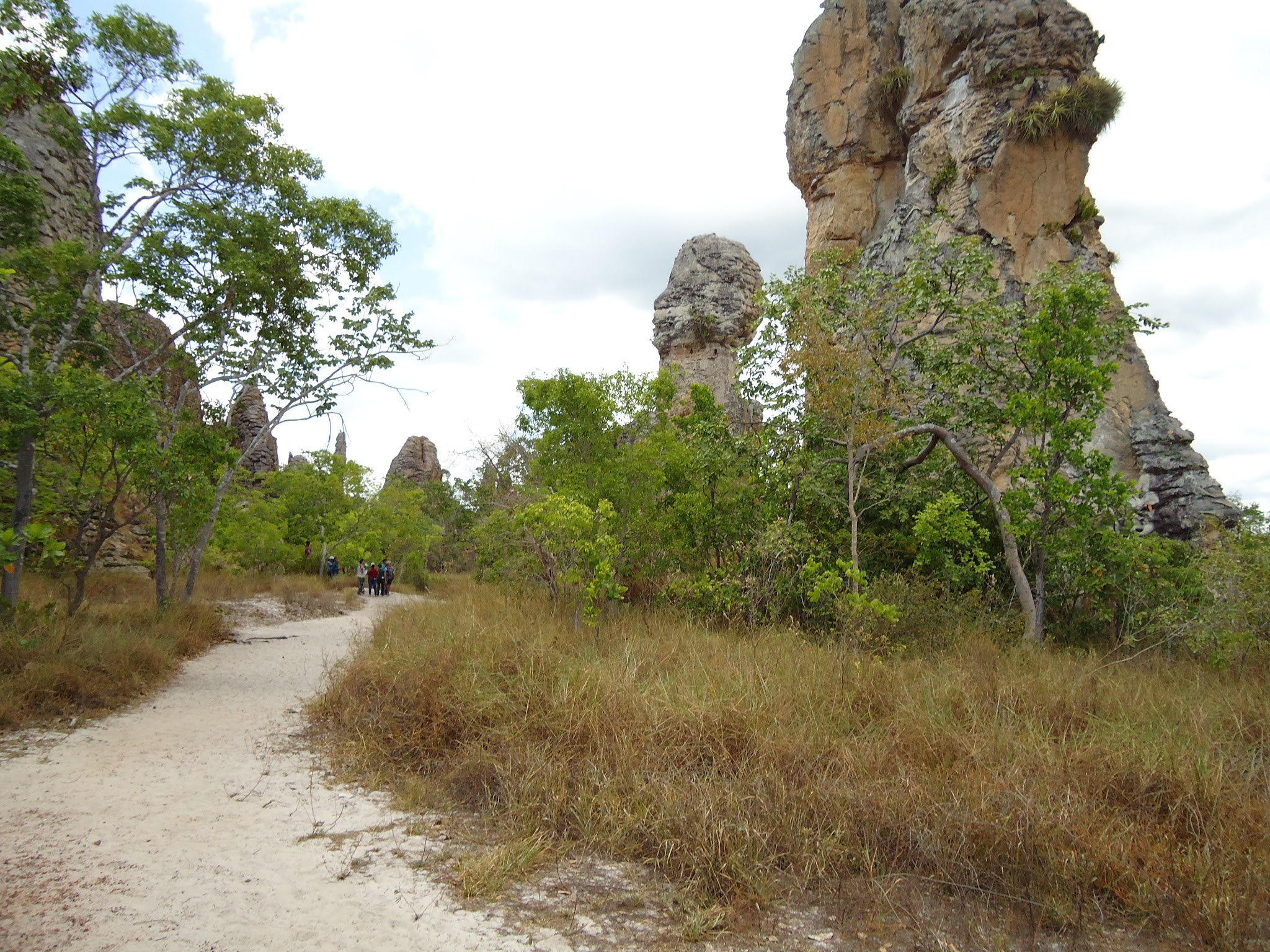

== Sources ==
- APA Serra da Ibiapaba (in Portuguese), ISA: Instituto Socioambiental
- PARNA de Sete Cidades (in Portuguese), ISA: Instituto Socioambiental
