= Moraújo =

Municipality in Ceará, Brazil

Coordinates: 3°25′S 40°41′W

- Municipality
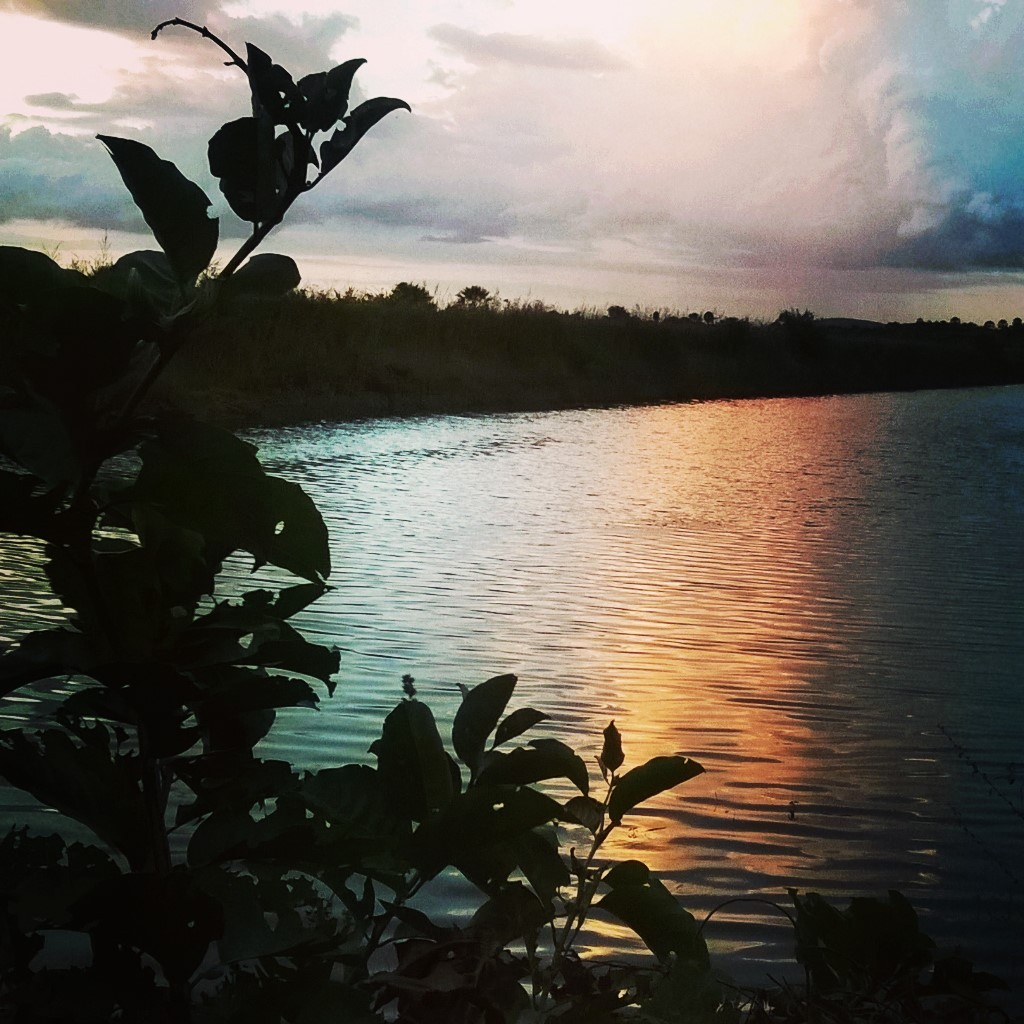

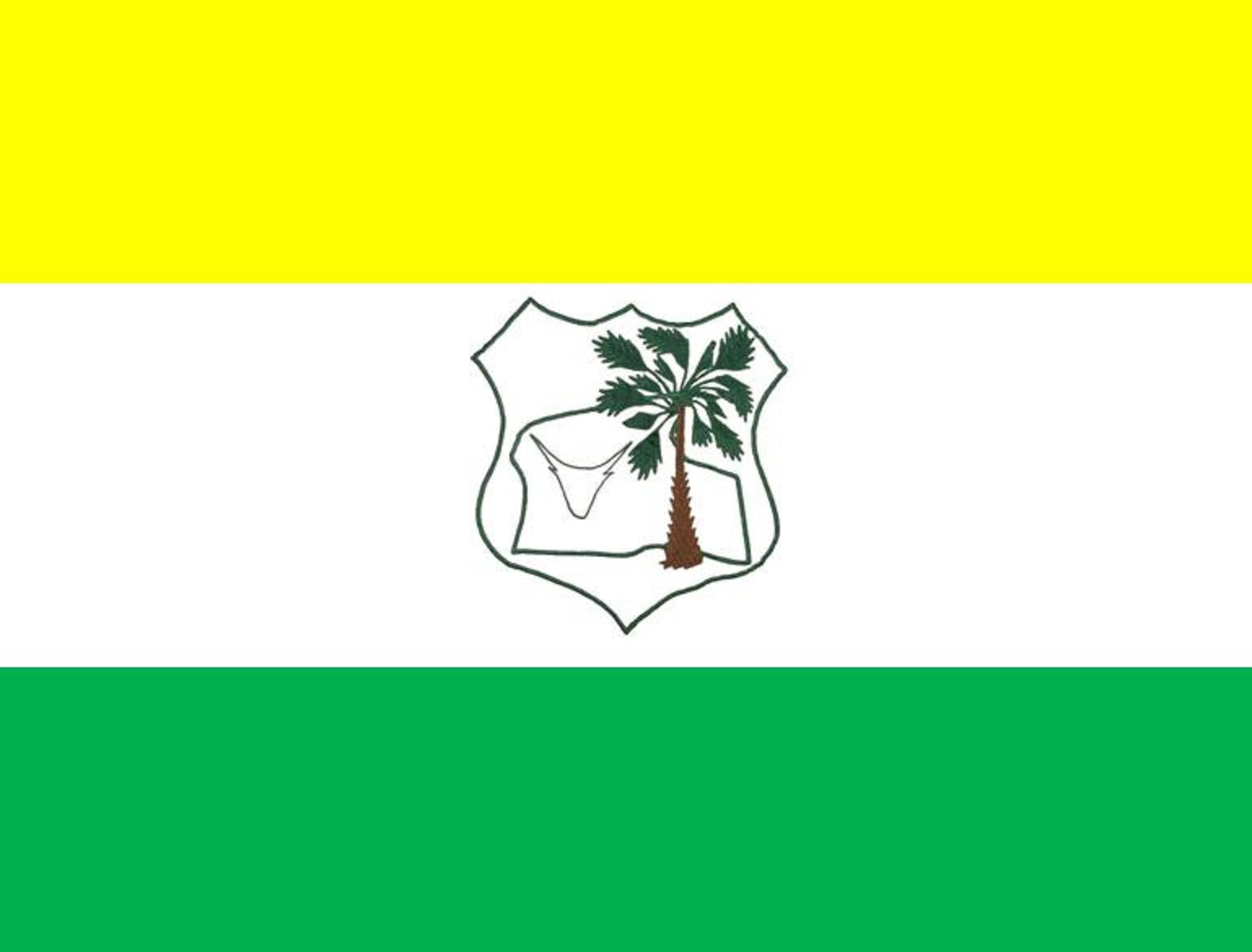
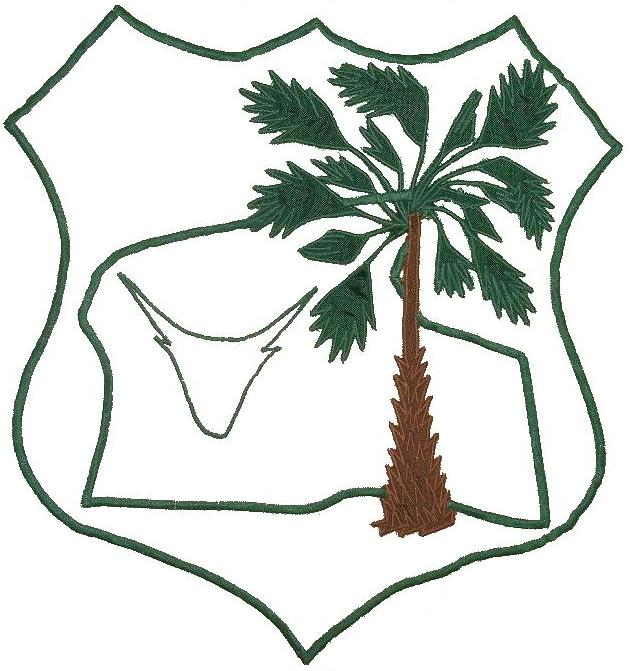
- Flag Coat of arms
- Interactive map of Moraújo
- Country: Brazil
- Region: Nordeste
- State: Ceará
- Mesoregion: Noroeste Cearense

Population (2020)
  - Total: 8,779
- Time zone: UTC−3 (BRT)

Moraújo is a municipality in the state of Ceará in the Northeast region of Brazil.

The municipality contains part of the 1,592,550 hectares (3,935,300 acres) Serra da Ibiapaba Environmental Protection Area, created in 1996.

== See also ==
- List of municipalities in Ceará
