= Piracuruca =

Coordinates: 3°56′S 41°42′W

- Municipality
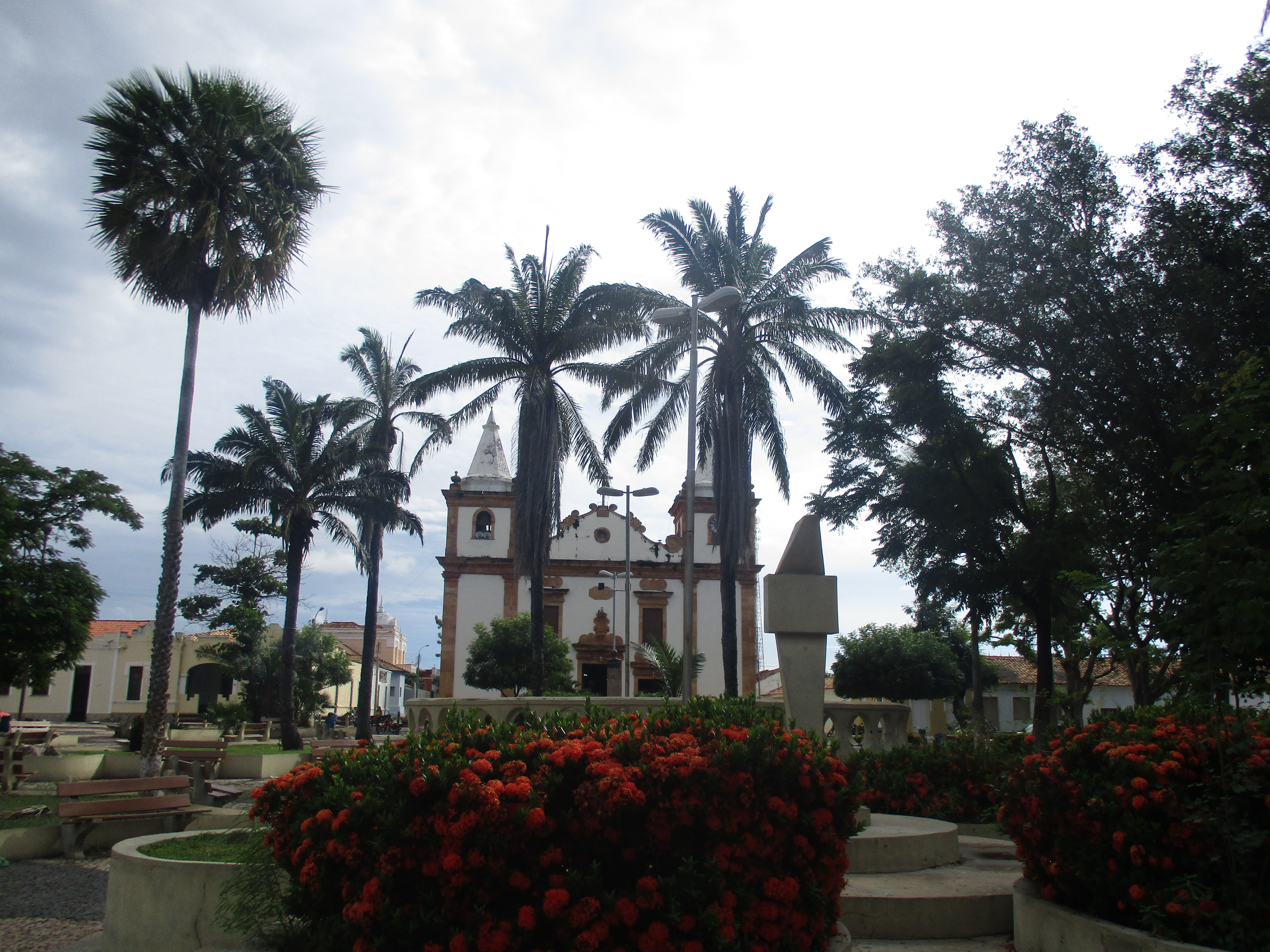

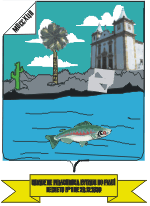
- Flag Coat of arms

- Location in Piauí
- Country: Brazil
- Region: Nordeste
- State: Piauí
- Mesoregion: Norte Piauiense

Population (2020)
  - Total: 28,874
- Time zone: UTC−3 (BRT)

Piracuruca is a municipality in the state of Piauí in the Northeast region of Brazil.

The municipality contains part of the 1,592,550-hectare (3,935,300-acre) Serra da Ibiapaba Environmental Protection Area, created in 1996. The municipality contains 74% of the 7,700-hectare (19,000-acre) Sete Cidades National Park, created in 1961.

== See also ==
- List of municipalities in Piauí
