= Serra da Ibiapaba Environmental Protection Area =

- Área de Proteção Ambiental Serra da Ibiapaba
- IUCN category V (protected landscape/seascape)
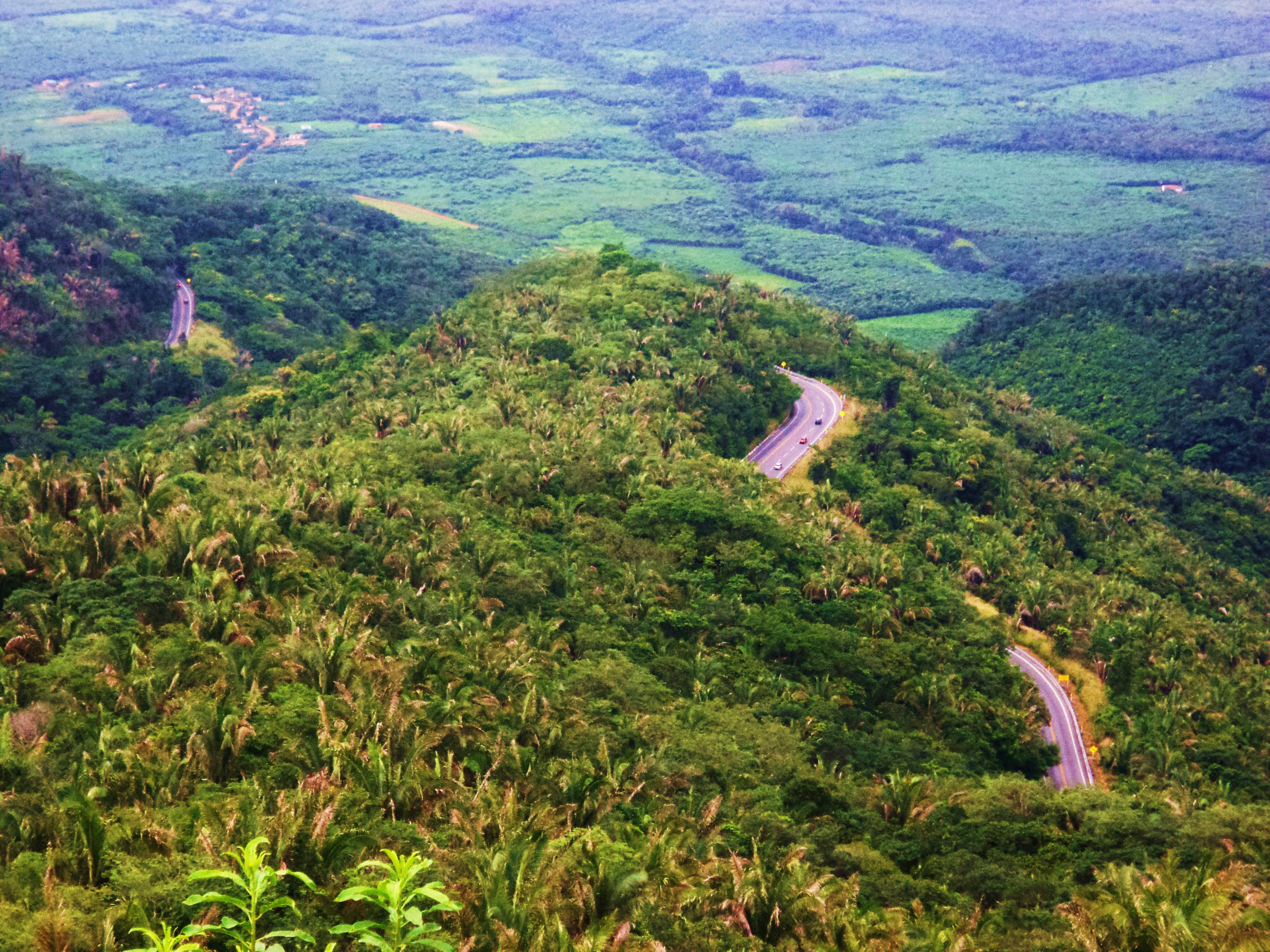
- BR-222 in the Serra da Ibiapaba

- Location within Brazil
- Nearest city: Piracuruca, Piauí
- Coordinates: 4°04′26″S 41°23′29″W
- Area: 1,592,550 ha (6,148.9 sq mi)
- Designation: Environmental protection area
- Created: 26 November 1996
- Administrator: ICMBio

The Serra da Ibiapaba Environmental Protection Area (Portuguese: Área de Proteção Ambiental Serra da Ibiapaba) is an environmental protection area in the states of Piauí and Ceará, Brazil. It contains fragments of cerrado, caatinga and Atlantic Forest, and is home to the endangered red-handed howler.

== Location ==
The Serra da Ibiapaba Environmental Protection Area (APA) covers parts of the states of Piauí and Ceará, with a total area of 1,592,550 hectares (3,935,300 acres). In Piauí it covers all or part of the municipalities of Bom Princípio do Piauí, Brasileira, Buriti dos Lopes, Cocal, Domingos Mourão, Lagoa de São Francisco, Pedro II, Piracuruca, Piripiri, Batalha, Buriti dos Montes, Caraúbas do Piauí, Caxingó, Cocal dos Alves, Juazeiro do Piauí, Luís Correia, Milton Brandão, São João da Fronteira, São José do Divino and Sigefredo Pacheco. In Ceará it covers all or part of the municipalities of Chaval, Granja, Moraújo, Tianguá, Viçosa do Ceará and Uruoca.

The APA is 340 kilometres (210 mi) from Fortaleza and 300 kilometres (190 mi) from Teresina. The APA adjoins the Delta do Parnaíba Environmental Protection Area to the north. It surrounds the Sete Cidades National Park, and adjoins the Ubajara National Park to the east.

== History ==
The Serra da Ibiapaba Environmental Protection Area was created by federal decree on 26 November 1996 in the bioregion of the Serra Grande complex with the objective of guaranteeing conservation of remnants of cerrado, caatinga and Atlantic Forest in a total area of about 1,592,550 hectares (3,935,300 acres). It aims to guarantee conservation of remnants of Cerrado and Caatinga in around the Sete Cidades National Park, and also the seasonal forest, open rainforest and transitional forests. The park is classed IUCN protected area category V (protected landscape / seascape.

The consultative council was created by ordinance 105 of 8 October 2012 to contribute to creation and implementation of the APA's management plan. This was an important step in implementing and managing the APA, and was followed by meetings and workshops with representatives of civil society and government entities. The APA is administered by the Chico Mendes Institute for Biodiversity Conservation (ICMBio).

== Environment ==
Via Rural places the APA in the caatinga biome and the ecotone between caatinga and Amazon rainforest. The APA contains remnants of cerrado and caatinga trees around the Sete Cidades National Park, and open and transitional seasonal rainforest in the mountains of the region. Endangered species that are protected in the APA include the red-handed howler (Alouatta belzebul) and the frog Adelophryne baturitensis.

Most of the population of the APA are rural families engaged in agriculture as their main economic activity. Threats include indiscriminate burning and deforestation, predatory hunting, illegal trade in wild animals, poor management of water resources, indiscriminate use of pesticides and misuse of the soil. The consultative council wants to promote ecotourism and handicrafts, and sustainable activities such as agroforestry, agroecology and beekeeping, and to replace large and medium-sized animals and poultry.

== Sources ==
- APA Serra da Ibiapaba (in Portuguese), ICMBio: Chico Mendes Institute for Biodiversity Conservation
- APA Serra da Ibiapaba (in Portuguese), ISA: Instituto Socioambiental
- APA Serra da Ibiapaba – Buscando alternativas econômicas sustentáveis (in Portuguese), WWF, 18 December 2013
- Área de Proteção Ambiental da Serra de Ibiapaba (in Portuguese), Via Rural, archived from the original on May 20, 2009
- Unidade de Conservação: Área de Proteção Ambiental Serra da Ibiapaba (in Portuguese), MMA: Ministério do Meio Ambiente
