= Uruoca =

Municipality in Ceará, Brazil

- Municipality
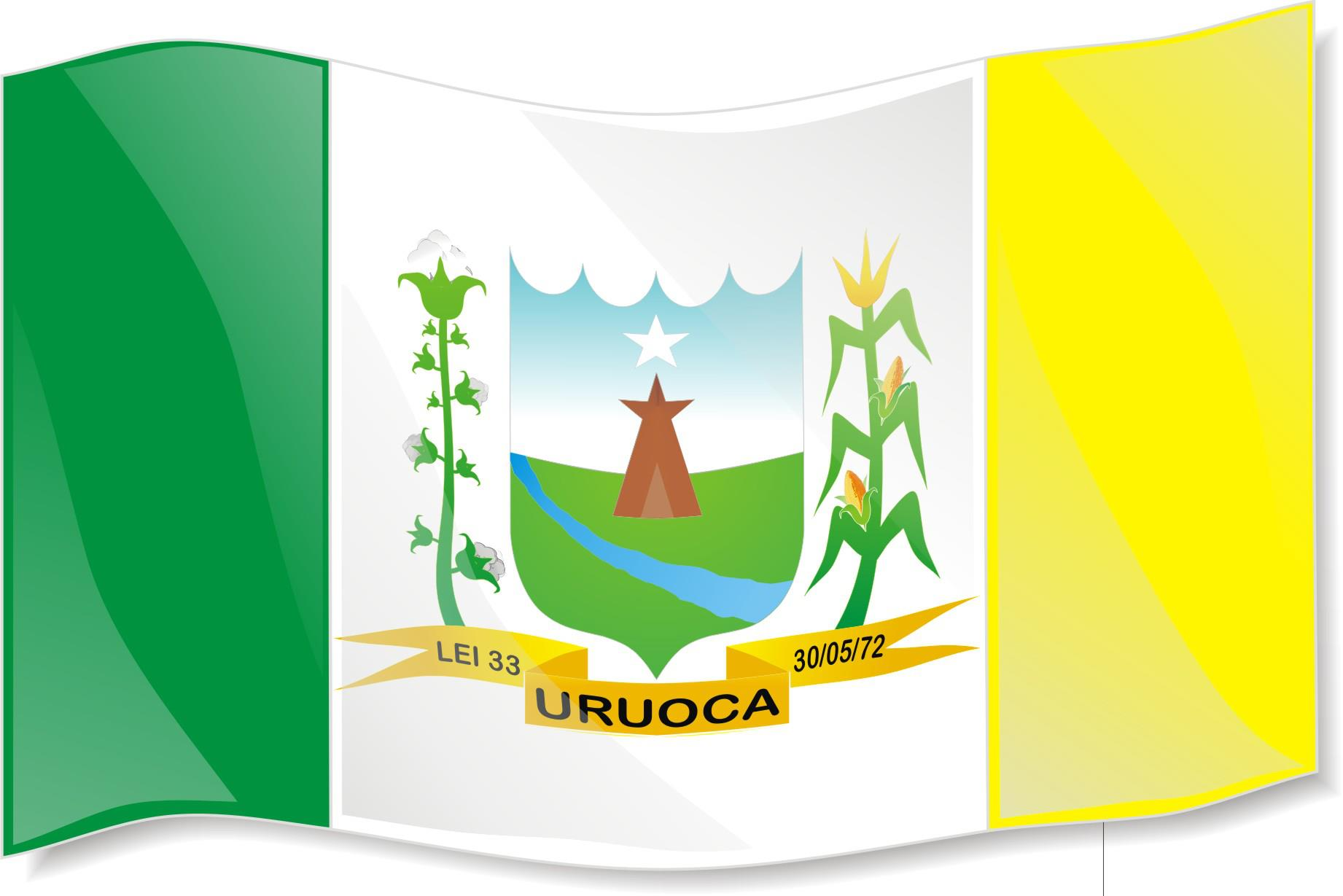
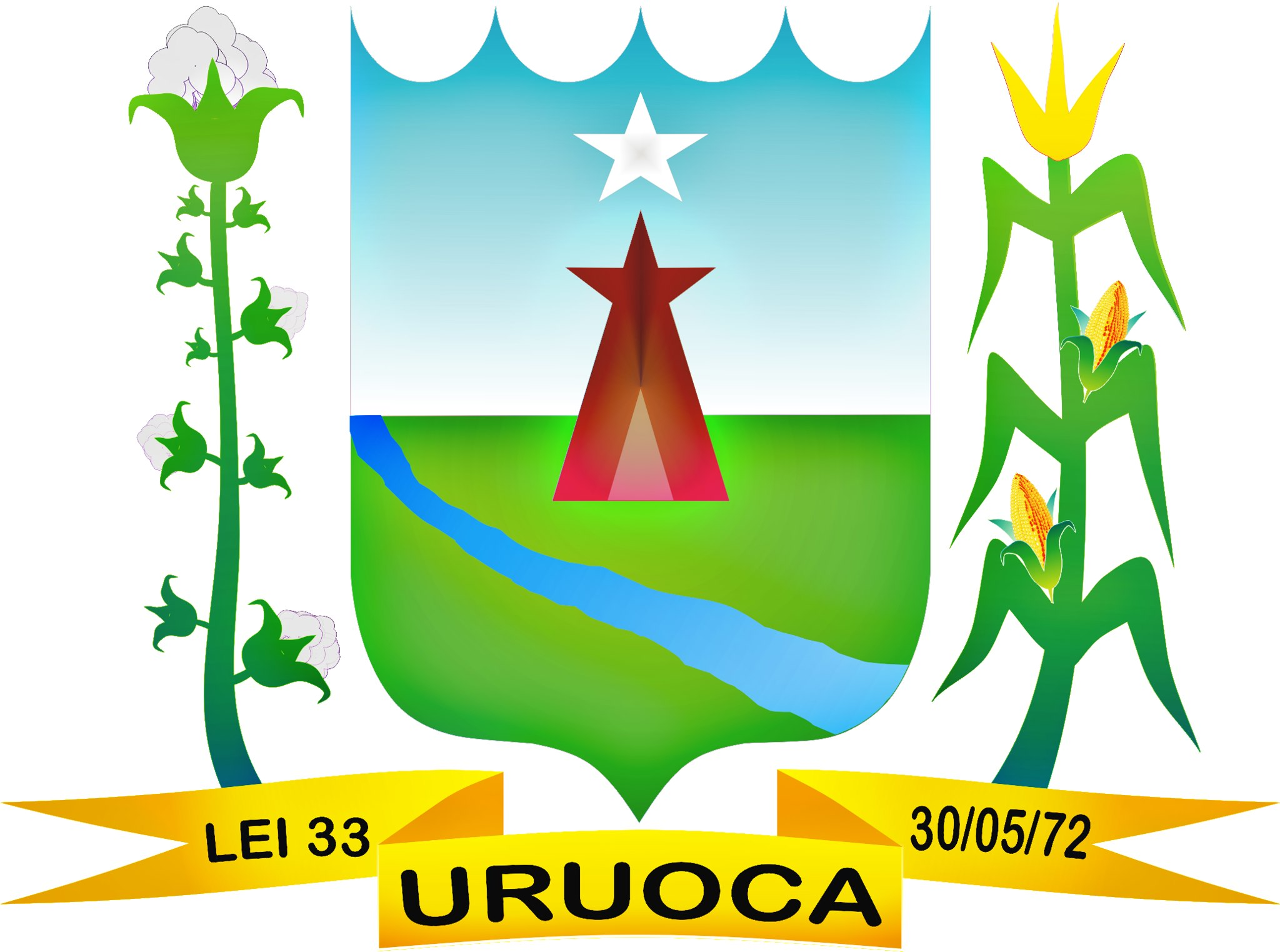
- Flag Coat of arms

- Location in Ceará state

- Location in Brazil
- Coordinates: 03°18′50″S 40°33′25″W
- Country: Brazil
- Region: Northeast
- State: Ceará

Population (2020)
  - Total: 13,915
- Time zone: UTC−3 (BRT)

Uruoca is a municipality of the Brazilian state of Ceará. Its estimated population is 13,915 inhabitants. It is part of the microregion of Coreaú, which is one of the seven microregions that make up the mesoregion of Noroeste Cearense.

The municipality contains part of the 1,592,550 hectares (3,935,300 acres) Serra da Ibiapaba Environmental Protection Area, created in 1996.
