= Caxingó =

Coordinates: 3.41778°S 41.8958°W

- Municipality
- Country: Brazil
- Region: Nordeste
- State: Piauí
- Mesoregion: Norte Piauiense

Population (2020)
  - Total: 5,451
- Time zone: UTC−3 (BRT)

Caxingó is a municipality in the state of Piauí in the Northeast region of Brazil.

The municipality contains part of the 1,592,550-hectare (3,935,300-acre) Serra da Ibiapaba Environmental Protection Area, created in 1996.

== Mystery cave paintings ==
Caxingo is the location of some mysterious images which show 13 vectors converging on a point. Curiously, the same image is also found in India at Bhopal.

== See also ==
- List of municipalities in Piauí
