= Brasileira, Piauí =

Coordinates: 4°7′51″S 41°46′55″W

Brasileira
- Municipality
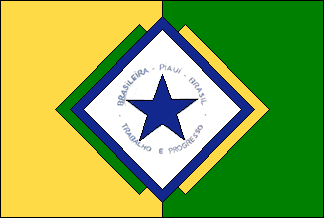
- Flag

- Location of Brasileira in Piauí
- Country: Brazil
- Region: Nordeste
- State: Piauí
- Mesoregion: Norte Piauiense

Population (2020)
  - Total: 8,347
- Time zone: UTC−3 (BRT)

Brasileira is a municipality in the state of Piauí in the Northeast region of Brazil.

The municipality contains part of the 1,592,550-hectare (3,935,300-acre) Serra da Ibiapaba Environmental Protection Area, created in 1996. It contains 26% of the 7,700-hectare (19,000-acre) Sete Cidades National Park, created in 1961.

== See also ==
- List of municipalities in Piauí
