= São José do Divino, Piauí =

Coordinates: 3.81083°S 41.8328°W

São José do Divino
- Municipality
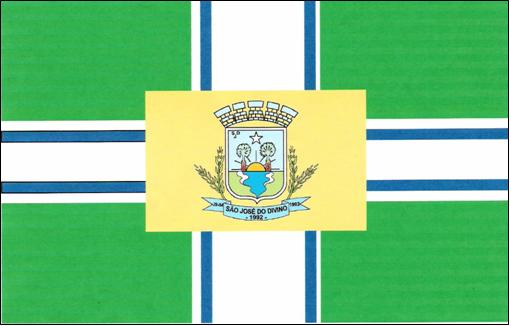
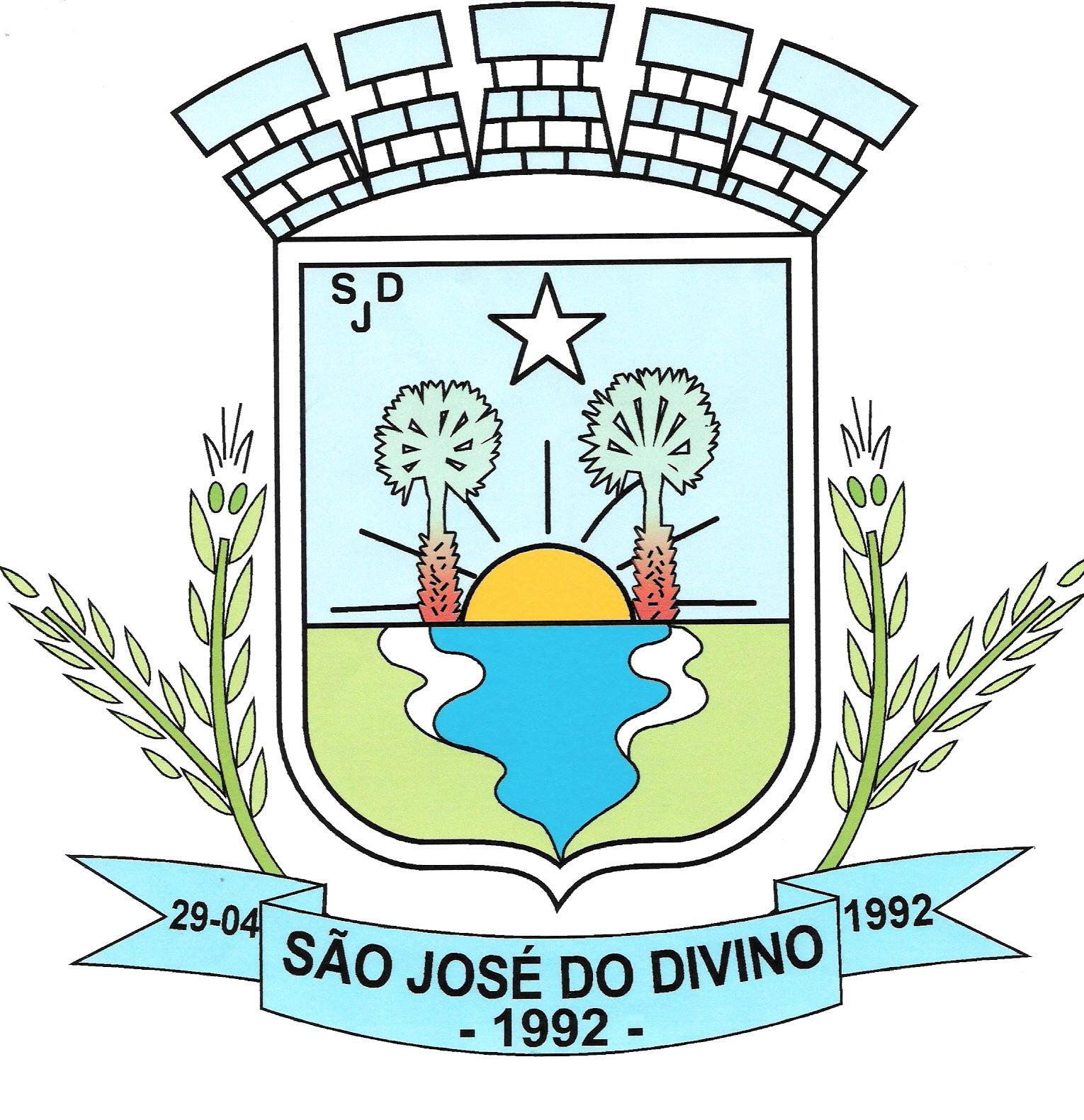
- Flag Coat of arms

- Country: Brazil
- Region: Nordeste
- State: Piauí
- Mesoregion: Norte Piauiense

Population (2020)
  - Total: 5,354
- Time zone: UTC−3 (BRT)

São José do Divino is a municipality in the state of Piauí in the Northeast region of Brazil.

The municipality contains part of the 1,592,550-hectare (3,935,300-acre) Serra da Ibiapaba Environmental Protection Area, created in 1996.

== See also ==
- List of municipalities in Piauí
