= São João da Fronteira =

- Municipality
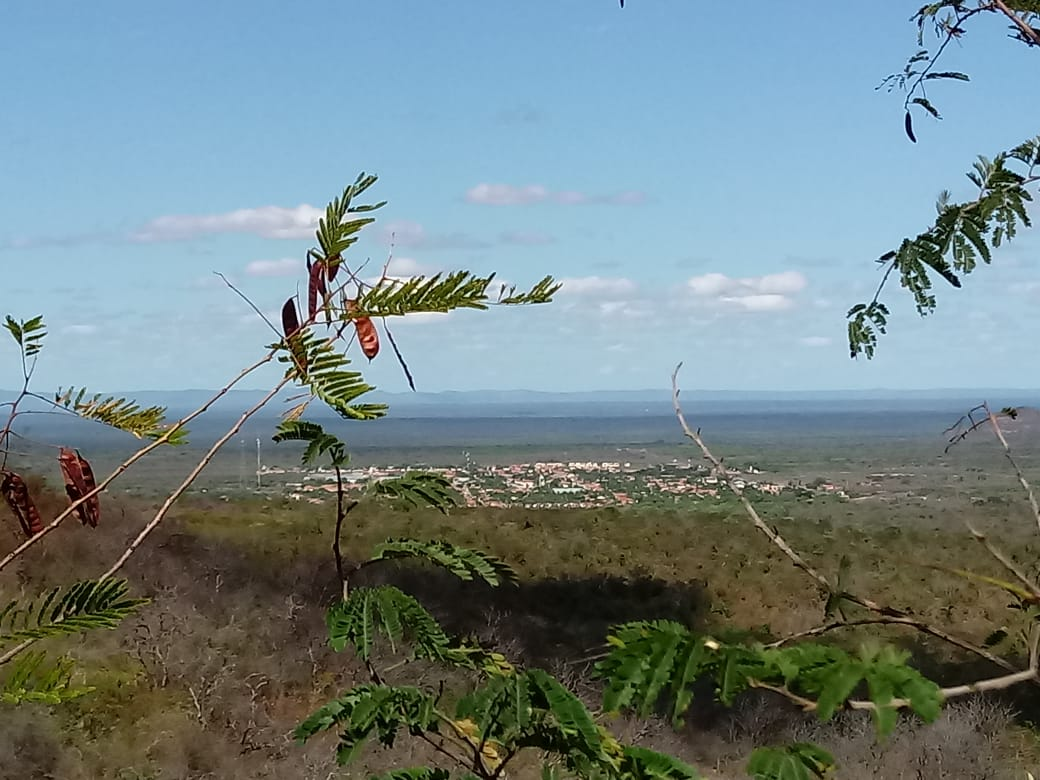

- Location in Piauí state

- Location in Brazil
- Coordinates: 3°57′20″S 41°15′27″W
- Country: Brazil
- Region: Northeast
- State: Piauí
- Microregion: Litoral Piauiense

Area
  - Total: 764.86 km^{2} (295.31 sq mi)

Population (2020)
  - Total: 6,064
  - Density: 7.928/km^{2} (20.53/sq mi)
- Time zone: UTC−3 (BRT)
- Website: www.stoantonioaventureiro.mg.gov.br

São João da Fronteira (Portuguese meaning "Saint John of the frontier") is a municipality in the western part of the state of Piauí in Brazil. The population is 6,064 (2020 est.) in an area of 764.86 km^{2} (295.31 sq mi). The elevation is 458 m.

The municipality contains part of the 1,592,550-hectare (3,935,300-acre) Serra da Ibiapaba Environmental Protection Area, created in 1996.
