= Batalha, Piauí =

Coordinates: 4°01′26″S 42°04′40″W

Batalha
- Municipality
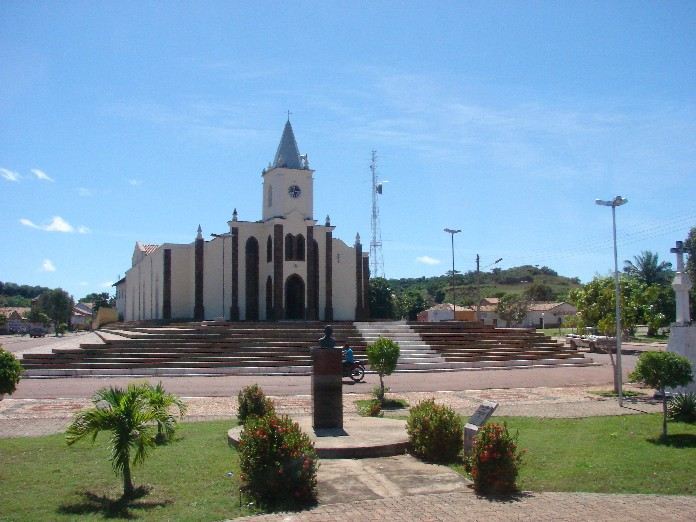

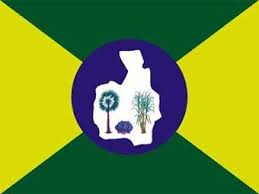
- Flag

- Country: Brazil
- Region: Nordeste
- State: Piauí
- Mesoregion: Norte Piauiense

Population (2020)
  - Total: 26,905
- Time zone: UTC−3 (BRT)

Batalha is a municipality in the state of Piauí in the Northeast region of Brazil.

The municipality contains part of the 1,592,550 hectares (3,935,300 acres) Serra da Ibiapaba Environmental Protection Area, created in 1996.

== See also ==
- List of municipalities in Piauí
